= Kirchweger =

Kirchweger is a German surname. Notable people with the surname include:

- Anton Josef Kirchweger (died 1746), editor/author
- Heinrich Kirchweger (1809–1899), German railway engineer
  - Kirchweger condenser, a device to preheat feedwater in a steam locomotive using the exhaust steam from the engine
- Ernst Kirchweger (1898–1965), Nazi concentration camp survivor and the first person to die as a result of political conflict in Austria's Second Republic
  - Ernst-Kirchweger-Haus, a building in Vienna's 10th district, Favoriten
