= Anschluss =

1938 annexation of Austria into Nazi Germany

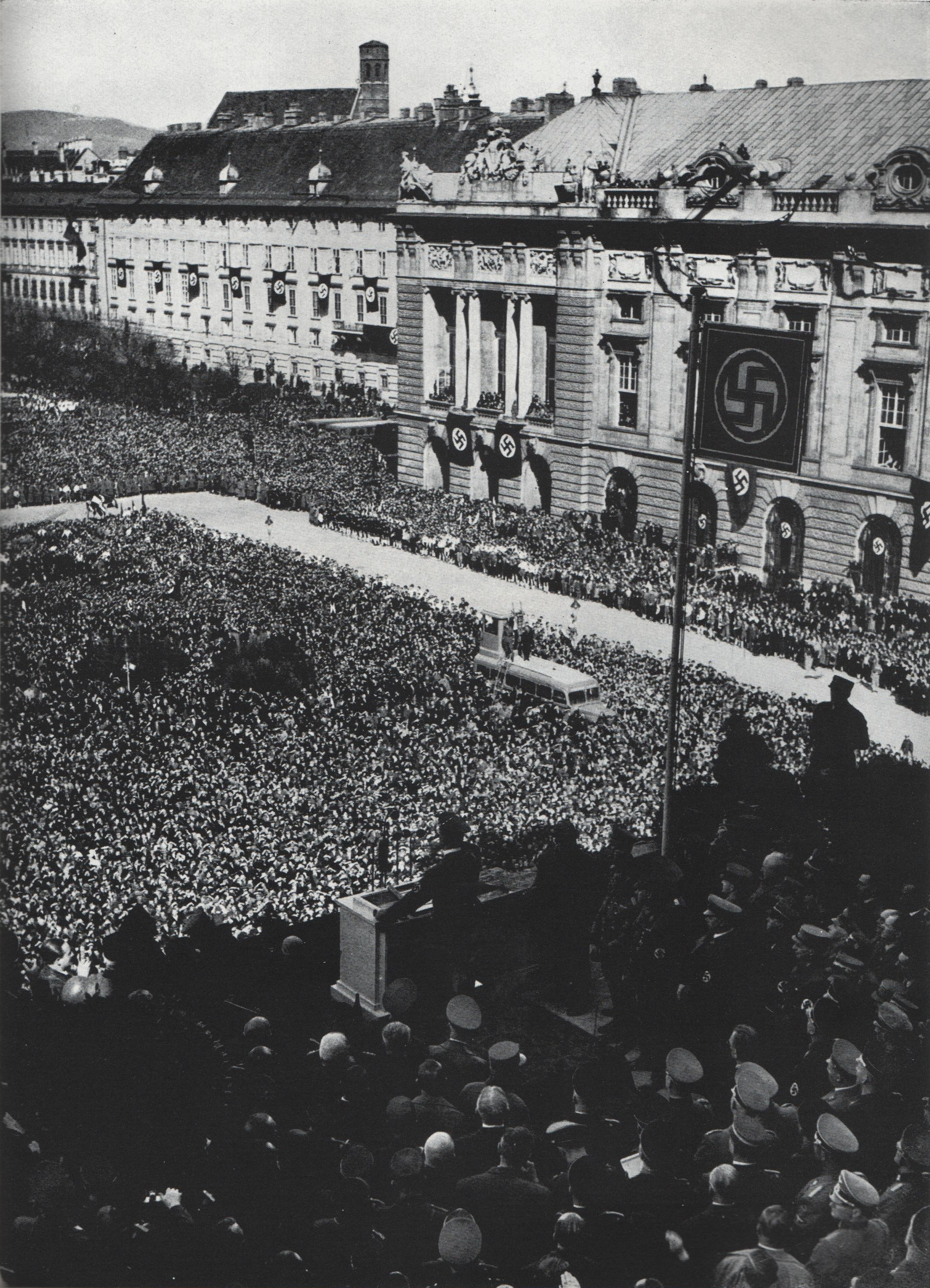
Austrian citizens gather on the Heldenplatz to hear Hitler's declaration of annexation.

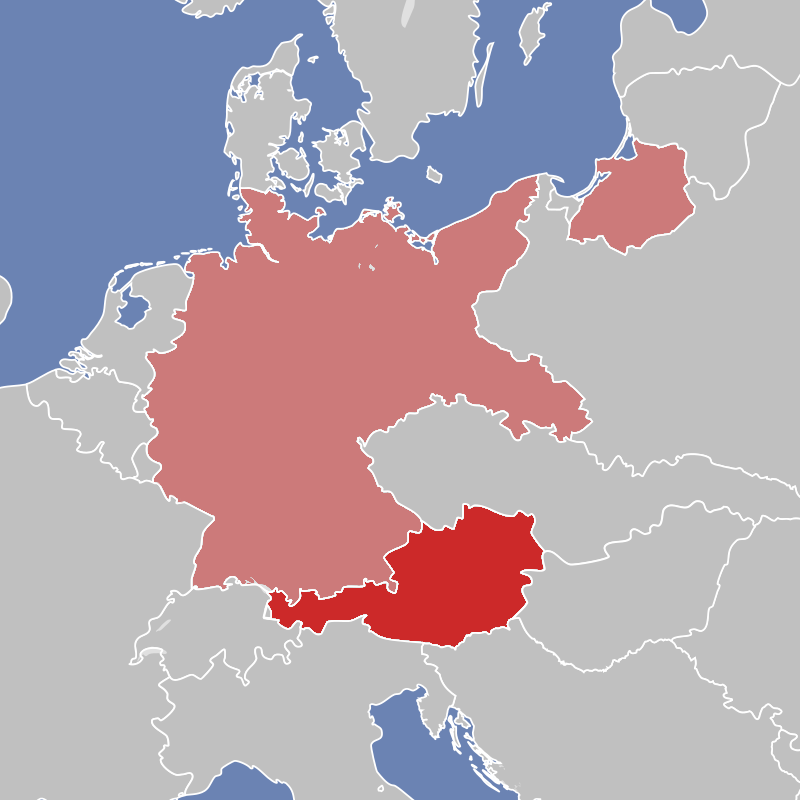
Territory of the German Reich and Austria before the Anschluss

The Anschluss (German: [ˈʔanʃlʊs], or Anschluß, (Note: before the German orthography reform of 1996) lit. 'joining' or 'connection'), also known as the Anschluß Österreichs (English: Annexation of Austria), was the annexation of the Federal State of Austria into Nazi Germany on 12 March 1938.

The idea of an Anschluss (a united Austria and Germany that would form a "Greater Germany") (Note: After the Prussian-dominated German nation-state was created in 1871 without Austria, the German question was still very active in most parts of the ethnic German lands of the Austro-Hungarian and German empires; the Austrian pan-Germans were in favour of a Pan-German vision of Austria joining Germany in order to create a "Greater Germany" and the Germans inside the German Empire were in favour of all Germans being unified into a single state.) arose after the 1871 unification of Germany excluded Austria and the German Austrians from the Prussian-dominated German Empire. It gained support after the Austro-Hungarian Empire fell in 1918. The new Republic of German-Austria attempted to form a union with Germany, but the 1919 Treaty of Saint Germain and Treaty of Versailles forbade both the union and the continued use of the name "German-Austria" (Deutschösterreich); they also stripped Austria of some of its territories, such as the Sudetenland. This left Austria without most of the territories it had ruled for centuries amidst an economic crisis.

By the 1920s, the Anschluss proposal had strong support in both Austria and Germany, particularly from many Austrian citizens of the political left and center. One vehement supporter was prominent Social Democrat leader Otto Bauer, who served as the Austrian foreign minister in 1918–1919. Support for unification with Germany came mainly from the belief that Austria, stripped of its imperial land, was not viable economically. Popular support for the unification faded with time, although it remained as a concept in the contemporary Austrian political discourse.

On 30 January 1933, Nazi Party leader Adolf Hitler was appointed chancellor of Germany. From then on, desire for unification could be identified with the Nazi regime, for whom it was an integral part of the Nazi "Heim ins Reich" ("back home to the realm") concept, which sought to incorporate as many Volksdeutsche (ethnic Germans outside Germany) as possible into a "Greater Germany". Nazi Germany's agents cultivated pro-unification tendencies in Austria, and sought to undermine the Austrian government, which was controlled by the Fatherland Front, which opposed unification. During an attempted coup in July 1934, Austrian chancellor Engelbert Dollfuss was assassinated by Austrian Nazis. The defeat of the coup prompted many leading Austrian Nazis to go into exile in Germany, where they continued their efforts to unify the two countries.

On 5 November 1937, Hitler informed his military aides that he would annex Austria and Czechoslovakia to the German Reich, and forced a meeting with Austrian chancellor Kurt Schuschnigg. Although Schuschnigg viewed Austria as a "German State", he fiercely opposed annexation into the Greater Germanic Reich. His commitment to Austrian sovereignty was pushed to the brink on February 12, 1938, during a tense meeting with Adolf Hitler at Berchtesgaden. Under the threat of military invasion, Schuschnigg accepted a devastating ultimatum: either appoint Arthur Seyss-Inquart, a prominent Austrian National Socialist, as Minister of the Interior and Security or face dire consequences. On the eve of 9 March 1938, Schuschnigg defiantly announced that there would be a referendum held on 13 March to decide between a possible union with Germany or the maintenance of Austria's sovereignty. Schuschnigg expected to win a clear majority to face the Nazi challenge, but on 11 March, Hitler, again under the threat of German occupation, issued a demand for cancellation of the referendum and Schuschnigg's immediate resignation. Bowing to pressure and unrest from both German and Austrian Nazi factions, Schuschnigg resigned, forcing Austrian president Wilhelm Miklas to reluctantly appoint Seyss-Inquart as Schuschnigg's successor. Within hours of taking office, Seyss-Inquart then "invited" Hitler and the German Army to cross the border to "restore order" in Austria on 12 March, unopposed by the Austrian military. A plebiscite was held on 10 April, resulting in 99.7% approval.

== Historical background ==
The German Confederation 1815–1866

=== Before 1918 ===
The idea of grouping all Germans into one nation-state had been the subject of debate in the 19th century from the dissolution of the Holy Roman Empire in 1806 until the break-up of the German Confederation in 1866. Austria had wanted a Großdeutsche Lösung (greater Germany solution), whereby the German states would unite under the leadership of the Austrian House of Habsburg. This solution would have included all the German states (including the non-German regions of Austria), but Prussia would have had to accept a secondary role. This controversy, called dualism, dominated Prusso-Austrian diplomacy and the politics of the German states in the mid-nineteenth century.

In 1866 the feud finally came to an end during the Austro-Prussian War in which the Prussians defeated the Austrians and thereby excluded the Austrian Empire and German Austrians from Germany. The Prussian statesman Otto von Bismarck formed the North German Confederation, which included most of the remaining German states, aside from a few in the southwestern region of the German-inhabited lands, and further expanded the power of the Kingdom of Prussia. Bismarck used the Franco-Prussian War (1870–1871) as a way to convince southwestern German states, including the Kingdom of Bavaria, to side with Prussia against the Second French Empire. Due to Prussia's quick victory, the debate was settled and in 1871 the "Kleindeutsch" German Empire based on the leadership of Bismarck and Prussia formed—this excluded Austria. Besides ensuring Prussian domination of a united Germany, the exclusion of Austria also ensured that Germany would have a substantial Protestant majority. The exclusion of the Austrian Germans and Austria from Germany prompted the Social Democratic Party of Austria’s leader Otto Bauer to state that the dilemma was "the conflict between our Austrian and German character.”

The Austro-Hungarian Compromise of 1867, the Ausgleich, provided for a dual sovereignty, the Austrian Empire and the Kingdom of Hungary, under Franz Joseph I. This diverse empire included various different ethnic groups including Hungarians, Slavic ethnic groups such as Bosniaks, Croats, Czechs, Poles, Rusyns, Serbs, Slovaks, Slovenes, and Ukrainians, as well as Italians and Romanians ruled by a German minority. The empire caused tensions between the various ethnic groups. Many Austrian pan-Germans showed loyalty to Otto von Bismarck and only to Germany, wore symbols that were temporarily banned in Austrian schools and advocated the dissolution of the empire to allow Austria to rejoin Germany, as it had been during the German Confederation of 1815–1866. Although many Austrians supported pan-Germanism, many others still showed allegiance to the Habsburg monarchy and wished for Austria to remain an independent country.

=== Aftermath of World War I ===
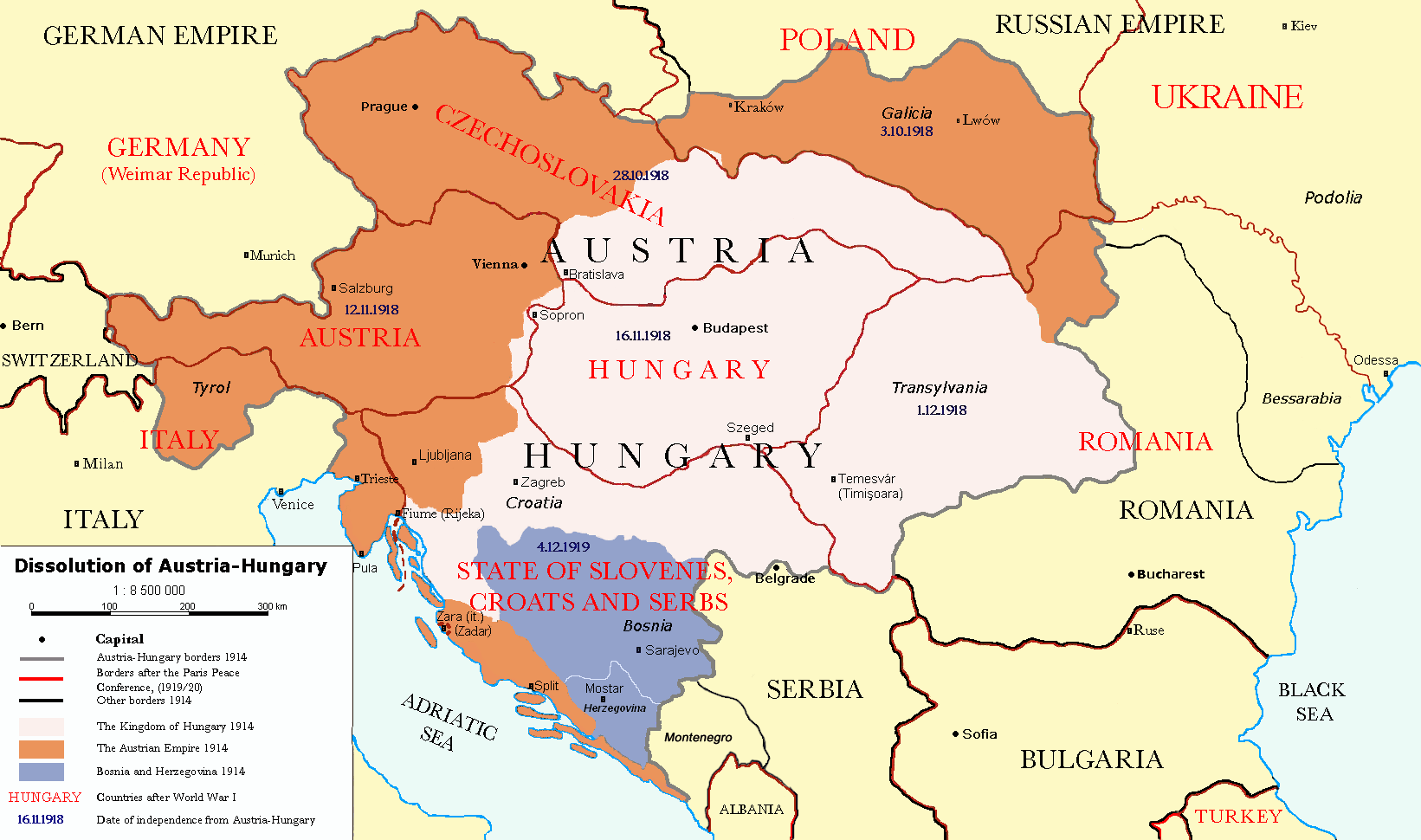
Map of the dissolution of Austria-Hungary in 1918

Erich Ludendorff wrote to the Federal Foreign Office on 14 October 1918 about the possibility of conducting an Anschluss with the German areas of Austria-Hungary as its dissolution removed the problem of the country's numerous ethnic groups. Secretary Wilhelm Solf opposed the proposal, stating that it "would provide the Entente with justification for demanding territorial compensations". During the Paris Peace Conference the French sought to forbid a union between Austria and Germany, with French Minister of Foreign Affairs Stephen Pichon stating that they "must see that Germany is not given an opportunity to rebuild her strength by utilizing the Austrian populations which remain outside of Czechoslovakia, Poland, and Jugoslavia". A compromise was reached and Article 80 of the Treaty of Versailles stated that "Germany acknowledges and will respect strictly the independence of Austria, within the frontiers which may be fixed in a Treaty between that State and the Principal Allied and Associated Powers; she agrees that this independence shall be inalienable, except with the consent of the Council of the League of Nations."

Elite and popular opinion in the rump Republic of German-Austria after 1918 largely favored some sort of union with Germany. An Austrian provisional national assembly drafted a provisional constitution that stated that "German Austria is a democratic republic" (Article 1) and "German Austria is a component of the German Republic" (Article 2). Later plebiscites in the Austrian border provinces of Tyrol and Salzburg yielded majorities of 98% and 99% in favor of a unification with the Weimar Republic. Further plebiscites were then forbidden. However, Erich Bielka noted that the plebiscites were marred by electoral fraud and voter manipulation, and therefore did not reflect what the general Austrian opinion was at that time:

In addition to the massive propaganda campaign and not insignificant Reich German influence, 'Ja' ballot papers were pre-printed and provided at the polling stations and ballots were to be handed to an election official, undermining voter confidentiality. In addition, voter eligibility rules were liberally conceived and, therefore, open to abuse. Not only were those registered for the Nationalrat elections of October 1920 permitted to vote, but also those who registered themselves as living in Tyrol before April 1921, that is, less than a fortnight before going to the polls, as were all those Tyroleans who lived outside of the state; a train was even chartered from Bavaria to mitigate the financial burden of travelling 'home'.

In the aftermath of a prohibition of an Anschluss, Germans in both Austria and Germany pointed to a contradiction in the national self-determination principle because the treaties failed to grant self-determination to the ethnic Germans (such as German Austrians and Sudeten Germans) outside of the German Reich. Hugo Preuss, the drafter of the German Weimar Constitution, criticized efforts to prevent an Anschluss; he saw the prohibition as a contradiction of the Wilsonian principle of self-determination of peoples.

The constitutions of the Weimar Republic and the First Austrian Republic both included the political goal of unification, which parties widely supported. In the early 1930s, the Austrian government looked to a possible customs union with the German Republic in 1931. However, ultimately regional patriotism was stronger than pan-German sentiment. In the Austrian Empire, each Kronland had its own functional government and enjoyed a fair amount of autonomy from Vienna, with "each looking to their own capital" instead. According to Jody Manning, the idea of unification with Germany was not overwhelmingly popular among the Austrian population in 1919, which is one of the reasons why no nationwide referendum was held, even before it was forbidden by the Entente:

Despite the initially compelling statistics, overall, it appears doubtful that a qualified majority of Austrians would have supported Anschluss with Germany. From the sparse evidence available, it appears that the pro-Anschluss movement could only hope for a slim majority in the event of a plebiscite, and not the 75 per cent necessary, and that the number of Anschluss supporters in 1919 was not more than 50 per cent of the population. Even Otto Bauer, leader of the Social Democratic party, had to admit that both the bourgeoisie and the peasantry wanted 'an independent Austria fully capable of a national life of its own'. Also telling is Bauer's admission that, because of the strength of the conservative opposition to Anschluss and the real possibility that the majority would have voted against the Anschluss, the Socialists did not dare to hold a referendum in 1919.

Poincarés third government attempted to prevent an Anschluss by incorporating Austria into a Danubian Confederation in 1927. German Minister of Foreign Affairs Gustav Stresemann opposed it, as he saw it as an attempt to re-form the Austro-Hungarian Empire and offered to form a customs union with Austria. Austrian Chancellor Ignaz Seipel, an Anschluss opponent, rejected the offer. In September 1929, Seipel was replaced by Johannes Schober, who pursued a pro-Germany policy and attempted to form a customs union. A political and economical crisis led to Schober losing power (30 September 1930) and Seipel returning to the government as Minister of Foreign Affairs. Negotiations were restarted after Otto Ender became chancellor and were finalized with German Foreign Affairs Minister Julius Curtius on 5 March 1931, before being approved by Germany on 18 March. France opposed the customs union, stating that it was in violation of Article 88 of the Treaty of Saint-Germain-en-Laye.

=== Nazi Germany, Fascist Italy, and Austria ===
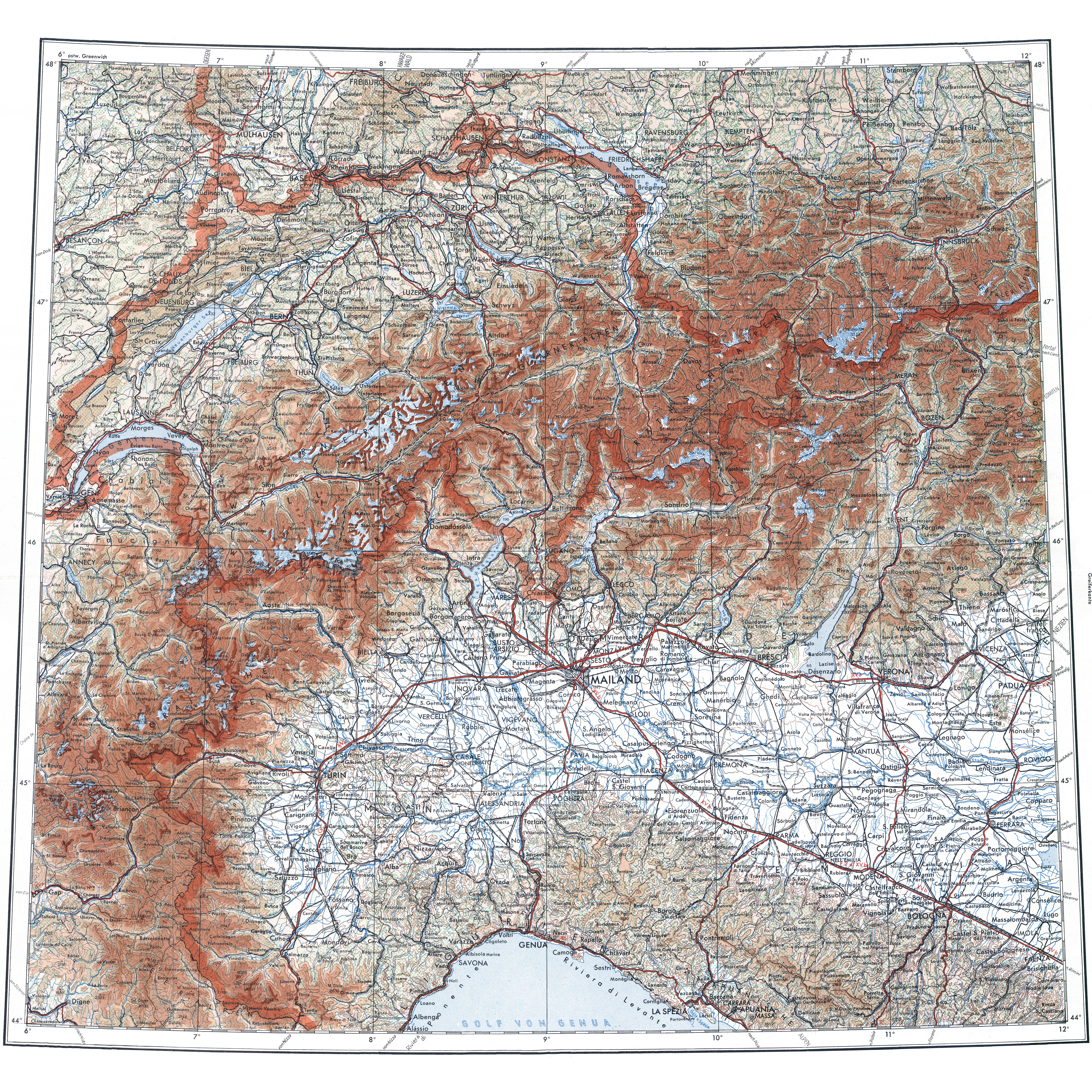
German military map during the Second World War, with no border between Germany and Austria (top right; also showing Alsace as part of Germany because it was directly incorporated into the Reich)

When the Nazis, led by Adolf Hitler, rose to power in the Weimar Republic, the Austrian government withdrew from economic ties. Like Germany, Austria experienced the economic turbulence which was a result of the Great Depression, with a high unemployment rate, and unstable commerce and industry. During the 1920s it was a target for German investment capital. By 1937, rapid German rearmament increased Berlin's interest in annexing Austria, rich in raw materials and labour. It supplied Germany with magnesium and the products of the iron, textile and machine industries. It had gold and foreign currency reserves, many unemployed skilled workers, hundreds of idle factories, and large potential hydroelectric resources.

Hitler, an Austrian German by birth, (Note: Hitler was an ethnic German, but was not a German citizen by birth since he had been born in the Austro-Hungarian empire. He gave up his Austrian citizenship in 1925 and remained stateless for seven years before he became a German citizen in 1932.) picked up his German nationalist ideas at a young age. On 12 September 1919, whilst observing a meeting at the Sterneckerbräu of the German Workers' Party (DAP) as a political/intelligence agent for the Reichswehr, Hitler became involved in a heated political argument with a visitor, a Professor Baumann, who proposed that Bavaria should break away from Prussia and found a new South German nation with Austria. In vigorously and adroitly attacking the man's arguments Hitler made an impression on the other party members with his aptitude for oratory and, according to Hitler, the "professor" left the hall acknowledging unequivocal defeat. Impressed with Hitler, Anton Drexler, then Chairman of the DAP, invited him to join the party. Hitler accepted on 12 September 1919, becoming the party's 55th member. After becoming leader of the DAP, Hitler addressed a crowd on 24 February 1920, and in an effort to appeal to wider parts of the German population, the DAP was renamed the National Socialist German Workers' Party (NSDAP).

As its first point, the 1920 National Socialist Program stated, "We demand the unification of all Germans in the Greater Germany on the basis of the people's right to self-determination. Hitler argued in a 1921 essay that the German Reich had a single task of, "incorporating the ten million German-Austrians in the Empire and dethroning the Habsburgs, the most miserable dynasty ever ruling." The Nazis aimed to re-unite all Germans who were either born in the Reich or living outside it in order to create an "all-German Reich". Hitler wrote in Mein Kampf (1925) that he would create a union between his birth country Austria and Germany by any means possible.

The First Austrian Republic was dominated from the late 1920s by the Christian Social Party (CS), whose economic policies were based on the papal encyclical Rerum novarum. The First Republic gradually disintegrated in 1933, when parliament was dissolved and power was centralized in the office of the chancellor, who was empowered to rule by decree. Rival parties, including the Austrian National Socialists, were banned, and government evolved into a corporatist, one-party government that combined the CS and the paramilitary Heimwehr. It controlled labor relations and the press. (See Fatherland Front). The new regime emphasized the Catholic elements of Austria's national identity and staunchly opposed union with Nazi Germany.

Engelbert Dollfuss and his successor, Kurt Schuschnigg, turned to Benito Mussolini's Italy for inspiration and support. Mussolini supported the independence of Austria, largely due to his concern that Hitler would eventually press for the return of Italian territories which had once been ruled by Austria. The pro-Austrian policy of Italy was such that it was sometimes compared that while a century before (pre-unification) Italy was Austria's puppet, now rump state Austria was Italy's, and Mussolini mobilised Italian troops sent to the Brenner Pass after the attempted coup that included the murder of Dollfuss in 1934. Afterwards Italy had formed a common front with Great Britain and France opposed to German rearmament in early 1935 in the context of German withdrawal from the International Disarmament Conference, the Stresa Front.

However, the Stresa Front collapsed after French foreign ministry signed a pact with the USSR in early 1935, and Britain reacted by signing a naval agreement with Germany. As such, when the Stresa Pact ministers’ (Samuel Hoare for Great Britain and Pierre Laval for France) attempt to appease Italy with part of Ethiopia after Mussolini's invasion in October 1935 was leaked to an indignant press and thereby retracted, Mussolini now needed support elsewhere in Ethiopia (see Second Italo-Abyssinian War), and from Germany he had it readily. After receiving Hitler's personal assurance that Germany would not seek territorial concessions from Italy, Mussolini entered into a relationship with Berlin that began with the formation of the Berlin–Rome Axis in 1936 which was formalised into a military alliance in the Pact of Steel in 1939. By 1938 there was little Italian dismay at the annexation of Austria given her preoccupation in the Spanish Civil War and relative reconciliation with Germany, especially with pro-German foreign minister Count Galeazzo Ciano in office, whose appointment in 1936 is cited as the “death-knell for independent Austria”.

=== Austrian Civil War to Anschluss ===
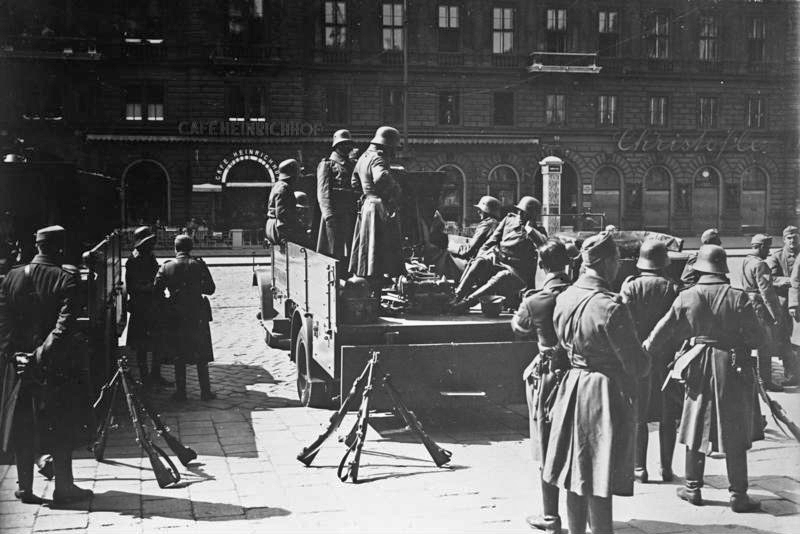
Soldiers of the Austrian Federal Army in Vienna, 12 February 1934

The Austrian Nazi Party failed to win any seats in the November 1930 general election, but its popularity grew in Austria after Hitler came to power in Germany. The idea of the country joining Germany also grew in popularity, thanks in part to a Nazi propaganda campaign which used slogans such as Ein Volk, ein Reich, ein Führer ("One People, One Empire, One Leader") to try to convince Austrians to advocate for an Anschluss to the German Reich. Anschluss might have occurred by democratic process had Austrian Nazis not begun a terrorism campaign. According to John Gunther in 1936, "In 1932 Austria was probably eighty percent pro-Anschluss".

When Germany permitted residents of Austria to vote on 5 March 1933, three special trains, boats and trucks brought such masses to Passau that the SS staged a ceremonial welcome. Gunther wrote that by the end of 1933 Austrian public opinion about German annexation was at least 60% against. On 25 July 1934, chancellor Dollfuss was assassinated by Austrian Nazis in a failed coup. Afterwards, leading Austrian Nazis fled to Germany but they continued to push for unification from there. The remaining Austrian Nazis continued terrorist attacks against Austrian governmental institutions, which caused 164 deaths and 636 injuries between 1933 and 1938.

Dollfuss's successor was Kurt Schuschnigg, who followed a political course similar to his predecessor. In 1935 Schuschnigg used the police to suppress Nazi supporters. Police actions under Schuschnigg included gathering Nazis (and Social Democrats) and holding them in internment camps. Austria between 1934 and 1938 focused on the history of Austria and opposed the absorption of Austria into Nazi Germany (according to the philosophy Austrians were "superior Germans"). Schuschnigg called Austria the "better German state" but struggled to keep Austria independent.

In an attempt to put Schuschnigg's mind at rest, Hitler delivered a speech at the Reichstag and said, "Germany neither intends nor wishes to interfere in the internal affairs of Austria, to annex Austria or to conclude an Anschluss."

In summer 1936, Schuschnigg told Mussolini that his country had to come to an agreement with Germany. On 11 July 1936 he signed an agreement with German ambassador Franz von Papen, in which Schuschnigg agreed to the release of Nazis imprisoned in Austria and Germany promised to respect Austrian sovereignty. Under the terms of the Austro-German treaty, Austria declared itself a "German state" that would always follow Germany's lead in foreign policy, and members of the "National Opposition" were allowed to enter the cabinet, in exchange for which the Austrian Nazis promised to cease their terrorist attacks against the government. This did not satisfy Hitler and the pro-German Austrian Nazis grew in strength.

In September 1936, Hitler launched the Four Year Plan that called for a dramatic increase in military spending and to make Germany as autarkic as possible with the aim of having the Reich ready to fight a world war by 1940. The Four Year Plan required huge investments in the Reichswerke steel works, a programme for developing synthetic oil that soon went wildly over budget, and programmes for producing more chemicals and aluminium; the plan called for a policy of substituting imports and rationalizing industry to achieve its goals that failed completely. As the Four Year Plan fell further and further behind its targets, Hermann Göring, the chief of the Four Year Plan office, began to press for an Anschluss as a way of securing Austria's iron and other raw materials as a solution to the problems with the Four Year Plan. The British historian Ian Kershaw wrote:

[A]bove all, it was Hermann Göring, at this time close to the pinnacle of his power, who far more than Hitler, throughout 1937 made the running and pushed the hardest for an early and radical solution to the 'Austrian Question'. Göring was not simply operating as Hitler's agent in matters relating to the 'Austrian Question'. His approach differed in emphasis in significant respects...But Göring's broad notions of foreign policy, which he pushed to a great extent on his own initiative in the mid-1930s drew more on traditional pan-German concepts of nationalist power-politics to attain hegemony in Europe than on the racial dogmatism central to Hitler's ideology.

Göring was far more interested in the return of the former German colonies in Africa than Hitler was, believing up to 1939 in the possibility of an Anglo-German alliance (an idea that Hitler had abandoned by late 1937), and wanted all Eastern Europe in the German economic sphere of influence. Göring did not share Hitler's interest in Lebensraum ("living space") as for him, merely having Eastern Europe in the German economic sphere of influence was sufficient. In this context, having Austria annexed to Germany was the key towards bringing Eastern Europe into Göring's desired Grossraumwirtschaft ("greater economic space").

Faced with problems in the Four Year Plan, Göring had become the loudest voice in Germany, calling for an Anschluss, even at the risk of losing an alliance with Italy. In April 1937, in a secret speech before a group of German industrialists, Göring stated that the only solution to the problems with meeting the steel production targets laid out by the Four Year Plan was to annex Austria, which Göring noted was rich in iron. Göring did not give a date for the Anschluss, but given that Four Year Plan's targets all had to be met by September 1940, and the current problems with meeting the steel production targets, suggested that he wanted an Anschluss in the very near-future.

== End of an independent Austria ==
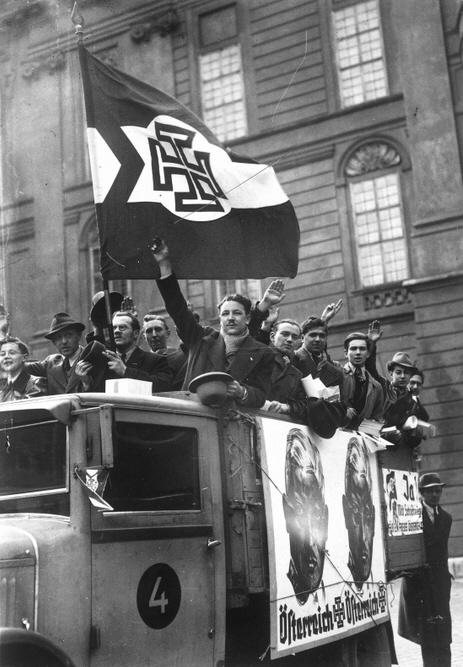
Supporters of Schuschnigg campaigning for the independence of Austria in March 1938, shortly before the Anschluss

Hitler told Goebbels in the late summer of 1937 that eventually Austria would have to be taken "by force". On 5 November 1937, Hitler called a meeting with the Foreign Minister Konstantin von Neurath, the War Minister Field Marshal Werner von Blomberg, the Army commander General Werner von Fritsch, the Kriegsmarine commander Admiral Erich Raeder and the Luftwaffe commander Hermann Göring recorded in the Hossbach Memorandum. At the conference, Hitler stated that economic problems were causing Germany to fall behind in the arms race with Britain and France, and that the only solution was to launch in the near-future a series of wars to seize Austria and Czechoslovakia, whose economies would be plundered to give Germany the lead in the arms race. In early 1938, Hitler was seriously considering replacing Papen as ambassador to Austria with either Colonel Hermann Kriebel, the German consul in Shanghai, or Albert Forster, the Gauleiter of Danzig. Significantly, neither Kriebel nor Forster was a professional diplomat, with Kriebel being one of the leaders of the 1923 Munich Beerhall putsch who had been appointed consul in Shanghai to facilitate his work as an arms dealer in China, while Forster was a Gauleiter who had proven he could get along with the Poles in his position in the Free City of Danzig; both men were Nazis who had shown some diplomatic skill. On 25 January 1938, the Austrian police raided the Vienna headquarters of the Austrian Nazi Party, arresting Gauleiter Leopold Tavs, the deputy to Captain Josef Leopold, discovered a cache of arms and plans for a putsch.

Following increasing violence and demands from Hitler that Austria agree to a union, Schuschnigg met Hitler at Berchtesgaden on 12 February 1938, in an attempt to avoid the takeover of Austria. Hitler presented Schuschnigg with a set of demands including appointing Nazi sympathizers to positions of power in the government. The key appointment was that of Arthur Seyss-Inquart as Minister of Public Security, with full, unlimited control of the police. In return Hitler would publicly reaffirm the treaty of 11 July 1936 and reaffirm his support for Austria's national sovereignty. Browbeaten and threatened by Hitler, Schuschnigg agreed to these demands and put them into effect.

Seyss-Inquart was a long-time supporter of the Nazis who sought the union of all Germans in one state. Leopold argues he was a moderate who favoured an evolutionary approach to union. He opposed the violent tactics of the Austrian Nazis, cooperated with Catholic groups, and wanted to preserve a measure of Austrian identity within Nazi Germany.

On 20 February, Hitler made a speech before the Reichstag which was broadcast live and which for the first time was relayed also by the Austrian radio network. A key phrase in the speech which was aimed at the Germans living in Austria and Czechoslovakia was: "The German Reich is no longer willing to tolerate the suppression of ten million Germans across its borders."

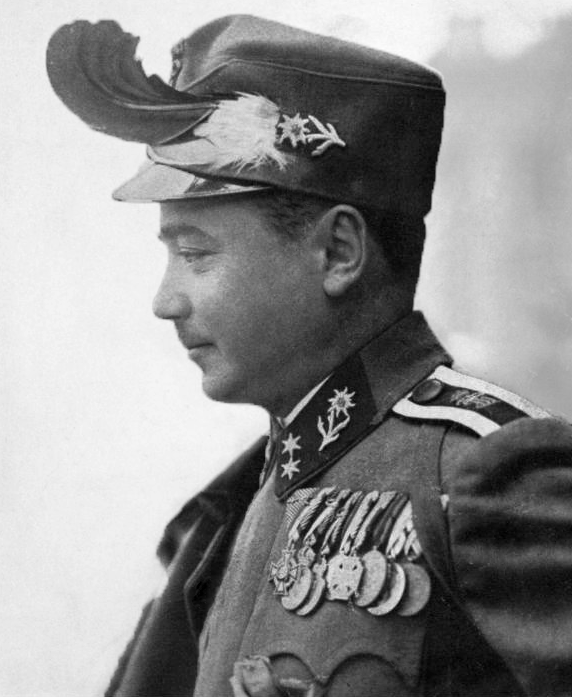
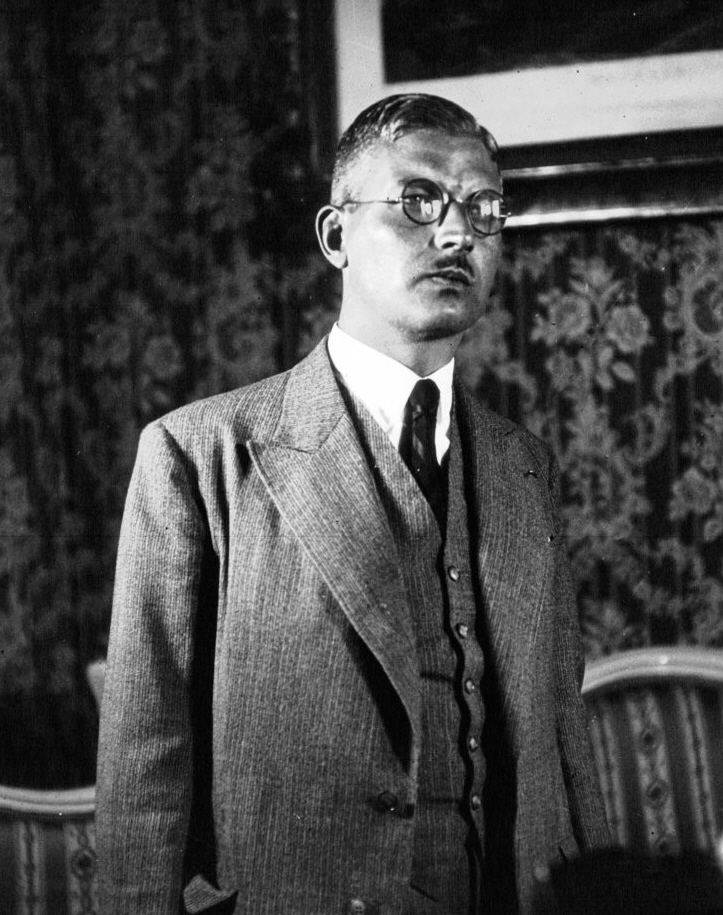
The Dollfuss/Schuschnigg regime fought to keep Austria as an independent country.

=== Schuschnigg announces a referendum ===
On 3 March 1938, Austrian Socialists offered to back Schuschnigg's government in exchange for political concessions, such as legalising socialist press, returning confiscated funds and "the lifting of the ban on the wearing of Social Democrat badges, show Social Democrat flags and standards and singing Social Democrat songs." Schuschnigg agreed to these demands and was supported by the united front of socialists and communists, as well as the Heimwehr, monarchist groups and the majority of the Austrian police. The Social Democrats also declared their readiness to support Schuschnigg in the event of a plebiscite under the conditions that immediately after such a plebiscite a definite negotiation be begun to include them in the Government. This support led Schuschnigg to announce the referendum. According to Peter R. Knaur, Germany believed that a defeat in a referendum was likely, and thus dispatched men to Vienna to prevent or modify the plebiscite. Knaur wrote: "The Nazis supposedly admitted that they only had the following of twenty percent, of the potential votes of the country."

On 9 March 1938, in the face of rioting by the small, but virulent, Austrian Nazi Party and ever-expanding German demands on Austria, Chancellor Kurt Schuschnigg called a referendum (plebiscite) on the issue, to be held on 13 March. Infuriated, on 11 March, Adolf Hitler threatened invasion of Austria, and demanded Chancellor von Schuschnigg's resignation and the appointment of the Nazi Arthur Seyss-Inquart as his replacement. Hitler's plan was for Seyss-Inquart to call immediately for German troops to rush to Austria's aid, restoring order and giving the invasion an air of legitimacy. In the face of this threat, Schuschnigg informed Seyss-Inquart that the plebiscite would be cancelled.

To secure a large majority in the referendum, Schuschnigg dismantled the one-party state. He agreed to legalize the Social Democrats and their trade unions in return for their support in the referendum. He also set the minimum voting age at 24 to exclude younger voters because the Nazi movement was most popular among the young. In contrast, Hitler had lowered the voting age for German elections held under Nazi rule, largely to compensate for the removal of Jews and other ethnic minorities from the German electorate following enactment of the Nuremberg Laws in 1935.

The plan went awry when it became apparent that Hitler would not stand by while Austria declared its independence by public vote. Hitler declared that the referendum would be subject to major fraud and that Germany would never accept it. In addition, the German ministry of propaganda issued press reports that riots had broken out in Austria and that large parts of the Austrian population were calling for German troops to restore order. Schuschnigg immediately responded that reports of riots were false.

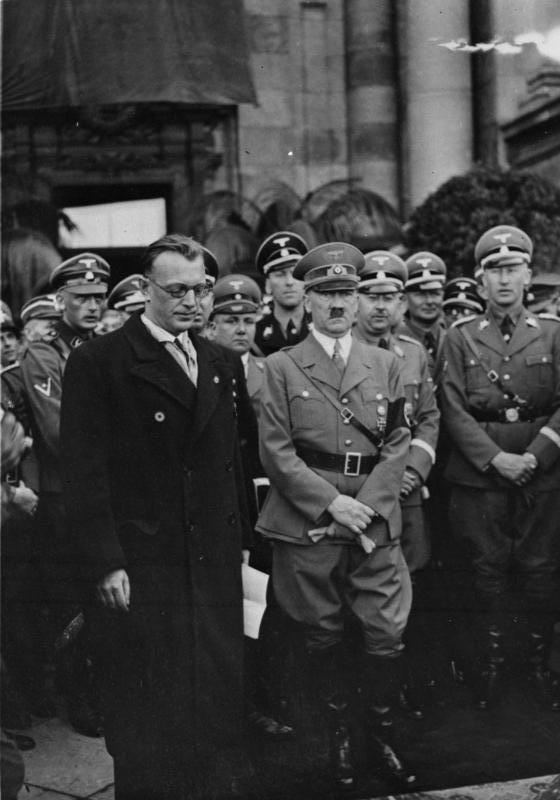
Seyss-Inquart and Hitler with Himmler and Heydrich to the right in Vienna, March 1938

Hitler sent an ultimatum to Schuschnigg on 11 March, demanding that he hand over all power to the Austrian Nazis or face an invasion. The ultimatum was set to expire at noon, but was extended by two hours. Without waiting for an answer, Hitler had already signed the order to send troops into Austria at one o'clock. Nevertheless, the German Führer underestimated his opposition.

As journalist Edgar Ansel Mowrer, reporting from Paris for CBS News, observed: "There is no one in all France who does not believe that Hitler invaded Austria not to hold a genuine plebiscite, but to prevent the plebiscite planned by Schuschnigg from demonstrating to the entire world just how little hold National Socialism really had on that tiny country."

Schuschnigg desperately sought support for Austrian independence in the hours following the ultimatum. Realizing that neither France nor Britain was willing to offer assistance, Schuschnigg resigned on the evening of 11 March, but President Wilhelm Miklas refused to appoint Seyss-Inquart as Chancellor. At 8:45 pm, Hitler, tired of waiting, ordered the invasion to commence at dawn on 12 March regardless. Around 10 pm, a forged telegram was sent in Seyss-Inquart's name asking for German troops, since he was not yet Chancellor and was unable to do so himself. Seyss-Inquart was not installed as Chancellor until after midnight, when Miklas resigned himself to the inevitable. In the radio broadcast in which Schuschnigg announced his resignation, he argued that he accepted the changes and allowed the Nazis to take over the government "to avoid the shedding of fraternal blood [Bruderblut]". Seyss-Inquart was appointed chancellor after midnight on 12 March.

It is said that after listening to Bruckner's Seventh Symphony, Hitler cried: "How can anyone say that Austria is not German! Is there anything more German than our old pure Austrianness?"

=== German troops march into Austria ===
Clip from UFA newsreel "German Entry into Austria"

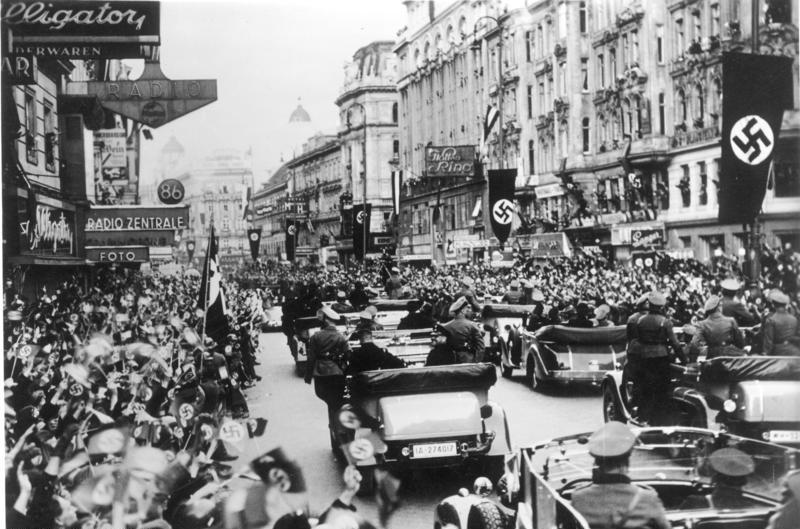
Cheering crowds greet the Nazis in Vienna.

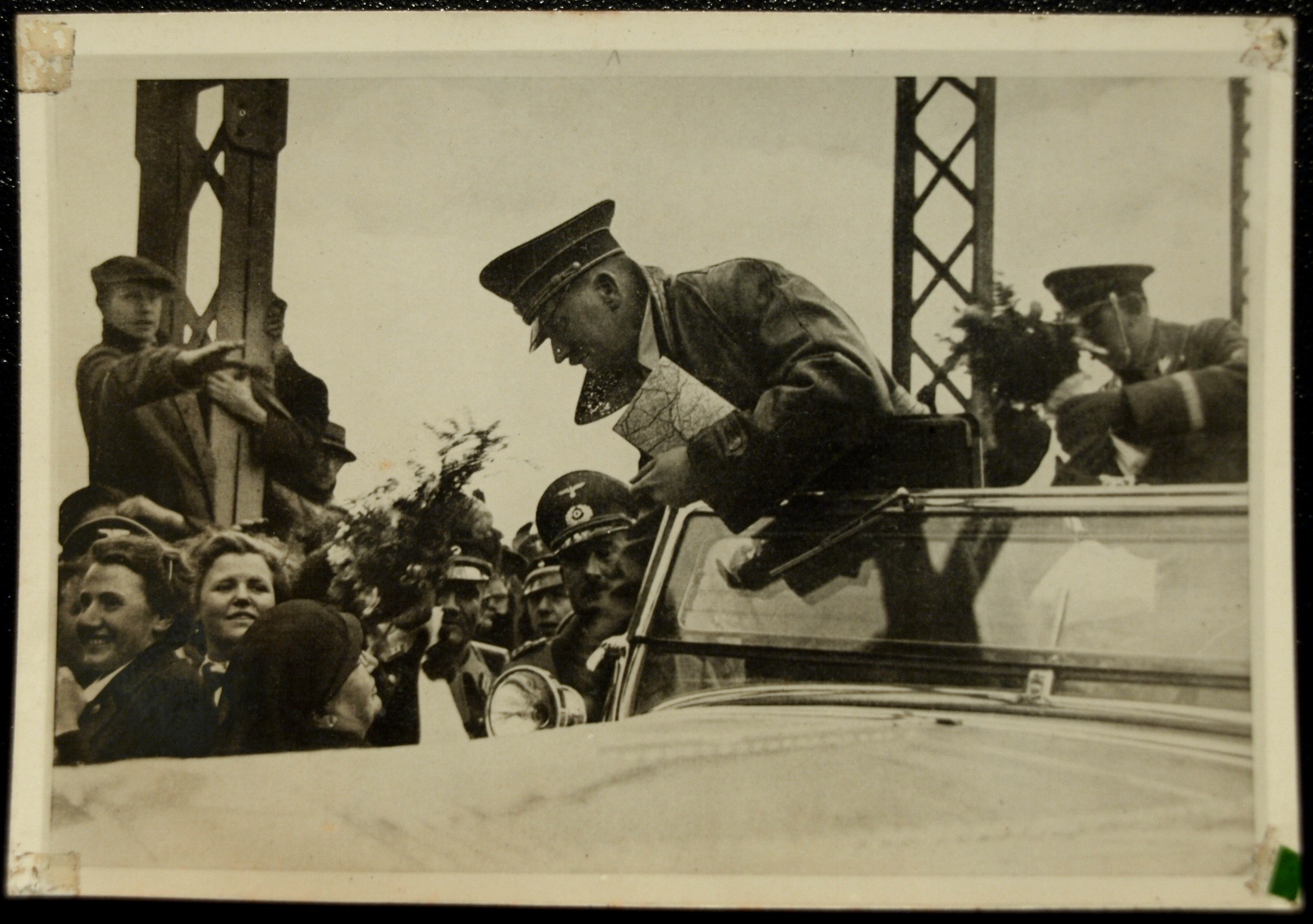
Hitler crosses the border into Austria in March 1938.

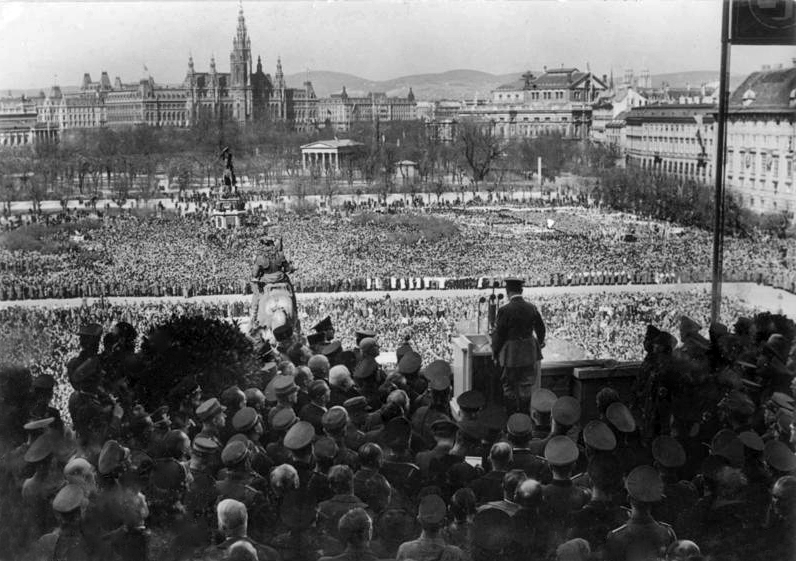
Hitler announces the Anschluss on the Heldenplatz, Vienna, 15 March 1938.

On the morning of 12 March 1938, the 8th Army of the German Wehrmacht crossed the border into Austria. The troops were greeted by cheering Austrians with Nazi salutes, Nazi flags, and flowers. (Note: Albert Speer recalled the Austrians cheering approval as cars of Germans entered what had once been an independent Austria.) The "invasion" without shots fired was therefore dubbed the Blumenkrieg ("Flower War"). Some contemporary observers doubted the authenticity of this ecstatic welcome: Friedrich Reck-Malleczewen, an anti-Nazi German conservative, recorded in his journal that:

Swarms of Berlin League of German Maidens girls have been directed here for the moment, and they wave ecstatically at the tank columns rattling through the old streets. In the next issue of the Berliner Illustrierte Zeitung they will be pictured as 'Local Inhabitants, Who Greeted Their German Liberators with Wild Ovations'.... We know all about the talent for stagecraft of Goebbels....

For the Wehrmacht, the invasion was the first big test of its machinery. Although the invading forces were badly organized and coordination among the units was poor, it mattered little because the Austrian government had ordered the Austrian Bundesheer not to resist.

That afternoon, Hitler, riding in a car, crossed the border at his birthplace, Braunau am Inn, with a 4,000 man bodyguard. In the evening, he arrived at Linz and was given an enthusiastic welcome. 250,000 Austrians gathered in Linz to meet Adolf Hitler and support Anschluss. The enthusiasm displayed toward Hitler and the Germans surprised both Nazis and non-Nazis, as most people had believed that a majority of Austrians opposed Anschluss. Many Germans from both Austria and Germany welcomed the Anschluss as they saw it as completing the complex and long overdue unification of all Germans into one state. On 13 March Seyss-Inquart announced the abrogation of Article 88 of the Treaty of Saint-Germain, which prohibited the unification of Austria and Germany, and approved the replacement of the Austrian states with Reichsgaue. The seizure of Austria demonstrated once again Hitler's aggressive territorial ambitions, and, once again, the failure of the British and the French to take action against him for violating the Versailles Treaty. Their lack of will emboldened him toward further aggression. British diplomat Frank Roberts, argued that the lack of British opposition was because of the widespread view that, “I suppose a lot of people in England would say, “well they are Germans [in Austria] after all, and if that’s what they really want.”

Hitler's journey through Austria became a triumphal tour that climaxed in Vienna on 15 March 1938, when around 200,000 cheering German Austrians gathered around the Heldenplatz (Square of Heroes) to hear Hitler say that "The oldest eastern province of the German people shall be, from this point on, the newest bastion of the German Reich" followed by his "greatest accomplishment" (completing the annexing of Austria to form a Greater German Reich) by saying "As leader and chancellor of the German nation and Reich I announce to German history now the entry of my homeland into the German Reich." Hitler later commented: "Certain foreign newspapers have said that we fell on Austria with brutal methods. I can only say: even in death they cannot stop lying. I have in the course of my political struggle won much love from my people, but when I crossed the former frontier (into Austria) there met me such a stream of love as I have never experienced. Not as tyrants have we come, but as liberators."

Hitler said as a personal note to the Anschluss: "I, myself, as Führer and Chancellor, will be happy to walk on the soil of the country that is my home as a free German citizen."

Hitler's popularity reached an unprecedented peak after he fulfilled the Anschluss because he had completed the long-awaited idea of a Greater Germany. Bismarck had not chosen to include Austria in his 1871 unification of Germany, and there was genuine support from Germans in both Austria and Germany for an Anschluss.

=== Popularity of the Anschluss ===
Hitler's forces suppressed all opposition. Before the first German soldier crossed the border, Heinrich Himmler and a few Schutzstaffel (SS) officers landed in Vienna to arrest prominent representatives of the First Republic, such as Richard Schmitz, Leopold Figl, Friedrich Hillegeist, and Franz Olah. During the few weeks between the Anschluss and the plebiscite, authorities rounded up Social Democrats, Communists, other potential political dissenters, and Austrian Jews, and imprisoned them or sent them to concentration camps. Within a few days of 12 March, 70,000 people had been arrested. The disused northwest railway station in Vienna was converted into a makeshift concentration camp. American historian Evan Burr Bukey warned that the plebiscite result needs to be taken with "great caution". The plebiscite was subject to large-scale Nazi propaganda and to the abrogation of the voting rights of around 360,000 people (8% of the eligible voting population), mainly political enemies such as former members of left-wing parties and Austrian citizens of Jewish or Romani origin.

The Austrians' support for the Anschluss was ambivalent; the Austrian population was given no choice and was subjected to extensive intimidation and suppression of the political opposition, as at the time of the plebiscite, the annexation of Austria was a 'fait accompli' as the German army had already occupied Austria and integrated it into Germany. American historian Evan Bukey argues that there was a genuine German nationalist feeling in Austria amongst at least a part of the population, and those holding antisemitic sentiments were more than ready to "fulfill their duty" in the "Greater German Reich". Bukey also states that since the Social Democratic Party of Austria leader Karl Renner and the highest representative of the Roman Catholic church in Austria Cardinal Theodor Innitzer both endorsed the Anschluss, approximately two-thirds of Austrians might have voted for it.

Similarly, Austrian historian Gerhard Botz claimed that the Nazis did not falsify the results of the referendum and assumed that the "yes"-votes were in the range of 90 to 99 percent. In addition to the takeover of power that had already taken place and the intimidation of the population through terror, Botz contends that Cardinal Innitzer's and Karl Renner's endorsements opened the National Socialist inroads to the Catholic-conservative and socialist camps, which together comprised two-thirds of the population. Moreover, Botz argues that unemployed Austrians supported Anschluss because they benefited from the German unemployment insurance program, which offered them positions left vacant by the expulsion of Austrian Jews; he also notes that the National Socialist propaganda emphasized that unemployment was all but eliminated in the Germany and appealed to nationalist sentiments while building up an internal enemy through anti-Semitism.

On the contrary, Julie Thorpe notes that endorsements of people such as Renner "do not stand on their own as evidence for broad pan-German sympathies amongst Austria’s working population". British historian Donny Gluckstein notes that Austrian socialists reacted with "disgust" to Renner's endorsement of Anschluss, provoking a split in the SPÖ. Austrian left circles vehemently opposed Anschluss, and Renner's declaration prompted many to defect to Revolutionary Socialists under Otto Bauer or the KPÖ. The relevance of Innitzer's endorsement is also disputed – he was reportedly "despised" by Austrian workers, and the Anschluss sparked Catholic protests in Austria under the slogan "Our Führer is Christ" (rather than Hitler).

According to the Austrian historian Alfred D. Low, one of the reasons why Germany did not allow the plebiscite to be held by the Austrian government was that the Nazi regime feared to be defeated at the polls; Low states that in 1938, there was "majority support to Austria's independence". Karina V. Korostelina also notes the oppression factor, writing that the Nazis "immediately began the execution of Jews as well as those Austrians who openly opposed the Anschluss." Political scientist Eric Voegelin, who fled Austria shortly after Anschluss, wrote that "there was not much doubt that in 1938 a majority of Austrians did not favor a union with Germany."

According to Hungarian historian Oszkár Jászi, writing in 1938, the idea of Anschluss was opposed amongst most political circles in Austria. Jászi noted that "the annihilation of the German labor movement showed to Austrian socialism what it could expect from an Anschluss under Nazi rule", while "Austrian Catholicism realized what its fate would be under a system which crushed the great Catholic Party of Germany, the Centrum". It was also opposed by other groups, such as the Austrian Jews as well as "old Hapsburgist officers and officials and by a considerable part of Austrian capitalism". Most contemporary writers estimated that about two-thirds of Austrians wanted Austria to remain independent.

How many Austrians behind closed doors were against the Anschluss remains unknown, but only one "unhappy face" of an Austrian in public when the Germans marched into Austria has ever been produced. According to some Gestapo reports, only a quarter to a third of Austrian voters in Vienna were in favour of the Anschluss. In most rural areas, especially in Tyrol, the support for the Anschluss was even lower. According to Evan Burr Bukey, no more than one-third of Austrians ever fully supported Nazism during the existence of Nazi Germany. According to the estimates of the Austrian government, with the voting age of 24, about 70% of Austrians would have voted to preserve the Austrian independence. Czech-American historian Radomír Luža estimated that between 65% and 75% of Austrians supported the continuation of Austrian independence. About a quarter of the Austrian population was estimated to be supportive of the NSDAP.

The newly installed Nazis, within two days, transferred power to Germany, and Wehrmacht troops entered Austria to enforce the Anschluss. The Nazis held a controlled plebiscite (Volksabstimmung) in the whole Reich within the following month, asking the people to ratify the fait accompli, and claimed that 99.7561% of the votes cast in Austria were in favor.

Although the Allies were committed to upholding the terms of the Treaty of Versailles and those of St. Germain, which specifically prohibited the union of Austria and Germany, their reaction was only verbal and moderate. No military confrontation took place, and even the strongest voices against the annexation, particularly, France, and Great Britain remained at peace. The loudest verbal protest was voiced by the government of Mexico.

Germany, which had a shortage of steel and a weak balance of payments, gained iron ore mines in the Erzberg and 748 million RM in the reserves of Austria's central bank Oesterreichische Nationalbank, more than twice its own cash. In the years that followed, some bank accounts were transferred from Austria to Germany as "enemy property accounts".

=== Persecution of the Jews ===
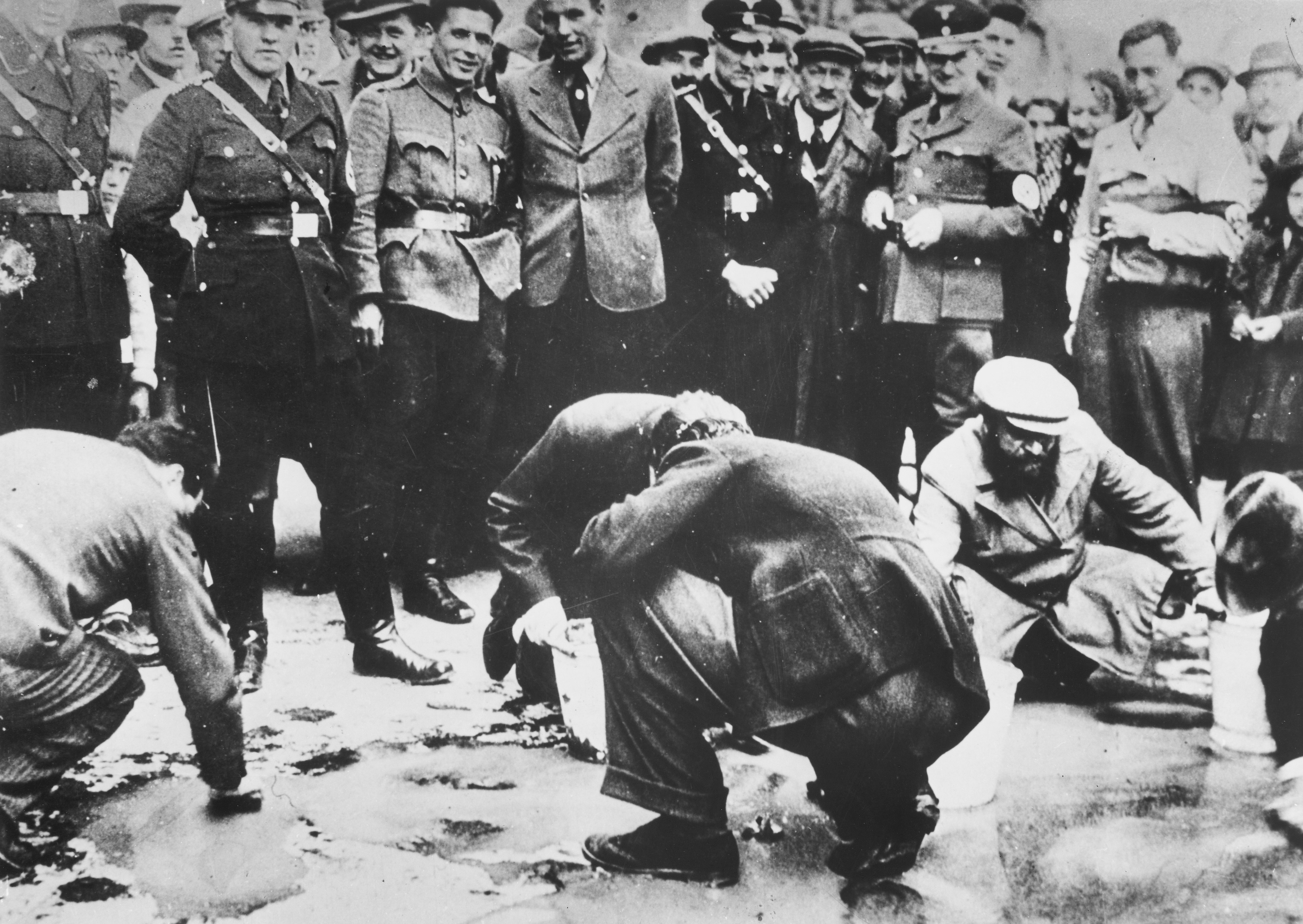
Immediately after the Anschluss, Vienna's Jews were forced to wash pro-independence slogans (Reibpartie) from the city's pavements.

The campaign against the Jews began immediately after the Anschluss. They were driven through the streets of Vienna, their homes and shops were plundered. Jewish men and women were forced to wash away pro-independence slogans painted on the streets of Vienna ahead of the failed 13 March plebiscite. Jewish actresses from the Theater in der Josefstadt were forced to clean toilets by the SA. The process of Aryanisation began, and Jews were driven out of public life within months. These events reached a climax in the Kristallnacht pogrom of 9–10 November 1938. All synagogues and prayer houses in Vienna were destroyed, as well as in other Austrian cities such as Salzburg. The Stadttempel was the sole survivor due to its location in a residential district which prevented it from being burned down. Most Jewish shops were plundered and closed. Over 6,000 Jews were arrested overnight, the majority deported to Dachau concentration camp in the following days. The Nuremberg Laws applied in Austria from May 1938, later reinforced with innumerable antisemitic decrees. Jews were gradually robbed of their freedoms, blocked from almost all professions, shut out of schools and universities, and forced to wear the yellow badge from September 1941.

The Nazis dissolved Jewish organisations and institutions, hoping to force Jews to emigrate. Their plans succeeded—by the end of 1941, 130,000 Jews had left Vienna, 30,000 of whom went to the United States. They left behind all of their property, but were forced to pay the Reich Flight Tax, a tax on all émigrés from Nazi Germany; some received financial support from international aid organisations so that they could pay this tax. The majority of the Jews who had stayed in Vienna eventually became victims of the Holocaust. Of the more than 65,000 Viennese Jews who were deported to concentration camps, fewer than 2,000 survived.

== Referendum ==
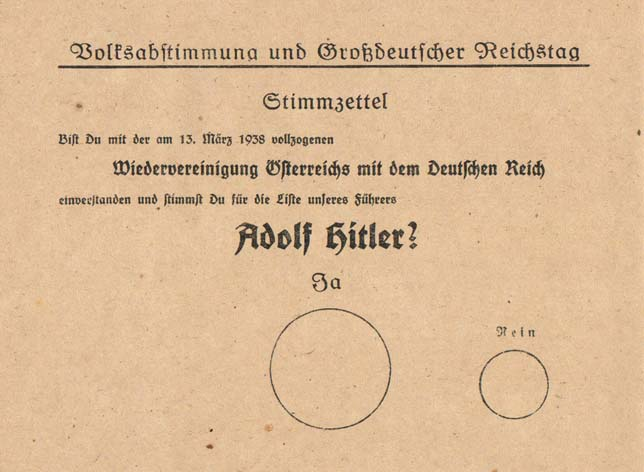
Voting ballot from 10 April 1938. The ballot text reads "Do you agree with the reunification of Austria with the German Reich that was enacted on 13 March 1938, and do you vote for the party of our leader Adolf Hitler?" The large circle is labelled "Yes", the smaller "No".

The Anschluss was given immediate effect by legislative act on 13 March, subject to ratification by a referendum. Austria became the province of Ostmark, and Seyss-Inquart was appointed governor. The referendum was held on 10 April and officially recorded a support of 99.7% of the voters.

While historians concur that the votes were accurately counted, the process was neither free nor secret. Officials were present directly beside the voting booths and received the voting ballot by hand (in contrast to a secret vote where the voting ballot is inserted into a closed box). In the referendum on 10 April, 73.3% of votes in Innervillgraten were in favor of the Anschluss, which was the lowest number of all Austrian municipalities.

Austria remained part of Germany until the end of World War II. A provisional government in Allied-occupied Austria declared the Anschluss "null und nichtig" (null and void) on 27 April 1945. Henceforth, Austria was recognized as a separate country, although it remained divided into occupation zones and controlled by the Allied Commission until 1955, when the Austrian State Treaty restored its sovereignty.

== Reactions ==
Austria in the first days of Nazi Germany's control had many contradictions: at one and the same time, Hitler's regime began to tighten its grip on every aspect of society, beginning with mass arrests as thousands of Austrians tried to escape; yet other Austrians cheered and welcomed the German troops entering their territory.

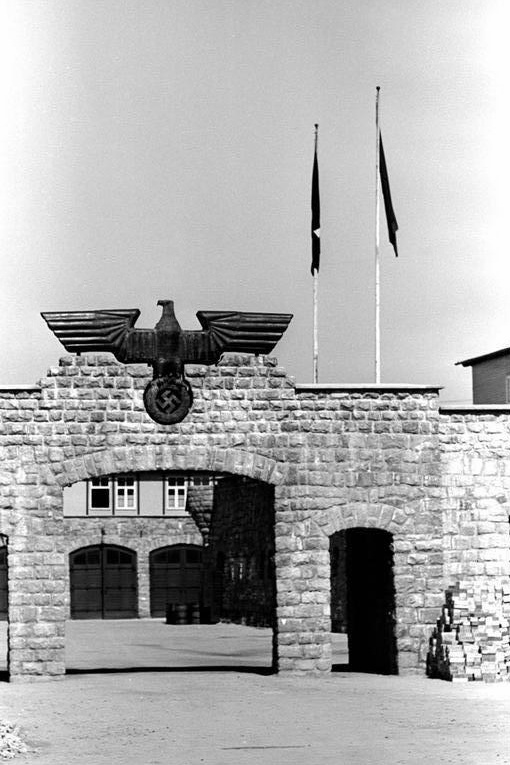
Gate to the garage yard in the Mauthausen-Gusen concentration camp

In March 1938 the local Gauleiter of Gmunden, Upper Austria, gave a speech to the local Austrians and told them in plain terms that all "traitors" of Austria were to be thrown into the newly opened concentration camp at Mauthausen-Gusen. The camp became notorious for its cruelty and barbarism. During its existence an estimated 200,000 people died, half of whom were directly killed.

The antigypsy sentiment was implemented initially most harshly in Austria when between 1938 and 1939 the Nazis arrested around 2,000 Romani men who were sent to Dachau and 1,000 Romani women who were sent to Ravensbrück. Starting in 1939, Austrian Romani had to register themselves to local authorities. The Nazis began to publish articles linking the Romani with criminality. Until 1942, the Nazis had made a distinction between "pure Gypsies" and "Gypsy Mischlinges" ("mixlings" or "half-breeds"). However, Nazi racial research claimed that 90% of Romani were of mixed ancestry. Subsequently, the Nazis ordered that the Romani were to be treated on the same level as the Jews.

After breaking off the negotiations regarding the position of the Catholic Church in Austria, Cardinal Theodor Innitzer (a political figure of the CS) was intimidated into supporting the Anschluss after being assaulted. Vatican Radio, however, broadcast a strong denunciation of the German action, and Cardinal Eugenio Pacelli, the Vatican Secretary of State, ordered Innitzer to report to Rome. Before meeting the Pope, Innitzer met Pacelli, who had been outraged by Innitzer's statement. He told Innitzer to retract his statement; he was made to sign a new statement, issued on behalf of all the Austrian bishops, that stated: "The solemn declaration of the Austrian bishops... was clearly not intended to be an approval of something that was not and is not compatible with God's law". Describing the Church's reaction to Anschluss, historian Ronald J. Rychlak wrote:

Vatican Radio immediately broadcast a vehement denunciation of the Anschluss and the reaction of the Austrian Catholic Church. [...] On October 21, in one of his last public appearances, Pius personally attacked Hitler, likening him to Julian the Apostate (Roman Emperor Flavius Claudius Julianus), who attempted to “saddle the Christians with responsibility for the persecution he had unleashed against them.”

The Vatican newspaper reported that the German bishops' earlier statement had been issued without approval from Rome. The Vatican condemned Nazism in its newspaper L'Osservatore Romano, and forbade Catholics from following their ideas or supporting Anschluss. On 11 March 1938, one day before the occupation of Austria by the Wehrmacht, the Roman Catholic Archdiocese of Vienna issued an appeal to Austrians: "As Austrian citizens, we stand and we fight for a free and independent Austria".

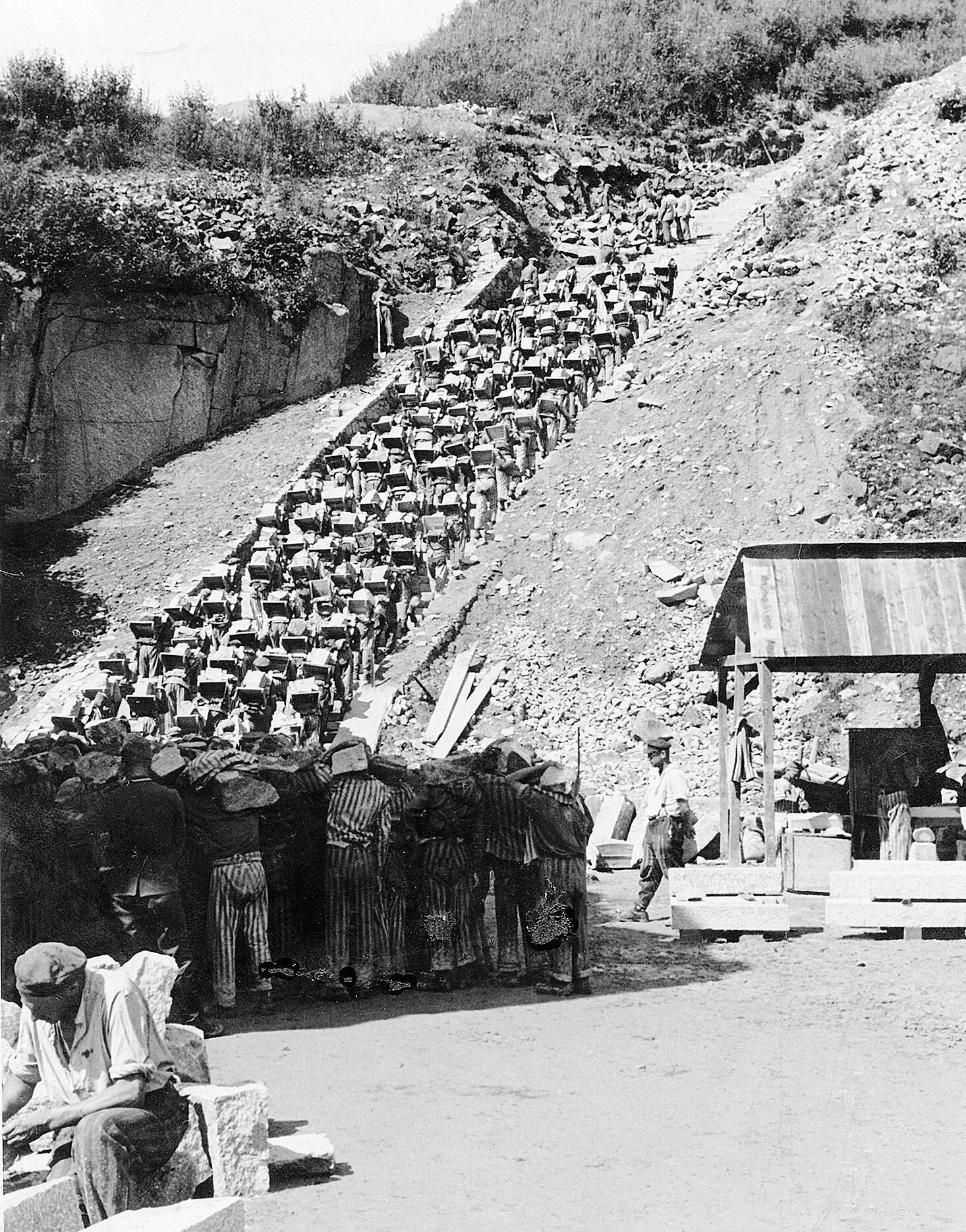
"Stairs of Death" at Mauthausen-Gusen with prisoners forced to carry a granite block up 186 steps to the top of the quarry

Robert Kauer, president of the minority Lutheran Church in Austria, greeted Hitler on 13 March as "saviour of the 350,000 German Protestants in Austria and liberator from a five-year hardship". Karl Renner, the most famous Social Democrat of the First Republic, announced his support for the Anschluss and appealed to all Austrians to vote in favour of it on 10 April.

The international response to the Anschluss was publicly moderate. The Times commented that 300 years before, Scotland had joined England as well and that this event would not really differ much. On 14 March, the British Prime Minister, Neville Chamberlain spoke about the "Austrian situation" in the House of Commons. He noted that the British ambassador in Berlin objected to the use of "coercion, backed by force" that would undermine Austria's independence. Within this speech Chamberlain also said, "The hard fact is that nothing could have arrested what has actually happened [in Austria] unless this country and other countries had been prepared to use force." Chamberlain informed the Foreign Policy Committee that the Anschluss would not alter the National Government's European policy.

On 18 March 1938, the German government communicated to the Secretary General of the League of Nations about the inclusion of Austria. And the next day in Geneva, the Mexican Delegate to the International Office of Labor, Isidro Fabela, voiced an energetic protest, stronger than that expressed by European countries, denouncing the annexation of Austria by Nazi Germany.

== Legacy ==
=== Meaning of Anschluss ===
The word Anschluss is properly translated as "joinder", "connection", "unification", or "political union". In contrast, the German word Annektierung (military annexation) was not used, and is not commonly used now, to describe the union of Austria and Germany in 1938. The word Anschluss had been widespread before 1938 describing an incorporation of Austria into Germany. Calling the incorporation of Austria into Germany an "Anschluss," that is a "unification" or "joinder", was also part of the propaganda used in 1938 by Nazi Germany to create the impression that the union was not coerced. Hitler described the incorporation of Austria as a Heimkehr, a return to its original home. The word Anschluss has endured since 1938.

Some sources, like the Encyclopædia Britannica, describe the Anschluss as an "annexation" rather than a union.

A map showing the border changes of Germany in the various years 1933 (red), 1939 (pink) and 1943 (orange)

=== Changes in Central Europe ===
The Anschluss was among the first major steps in Austrian-born Hitler's desire to create a Greater German Reich that was to include all ethnic Germans and all the lands and territories that the German Empire had lost after the First World War. Although Austria was predominantly ethnically German and had been part of the Holy Roman Empire until it dissolved in 1806 and the German Confederation until 1866 after the defeat in the Austro-Prussian War, it had never been a part of the German Empire. The unification of Germany brought about by Otto von Bismarck created that Prussian-dominated entity in 1871, with Austria, Prussia's rival for dominance of the German states, explicitly excluded.

Prior to annexing Austria in 1938, Nazi Germany had remilitarized the Rhineland, and the Saar region was returned to Germany after 15 years of occupation through a plebiscite. After the Anschluss, Hitler targeted Czechoslovakia, provoking an international crisis which led to the Munich Agreement in September 1938, giving Nazi Germany control of the industrial Sudetenland, which had a predominantly ethnic German population. In March 1939, Hitler then dismantled Czechoslovakia by recognising the independence of Slovakia and making the rest of the nation a protectorate. That same year, Memelland was returned from Lithuania.

With the Anschluss, the Republic of Austria ceased to exist as an independent state. At the end of World War II, a Provisional Austrian Government under Karl Renner was set up by conservatives, Social Democrats and Communists on 27 April 1945 (when Vienna had already been occupied by the Red Army). It cancelled the Anschluss the same day and was legally recognized by the Allies in the following months. In 1955 the Austrian State Treaty re-established Austria as a sovereign state.

=== Second Republic ===
==== Moscow Declaration ====
The Moscow Declaration of 1943, signed by the United States, the Soviet Union and the United Kingdom, included a "Declaration on Austria", which stated:

The governments of the United Kingdom, the Soviet Union and the United States of America are agreed that Austria, the first free country to fall a victim to Hitlerite aggression, shall be liberated from German domination.

They regard the annexation imposed on Austria by Germany on 15 March 1938, as null and void. They consider themselves as in no way bound by any changes effected in Austria since that date. They declare that they wish to see re-established a free and independent Austria and thereby to open the way for the Austrian people themselves, as well as those neighbouring States which will be faced with similar problems, to find that political and economic security which is the only basis for lasting peace.

Austria is reminded, however, that she has a responsibility, which she cannot evade, for participation in the war at the side of Hitlerite Germany, and that in the final settlement account will inevitably be taken of her own contribution to her liberation.

The Moscow Declaration is said to have a somewhat complex drafting history. The declaration was mostly intended to serve as propaganda aimed at stirring Austrian resistance. Although some Austrians aided Jews and are counted as Righteous Among the Nations, there never was an effective Austrian armed resistance of the sort found in other countries under German occupation.

Despite the declaration, the Nuremberg trials decided against classifying participation in planning of the Anschluss as a crime against peace, stating in the judgement of Ernst Kaltenbrunner (who was nonetheless convicted and sentenced to death for other war crimes) that "the Anschluss, although it was an aggressive act, is not charged as an aggressive war." In most cases this distinction proved a moot point, as the Nazis responsible for planning the Anschluss were either dead by the time of the Nuremberg trials, or were convicted for their roles in planning the invasions of other countries. Arthur Seyss-Inquart and Franz von Papen, in particular, were both indicted under count one (conspiracy to commit crimes against peace) specifically for their activities in support of the Austrian Nazi Party and the Anschluss, but neither was convicted of this count. In acquitting von Papen, the court noted that his actions were in its view political immoralities but not crimes under its charter. Seyss-Inquart was convicted of other serious war crimes, most of which took place in Poland and the Netherlands, was sentenced to death and executed.

==== Austrian identity and the "victim theory" ====
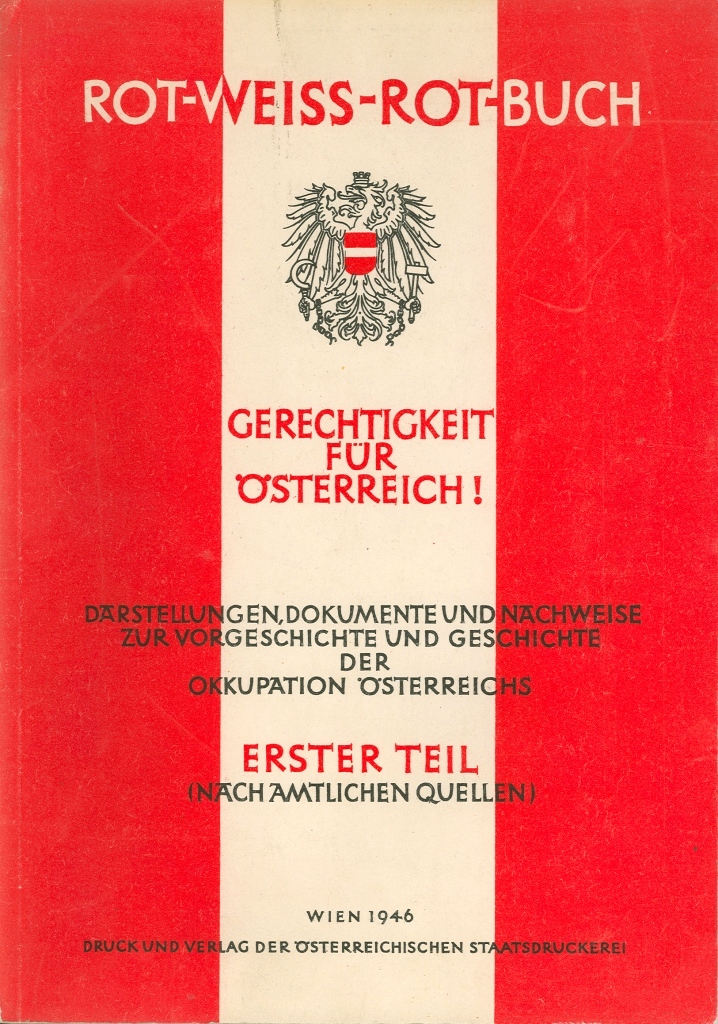
"Red-White-Red Book" published by the Austrian Ministry of Foreign Affairs in 1946 describes the events of Austria between 1938 and 1945 by the Founders of the Second Austrian Republic.

From 1949 to 1988, many Austrians sought comfort in the idea of Austria as being the first victim of the Nazis (Opferthese). Although the Nazi party was promptly banned, Austria did not have the same thorough process of denazification that was imposed on Germany. Lacking outside pressure for political reform, factions of Austrian society tried for a long time to advance the view that the Anschluss was "only an annexation at the point of a bayonet".

This view of the events of 1938 has deep roots in the 10 years of Allied occupation and the struggle to regain Austrian sovereignty: the "victim theory" played an essential role in the negotiations for the Austrian State Treaty with the Soviets, and by pointing to the Moscow Declaration, Austrian politicians heavily relied on it to achieve a solution for Austria different from the division of Germany into separate Eastern and Western states. The state treaty, alongside the subsequent Austrian declaration of permanent neutrality, marked important milestones for the solidification of Austria's independent national identity during the course of the following decades.

As Austrian politicians of the left and right attempted to reconcile their differences to avoid the violent conflict that had dominated the First Republic, discussions of both Austrian Nazism and Austria's role during the Nazi-era were largely avoided. Still, the Austrian People's Party (ÖVP) had advanced, and still advances, the argument that the establishment of the Dollfuss dictatorship was necessary to maintain Austrian independence. On the other hand, the Austrian Social Democratic Party (SPÖ) argues that the Dollfuss dictatorship stripped the country of the democratic resources necessary to repel Hitler; yet it ignores the fact that Hitler himself was a native of Austria.

It has also helped the Austrians develop their own national identity as before. After World War II and the fall of Nazi Germany the political ideology of Pan-Germanism fell into disfavor and is now seen by the majority of German-speaking people as taboo. Unlike earlier in the 20th century when there was no Austrian identity separate from a German one, in 1987 only 6% of the Austrians identified themselves as "Germans." A survey carried out in 2008 found that 82% of Austrians considered themselves to be their own nation.

==== Political events ====
For decades, the victim theory remained largely undisputed in Austria. The public was rarely forced to confront the legacy of Nazi Germany. One of those occasions arose in 1965, when Taras Borodajkewycz, a professor of economic history, made antisemitic remarks following the death of Ernst Kirchweger, a concentration camp survivor killed by a right-wing protester during riots. It was not until the 1980s that Austrians confronted their mixed past on a large scale. The catalyst for the Vergangenheitsbewältigung (struggle to come to terms with the past) was the Waldheim affair. Kurt Waldheim, a successful candidate in the 1986 Austrian presidential election and former UN Secretary-General, was accused of having been a member of the Nazi party and of the Sturmabteilung (SA). He was later absolved of direct involvement in war crimes. The Waldheim affair started the first serious discussions about Austria's past and the Anschluss.

Another factor was the rise of Jörg Haider and the Freedom Party of Austria (FPÖ) in the 1980s. The party had combined elements of the pan-German right with free-market liberalism since its foundation in 1955, but after Haider ascended to the party chairmanship in 1986, the liberal elements became increasingly marginalized. Haider began to openly use nationalist and anti-immigrant rhetoric. He was criticised for using the völkisch (ethnic) definition of national interest ("Austria for Austrians") and his apologetics for Austria's past, notably calling members of the Waffen-SS "men of honour". Following a dramatic rise in electoral support in the 1990s that peaked in the 1999 elections, the FPÖ entered a coalition with the Austrian People's Party (ÖVP), led by Wolfgang Schüssel. This was condemned in 2000. The coalition prompted the regular Donnerstagsdemonstrationen (Thursday demonstrations) in protest against the government, which took place on the Heldenplatz where Hitler had greeted the masses during the Anschluss. Haider's tactics and rhetoric, often criticised as sympathetic to Nazism, forced Austrians to reconsider their relationship to the past. Haider's coalition partner, former Chancellor Wolfgang Schüssel, in a 2000 interview with The Jerusalem Post, reiterated the "first victim" theory.

==== Literature ====
The political discussions and soul-searching were reflected in other aspects of culture. Thomas Bernhard's last play, Heldenplatz (1988), generated controversy even before it was produced, fifty years after Hitler's entrance to the city. Bernhard made the historic elimination of references to Hitler's reception in Vienna emblematic of Austrian attempts to claim its history and culture under questionable criteria. Many politicians called Bernhard a Nestbeschmutzer (damaging the reputation of his country) and openly demanded that the play should not be staged in Vienna's Burgtheater. Waldheim, still president, called the play "a crude insult to the Austrian people".

=== Historical Commission and outstanding legal issues ===
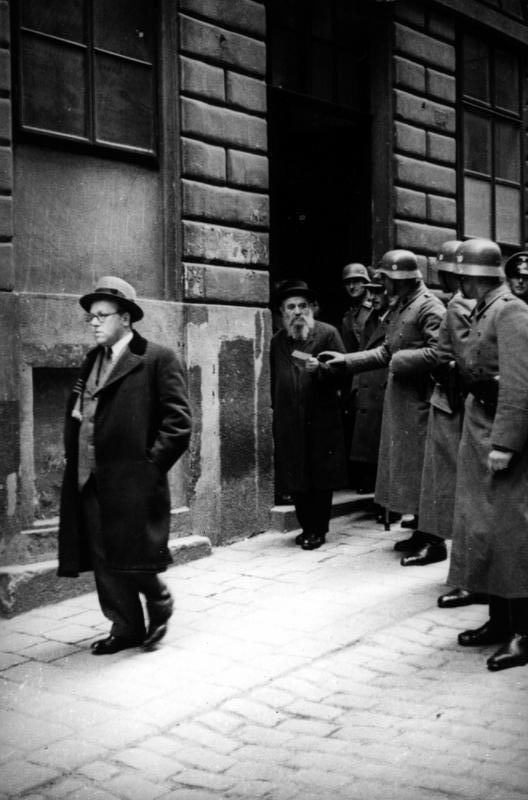
The SS raid a Jewish community center, Vienna, March 1938.

In the Federal Republic of Germany the Vergangenheitsbewältigung ("struggle to come to terms with the past") has been partially institutionalised in literary, cultural, political, and educational contexts. Austria formed a Historikerkommission ("Historian's Commission" or "Historical Commission") in 1998 with a mandate to review Austria's role in the Nazi expropriation of Jewish property from a scholarly rather than legal perspective, partly in response to continuing criticism of its handling of property claims. Its membership was based on recommendations from various quarters, including Simon Wiesenthal and Yad Vashem. The Commission delivered its report in 2003. Noted Holocaust historian Raul Hilberg refused to participate in the Commission and in an interview he stated his strenuous objections in terms both personal and in reference to larger questions about Austrian culpability and liability, comparing what he thought to be relative inattention by the World Jewish Congress to the settlement governing the Swiss bank holdings of those who died or were displaced by the Holocaust.

The Simon Wiesenthal Center continues to criticise Austria (as recently as June 2005) for its alleged historical and ongoing unwillingness to aggressively pursue investigations and trials against Nazis for war crimes and crimes against humanity from the 1970s onwards. Its 2001 report offered the following characterization:

Given the extensive participation of numerous Austrians, including at the highest levels, in the implementation of the Final Solution and other Nazi crimes, Austria should have been a leader in the prosecution of Holocaust perpetrators over the course of the past four decades, as has been the case in Germany. Unfortunately relatively little has been achieved by the Austrian authorities in this regard and in fact, with the exception of the case of Dr. Heinrich Gross which was suspended this year under highly suspicious circumstances (he claimed to be medically unfit, but outside the court proved to be healthy) not a single Nazi war crimes prosecution has been conducted in Austria since the mid-1970s.

In 2003, the Center launched a worldwide effort named "Operation: Last Chance" in order to collect further information about those Nazis still alive that are potentially subject to prosecution. Although reports issued shortly thereafter credited Austria for initiating large-scale investigations, there has been one case where criticism of Austrian authorities arose recently: The Center put 92-year-old Croatian Milivoj Asner on its 2005 top ten list. Asner fled to Austria in 2004 after Croatia announced it would start investigations in the case of war crimes he may have been involved in. In response to objections about Asner's continued freedom, Austria's federal government deferred to either extradition requests from Croatia or prosecutorial actions from Klagenfurt, claiming reason of dementia in 2008. Milivoj Ašner died on 14 June 2011 at the age of 98 in his room in a Caritas nursing home still in Klagenfurt.

=== Sudetenland ===
The occurrence of the Sudeten crisis in early 1938 led to the autumn Munich Agreement after which Nazi Germany occupied the Sudetenland. These events taken as a whole can be seen as a mimeograph of the Anschluss page in Hitler's playbook.

== Austrian political and military leaders in Nazi Germany ==
- Franz Böhme
- Eduard von Böhm-Ermolli
- Alois Brunner
- Karl Eglseer
- Adolf Eichmann
- Maximilian Felzmann
- Hans Fischböck
- Friedrich Franek
- Odilo Globocnik
- Amon Göth
- Adolf Hitler
- Alfred Ritter von Hubicki
- Ernst Kaltenbrunner
- Alexander Löhr
- Friedrich Materna
- Erhard Raus
- Hanns Albin Rauter
- Anton Reinthaller
- Lothar Rendulic
- Julius Ringel
- Arthur Seyss-Inquart
- Otto Skorzeny
- Otto Wächter
- Mauritz von Wiktorin
- Alois Windisch

== See also ==
- Areas annexed by Nazi Germany
- Austria–Germany relations
- Austria under Nazism
- Austrian Nazism
- German nationalism
- Pan-Germanism
- Völkisch movement
- Volksdeutsche
- King Ottokar's Sceptre – a fictional account of the failed Bordurian coup d'état and invasion of their democratic neighbour Syldavia, modeled on the Anschluss
- Soviet Occupation of the Baltic States
- Disgrace of Gijón, a football match in the 1982 FIFA World Cup between West Germany and Austria, which was accused of being rigged and later fans mocked it as the "Anschluss" in reference to the infamous annexation in 1938.
- Karaganov Doctrine – an idea which states that the Russian Federation should pose as the defender of human rights of ethnic Russians living in the 'near abroad.' Several scholars have found the Anschluss idea to be the progenitor to Karaganov's idea.
