= Wildauer =

Wildauer is a surname. Notable persons with that name include:

- Markus Wildauer (born 1998), Austrian cyclist
- Martin Wildauer (born 1987), Austrian strongman
- Mathilde Wildauer (1820–1878), Austrian actress and opera singer
