= EKH =

EKH may refer to:

- Elkhart station, Indiana, United States
- Ernst-Kirchweger-Haus, a building in Vienna, Austria
- Eliza Kelly Hall, a building at Clarke University, Iowa, United States
