= Josef Walter (footballer) =

Austrian footballer (1925–1992)

Personal information
- Date of birth: 27 October 1925
- Place of birth: Vienna, Austria
- Date of death: 16 March 1992 (aged 66)
- Place of death: Vienna, Austria
- Position: Midfielder

Youth career
- 1936–1947: Wiener Sport-Club

Senior career*
Years	Team	Apps	(Gls)
1947	Wiener Sport-Club		
1948–1955	First Vienna FC		
1955	1. Simmeringer SC		

International career
1952	Austria	4	(0)

Managerial career
- 1964: Austria
- * Club domestic league appearances and goals

Josef "Joschi" Walter (27 October 1925 – 16 March 1992) was an Austrian footballer.

== Club career ==
Walter started his career in the youth ranks of Wiener Sport-Club in 1936 until he made his senior debut in October 1947. He subsequently joined First Vienna FC in 1948, where he won the 1954–55 Austrian football championship. He later played for 1. Simmeringer SC by the end of his career.

== International career ==
Walter was part of the Austrian national team which competed at the 1952 Summer Olympics.

== Directorial career ==
Walter who worked as a car dealer became the managing director of FK Austria Wien in 1958, before ascending to the role of vice president in 1959, where he managed structuring the club along economic lines. This effort yielded remarkable results as the club clinched three consecutive championship titles from 1961 to 1963.

In 1963, he briefly stepped away from Austria Wien but returned to football in March 1964, unexpectedly succeeding Karl Decker as the national team's manager. Collaborating with coach Béla Guttmann, he oversaw player selection while advancing his agenda to reform and professionalize Austrian football, encapsulated in the renowned 10-point program. However, encountering partial acceptance at the Austrian Football Association's general meeting, Walter resigned in October 1964. Although some aspects of his plan were implemented in 1965, he distanced himself from this reform effort.

Subsequently reengaging with Austria Wien's management, Walter secured industrialist Manfred Mautner Markhof Jr. as club president and sponsor. Pioneering shirt sponsorship in 1967 with the Schwechat brewery, Austria Wien became the first Austrian club to do so. Following a failed merger with FC Admira, Walter briefly stepped back before returning to orchestrate a successful syndicate with Wiener AC's football section, securing Austria Tabak as sponsors in 1977.

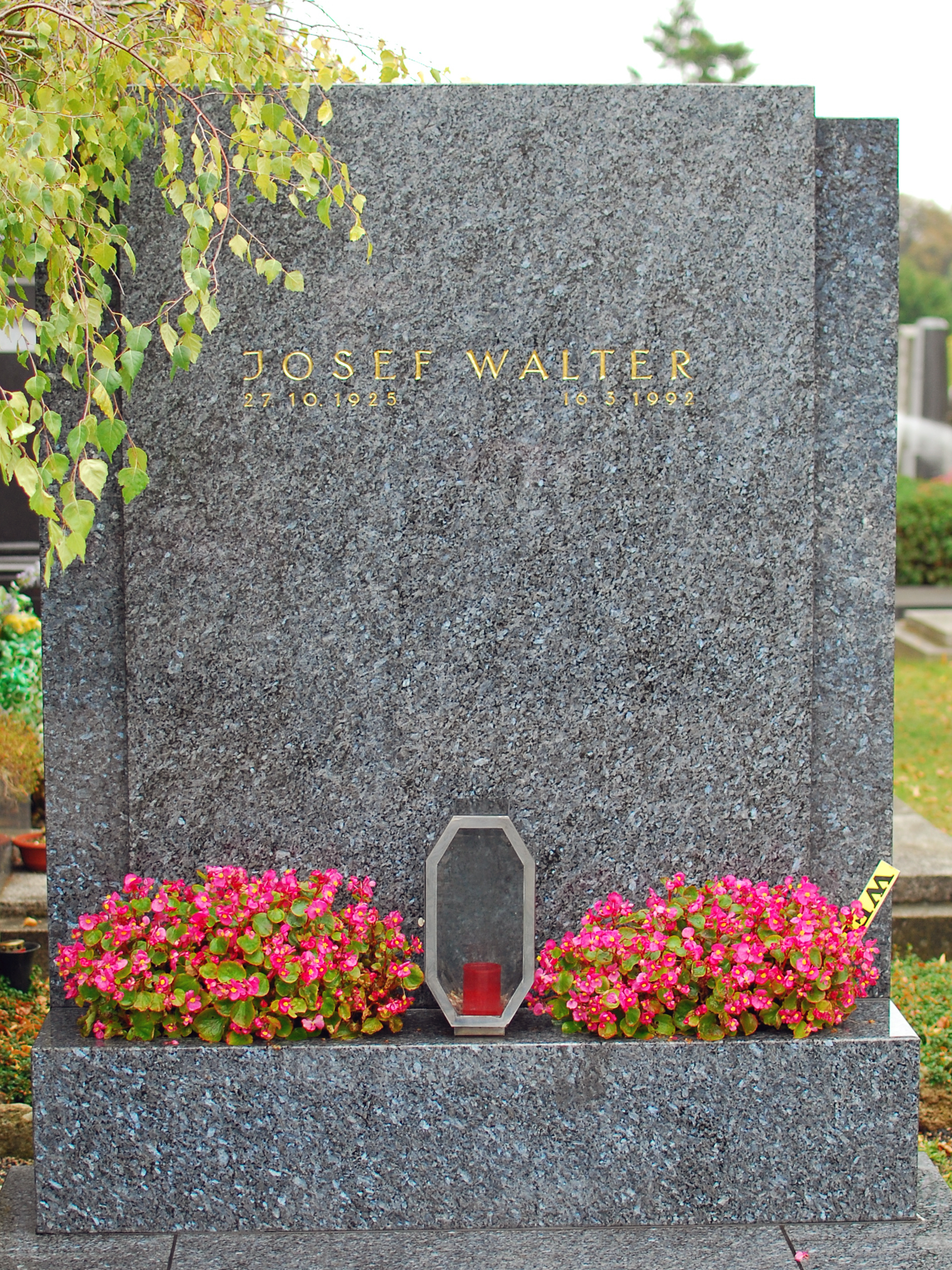
Josef Walter gravestone at Hietzinger Cemetery

Temporarily stepping away from club management, Walter rejoined the Austria Wien board in 1979, spearheading the club's economic and sporting achievements throughout the 1980s. In 1990, he ascended to the presidency, a position he held until his passing in 1992.
