= Arena, Vienna =

Cultural centre in Austria

Arena
- Logo of Arena in 2020

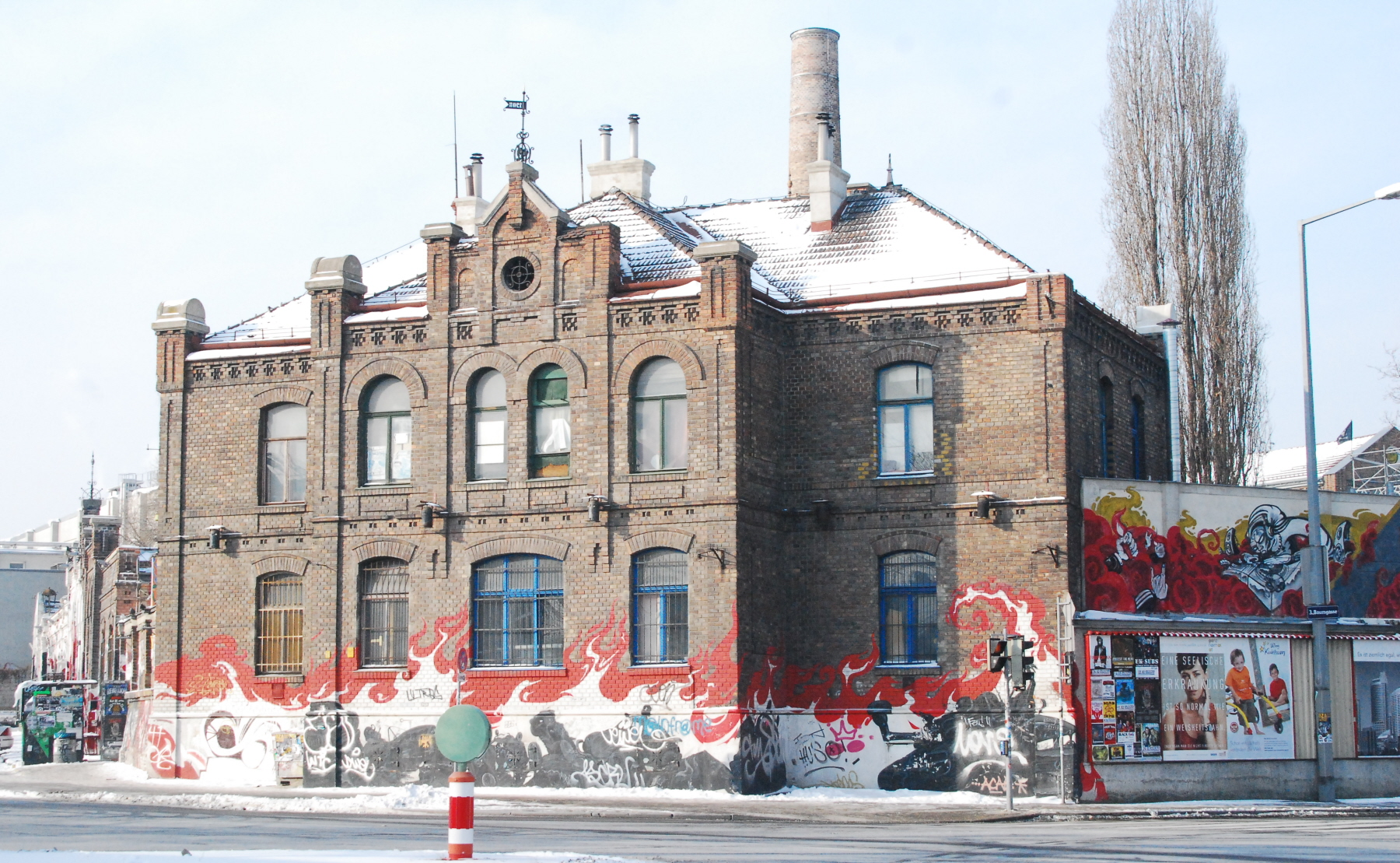
- Arena in 2012
- Type: Cultural centre
- Legal status: Ongoing
- Coordinates: 48°11′15″N 16°24′46″E
- Website: arena.wien

Arena is a cultural centre in Vienna, Austria. From its 1970s origins in an abandoned former slaughterhouse used for the Vienna Festival, the Arena grew into a centre for alternative culture. It is located at Baumgasse 80 in the Landstraße district.

== History ==
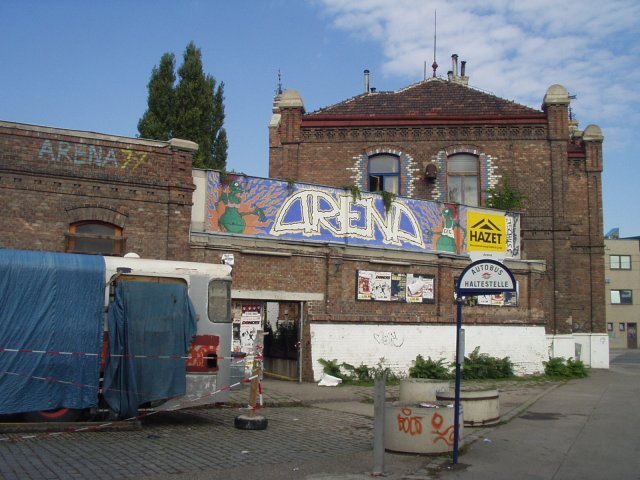
Entrance to Arena in 2006

The Arena traces its origin to when the director of the Vienna Festival (German: Wiener Festwochen), Ulrich Baumgartner, hosted theatre and cabaret productions from across Europe in the Museum of the 20th Century (Museum des 20. Jahrhunderts), which is now the 21er Haus. In 1975, the Arena moved to a derelict former slaughterhouse (Auslandsschlachthof) for performances of Jérôme Savary's Grand Magic Circus.

Soon after, some of the structures within the vast campus of the slaughterhouse were slated for demolition. On June 27, 1976, when the performances of a musical ended their run at the Arena, the audience was encouraged to stay and squat in the buildings. A banner was unveiled which said "Staying here is solidarity" (German: Hierbleiben ist Solidarität). There were around 700 activists, who called themselves Arenauten. Throughout July, participants organised cafés, a cinema, a women's house, a kids' house, a university and a theatre. A city newspaper was founded which is still in existence (der Falter). More than a thousand people lived on the site, which had 12 buildings and was about the same size as Christiania in Copenhagen. After performing there, Leonard Cohen called it "the best place to be in Vienna." A summer party drew 8,000 people. All the events were free and received favourable coverage by the mainstream media.

Thousands of people attended events until October, when the Arena was relinquished, as a result of both internal squabbles and pressure from the City Council. Two days later, it was mostly demolished, but the council tolerated the squatters staying in one remaining building, namely the domestic abattoir (Inlandschlachthof).

Alongside other still existing projects such as the Amerlingerhaus, Ernst-Kirchweger-Haus and WUK (Werkstätten und Kulturhaus), the Arena is a product of the 1970s and 1980s autonomous movement in Vienna.

== Activities ==
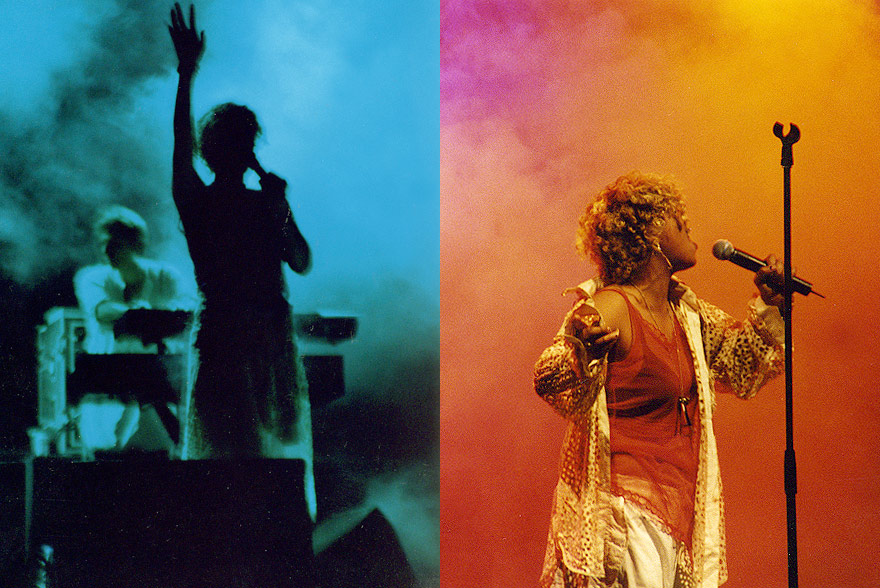
Neneh Cherry performs at Arena in 1996

The Arena has become an important centre for alternative culture in Vienna, hosting concerts, exhibitions and an open-air cinema in the courtyard. As well as the large hall, which has hosted bands like Arctic Monkeys and Sonic Youth, there are two smaller rooms for events.

== In popular culture ==
- In 1977, Josef Aichholzer, Ruth Beckermann and Franz Grafl made a film called Arena Besetzt about the 1976 occupation of the Arena.

== Bibliography ==
- Deutsch-Schreiner, Evelyn (2014). "Austria". In Nagy, Peter; Rouyer, Phillippe (eds.). World Encyclopedia of Contemporary Theatre: Volume 1: Europe. London: Routledge. ISBN 978-1136118128.
- Documenta Madrid. "Arena Besetzt". Documenta Madrid.
- Edthofer, Julia (2011). "This is what Radical Democracy Looks Like! Reclaiming Urban Space in Vienna". In Perrone, C.; Manella, G.; Tripodi, L. (eds.). Everyday Life in the Segmented City. Bingley, United Kingdom: Emerald Group Publishing. pp. 95–119. doi:10.1108/S1047-0042(2011)0000011008. ISBN 978-1-78052-259-3.
- Foltin, Robert (2016). "Vienna in March 1981: A 'Puzzling Demonstration' and Its Consequences". In Andresen, Knut; van der Stein, Bart (eds.). A European Youth Revolt: European Perspectives on Youth protest and Social Movements in the 1980s. London: Palgrave Macmillan. pp. 41–52. ISBN 9781137304230.
- Foltin, Robert (2014). "Squatting and Autonomous Action in Vienna, 1976-2012". In van Hoogenhuijze, Leendert; Katzeff, Ask; van der Stein, Bart (eds.). The City Is Ours: Squatting and Autonomous Movements in Europe from the 1970s to the Present. Oakland: PM Press. pp. 255–276. ISBN 9781604866834.
- Redaktion (22 August 2006). "Als einen Sommer lang Freiheit war - derStandard.at". Der Standard (in Austrian German).
- Secret Vienna (September 7, 2019). "ARENA Wien". Secret Vienna Tours.
- Von Horst, Christoph (10 June 2006). "Arena-Jubiläum: Kindergarten der Rebellion". profil.at (in German).
- Wien Info. "Arena". VIENNA.
- Winterer, Matthias (23 July 2016). "Der lange Schatten des heißen Sommers 1976". Stadtleben in Wien - Wiener Zeitung Online (in German).
