= Hietzing Cemetery =

Cemetery in Vienna, Austria

Coordinates: 48°10′34″N 16°17′56″E

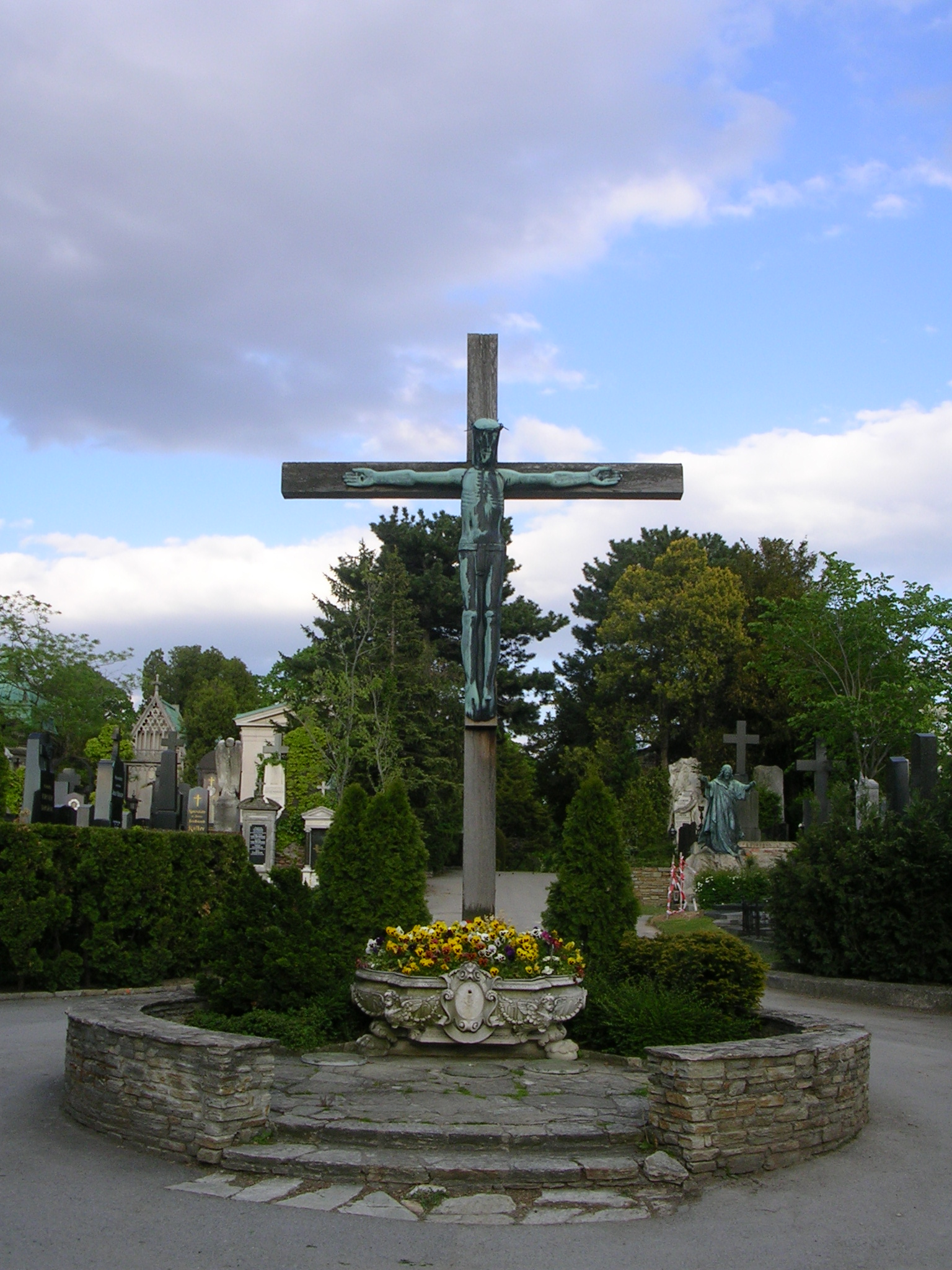
Cross at the Hietzing Cemetery

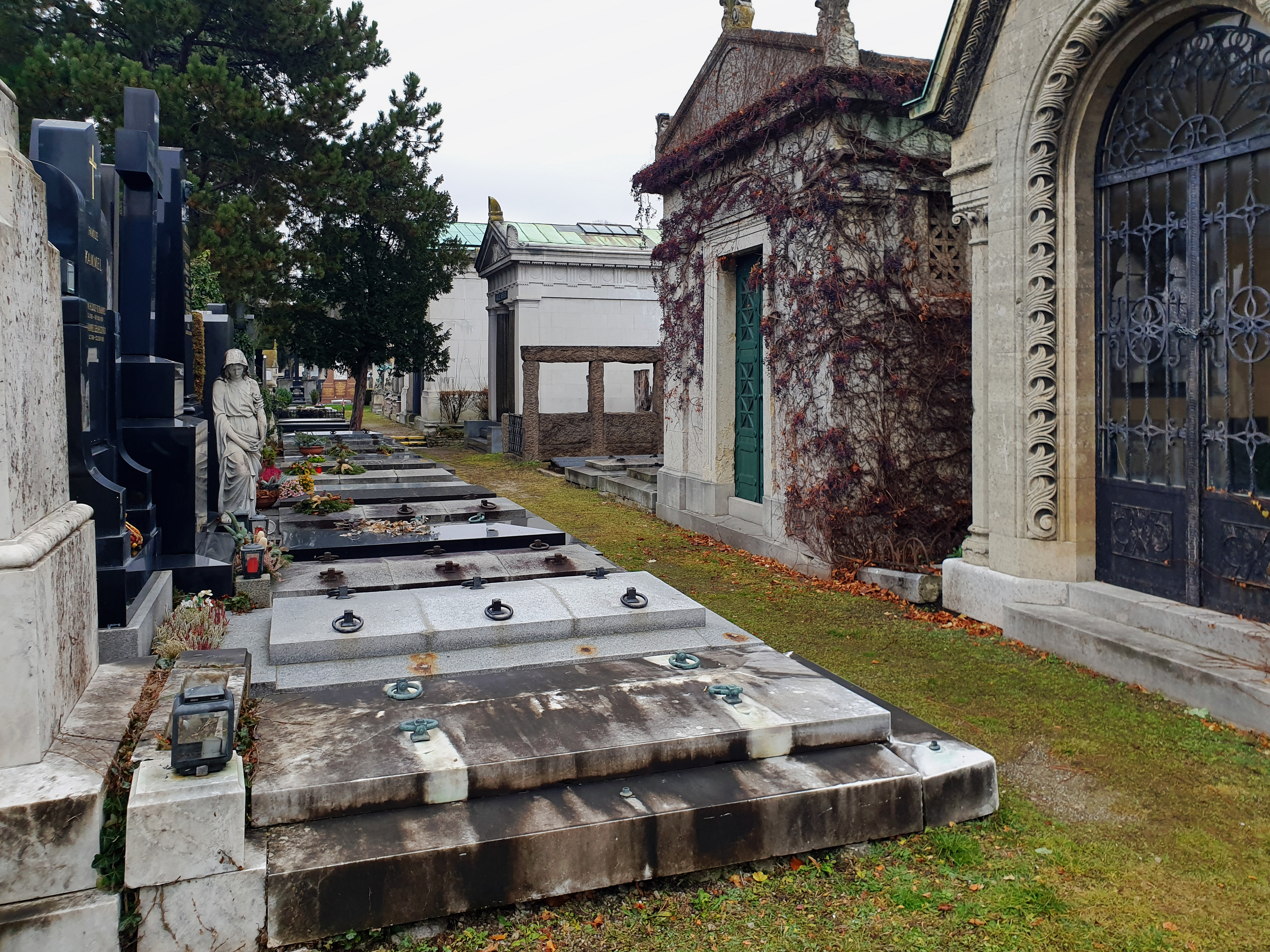
Tombs at the Hietzing Cemetery

Hietzing Cemetery is a cemetery in Hietzing, the 13th district of Vienna, Austria. Located just south-west of the Schönbrunn Palace, the cemetery covers approximately 97,175 m² and contains around 11,100 graves.

== History ==
A burial ground existed near today’s Maxingstraße even before 1786. After Hietzing became an independent parish, a new cemetery was established at its current location in 1787 and expanded several times (including in 1794, 1817, 1835, 1892, 1907, between 1918 and 1944, in the 1950s, and in 1979), eventually growing to over 40,000 m² in size. Since 1892, the cemetery has been owned by the City of Vienna and serves as an interdenominational burial site for Hietzing and the Schönbrunn Palace.

In 1913, a new chapel and mortuary were built. After several buildings in the cemetery - including the funeral hall - were damaged during the final days of the Second World War, they were restored by 1947. Renovations and modifications followed in the 1950s, 1960s, and 1970s, with the most recent redesign carried out between 1989 and 1991 based on plans by Austrian architect Christof Riccabona. The old section of the cemetery was restored in the Biedermeier style.

The cemetery is the final resting place of numerous prominent figures from Austrian history, including the Austrofascist Chancellor Engelbert Dollfuß and several notable Austrian artists such as Alban Berg, Gustav Klimt, and Otto Wagner. It is also home to many statues and memorials, including one dedicated to the child victims of the COVID-19 pandemic.

== Notable burials ==
- Alban Berg (1885–1935), composer
- Jean-Baptiste Clery (1759–1809), valet to King Louis XVI
- Franz Conrad von Hötzendorf (1852–1925), Chief of the Austro-Hungarian General Staff 1906 to 1917
- Heinz Conrads (1913–1986), actor
- Engelbert Dollfuss (1892–1934), Chancellor of Austria
- Gottfried von Einem (1918–1996), composer
- Fanny Elssler (1810–1884), ballerina
- Franz Grillparzer (1791–1872), writer
- Josef Josephi (1852–1920), singer and actor
- Ernst Kirchweger (1898–1965), victim of political violence
- Gustav Klimt (1862–1918), painter
- Viktor Léon (1858–1940), librettist
- Hubert Marischka (1882–1959), operetta tenor, actor, film director and screenwriter
- Koloman Moser (1868–1918), artist and designer
- Sabine Oberhauser (1963–2017), politician
- Rudolf Prack (1905–1981), actor
- Katharina Schratt (1853–1940), Emperor Franz Joseph confidante
- Mitsuko Thekla Maria (1874–1941), Countess of Coudenhove-Kalergi
- Henrietta Treffz (1818–1890), mezzo-soprano and first wife of Johann Strauss II
- Otto Wagner (1841–1918), architect
- Josef Walter (1925–1992), footballer
- Mathilde Wildauer (1820–1878), actress and opera singer
