= Mathilde Wildauer =

Austrian actress and operatic soprano (1820–1878)

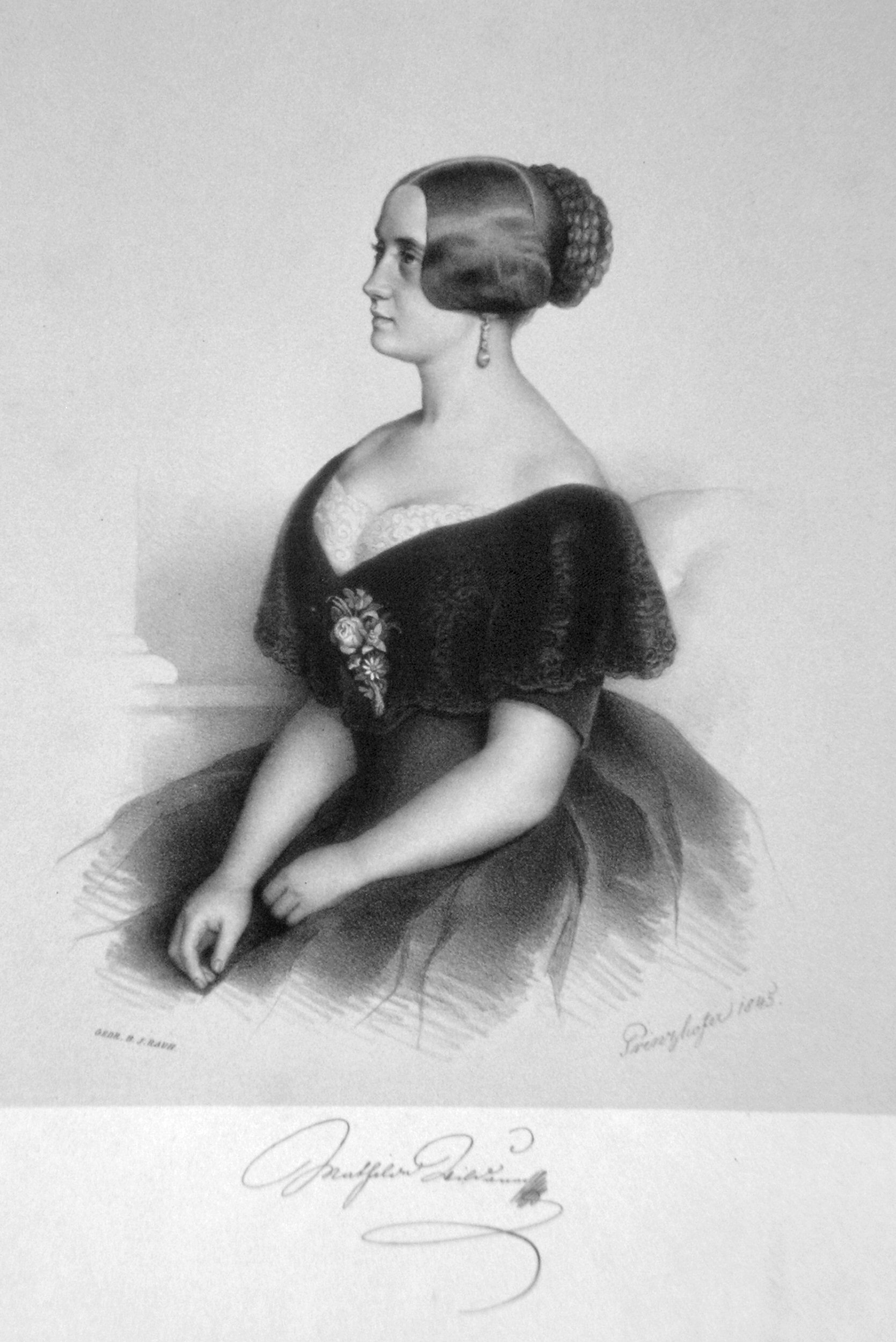
Lithograph by August Prinzhofer (1845)

Mathilde Wildauer (7 February 1820 – 23 December 1878) was an Austrian actress, later an operatic soprano, taking leading roles at the Theater am Kärntnertor in Vienna.

== Life ==
Wildauer was born in Vienna, daughter of Vinzenz Wildauer, a stockbroker, and his wife Clara. Her acting debut, after success in amateur theatre, was at the Burgtheater in 1834, as Susette in Die Rosen des Herrn von Malesherbes by August von Kotzebue.

She went on to appear in comedies by Kotzebue, August Wilhelm Iffland, Roderich Benedix and Eduard von Bauernfeld, and became well liked by the public. She was particularly successful as Katherina in Shakespeare's The Taming of the Shrew.

As an operatic soprano she first appeared in 1845 at the Theater in der Josefstadt, in operas including La fille du régiment by Gaetano Donizetti as Marie. In 1846 she appeared at the Theater an der Wien, and in 1849 at the Theater am Kärntnertor. During this period she continued in acting roles at the Burgtheater, where in 1848 she created the role of Nandl in the original production of the Singspiel Das Versprechen hinterm Herd (The promise behind the hearth) by Alexander Baumann; this was regarded as one of her greatest successes.

=== In opera ===
From 1851 she devoted her career to opera, and joined the company of the Theater am Kärntnertor. Roles included Susanna in Wolfgang Amadeus Mozart's The Marriage of Figaro, and Zerlina in Mozart's Don Giovanni; the title roles in Gaetano Donizetti's operas Lucia di Lammermoor and Linda di Chamounix; the title role in Die Zigeunerin (The Bohemian Girl) by Michael William Balfe; and Katharina in Der Nordstern (L'étoile du nord) by Giacomo Meyerbeer, who directed the Vienna production in 1855, insisting on Wildauer taking the role.

She was also successful as a concert singer, but rarely appeared outside Vienna. She retired after a final appearance in 1864, as Isabella in Meyerbeer's Robert der Teufel (Robert le diable).

Wildauer died in 1878, and was buried at Hietzing Cemetery in Vienna.
