= Ernst-Kirchweger-Haus =

Coordinates: 48°10′39″N 16°22′43″E

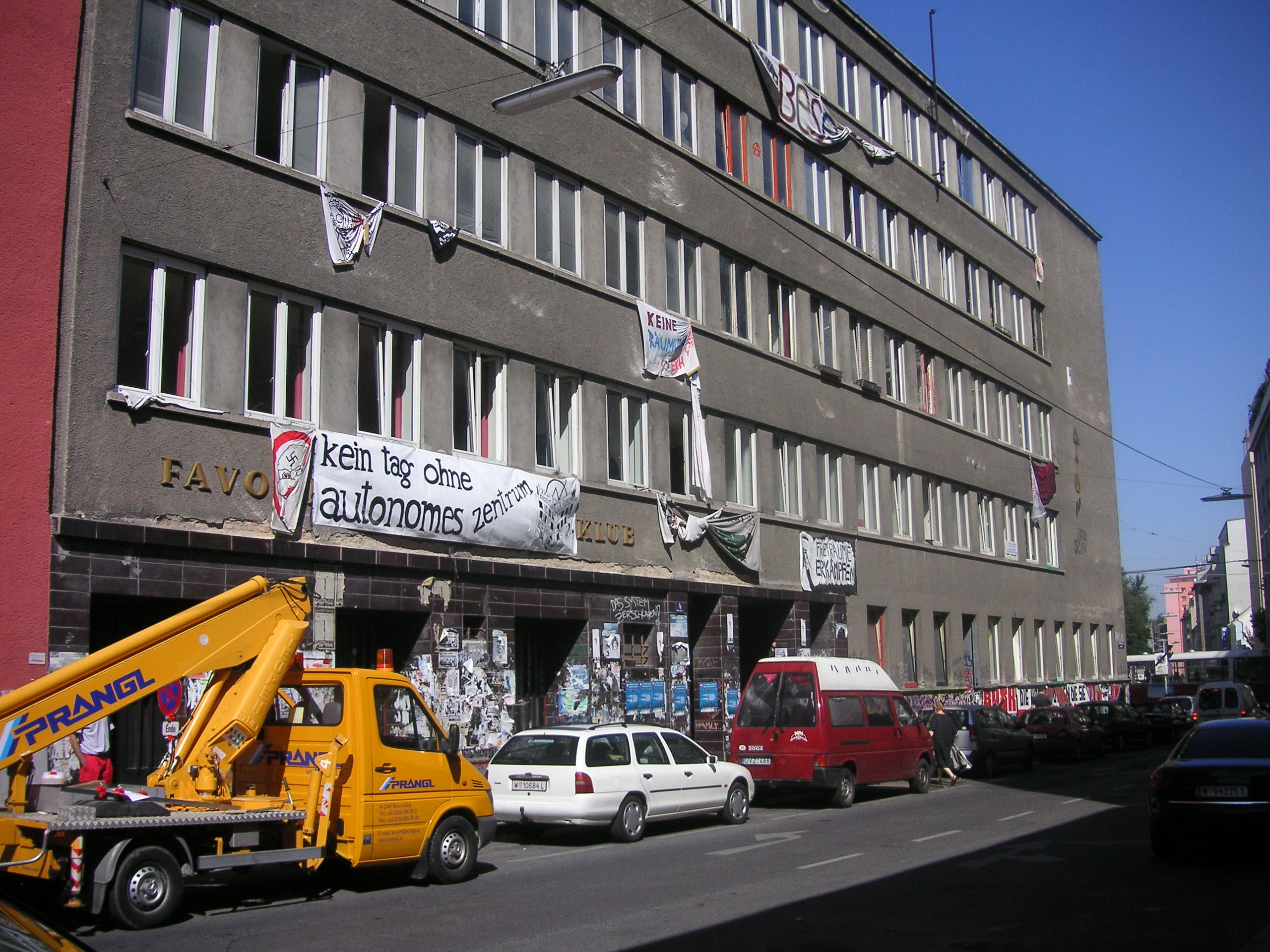
The Ernst-Kirchweger-Haus in September 2005. The large banner on the first floor reads, "kein tag ohne autonomes zentrum" ("Not a single day without an autonomous social centre").

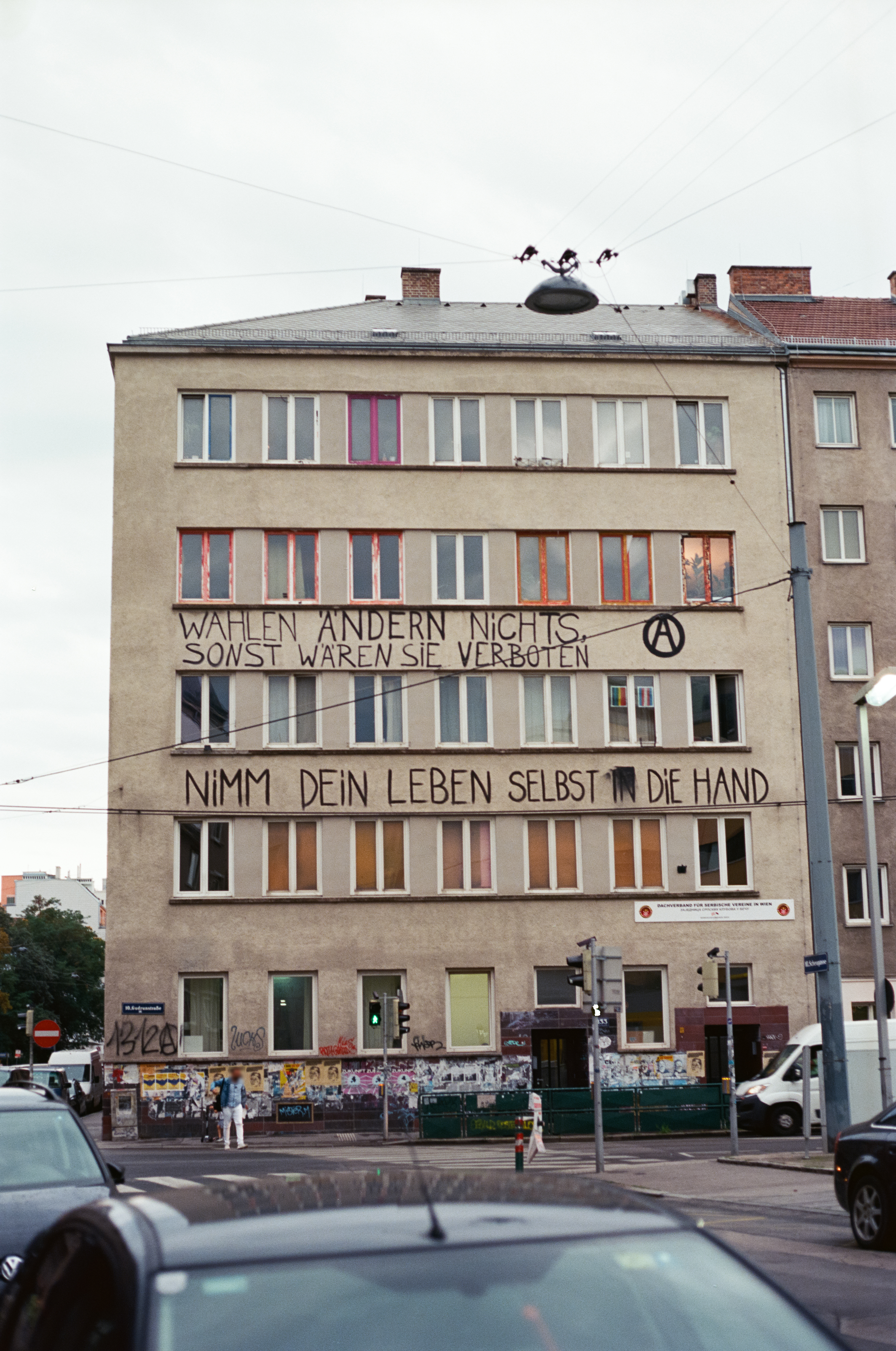
Ernst-Kirchweger-Haus

The Ernst-Kirchweger-Haus (EKH) is a self-managed social centre in Vienna's 10th district, Favoriten. It was owned by the Communist Party of Austria (KPÖ) until 2004. Since 1990, it was used as a social centre. In 2004, the KPÖ sold the building to a new owner. The project is named after Ernst Kirchweger.

== Occupation ==
The building was occupied by squatters on 23 June 1990. The KPÖ, owners of the building, eventually agreed to lease parts of the building to them. These residents, identifying as autonomous activists, established a social centre, hosting migrants and refugees, an infoshop, community activities, and political groups. The residents, who described the EKH as an "international, multi-cultural, anti-fascist centre", named the building after Ernst Kirchweger. Kirchweger was a former concentration camp inmate and member of the anti-fascist resistance, who was killed in 1965 by a right-wing protester during a demonstration against Taras Borodajkewycz, a former member of the National Socialist German Workers Party.

== Sale ==
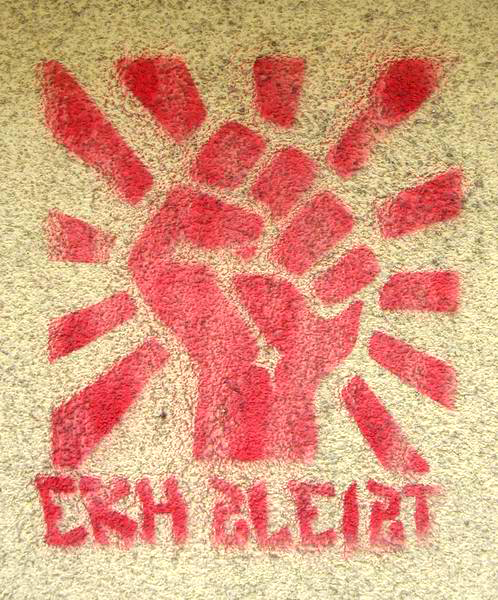
Supportive stencil graffiti: "EKH BLEIBT" ("EKH will remain").

In the autumn of 2004, the KPÖ sold the EKH to a real estate company. The KPÖ stated that it could no longer afford to subsidise the tenants, who had only been paying a symbolic rent. The KPÖ had previously petitioned the city of Vienna for financial aid, but failed to get any. Tenants disputed the KPÖ's account, stating that they had regularly paid operating expenses. The residents were threatened with eviction. The director of the real estate company was accused by the tenants of being a right-wing extremist. In July 2005, a company with close contacts to the municipality of Vienna bought the building. The tenants of the EKH agreed to start paying rent in 2008.

== 2020 disturbances ==
In June 2020, a feminist demonstration protesting the treatment of women in Austria and Turkey, organised by a Kurdish women’s organisation based at EKH, was attacked by the Turkish far-right group the Grey Wolves. In response, anti-fascists organised a counter-demonstration the next day and this resulted in 200-300 neo-fascists attacking the EKH building, throwing stones, bottles and firebombs. The situation then created a diplomatic war of words between Austria and Turkey, with the Turkish ambassador being invited to the Foreign Ministry.

== See also ==
- Arena
- Autonomism
- WUK (Kulturzentrum)
