= Taras Borodajkewycz =

Professor of economic history

Taras (von) Borodajkewycz (Ukrainian: Тарас Бородайкевич; 1 October 1902 in Baden bei Wien, Lower Austria – 3 January 1984 in Vienna) was a former member of the Nazi Party and, after World War II, professor of economic history at the College of World Trade in Vienna (today: Vienna University of Economics and Business). He remained an unrepentant supporter of Nazism after the war and the pro-fascist views he allegedly expressed in his university lectures in the 1960s sparked major student demonstrations in Vienna that resulted in at least one fatality.

== Life ==
Taras Borodajkewycz was born to Wladimir Borodajkewycz, a Galician Ukrainian railway employee, and his wife Henriette (née Löwe). During the interwar years, he was an adherent of Catholic-national ideas which attempted to combine Catholic identity and pan-German politics.

In 1933, Borodajkewycz managed to become the President of the Austrian Katholikentag (Catholics Day). The event was an important gathering of the clerical regime of Engelbert Dollfuss and Austrofascism. Dollfuss was murdered by the Nazis in July 1934; but Borodajkewycz already in January 1934 became an illegal Austrian Nazi and member of the NSDAP. His party number was 6,124,741.

He was also a member of K.A.V. Norica Wien, a Catholic Studentenverbindung that was member of the Cartellverband der katholischen deutschen Studentenverbindungen, from which he was expelled in 1945 because of his support of and membership in the NSDAP. Borodajkewycz received his doctorate in history from the University of Vienna in 1932 and worked as an assistant to the right-wing scholar Heinrich von Srbik, leading up to his habilitation in 1937 in religious and intellectual history. After a short period teaching at the University of Vienna and working as an archivist in the Viennese Haus-, Hof- und Staatsarchiv, Borodajkewycz received appointment to a professorship of modern history at the German university in Prague, where he taught from 1943 to 1945.

Borodajkewycz moved back to Austria after World War II and, despite his longstanding association with the NSDAP, was rapidly rehabilitated thanks to favorable political connections in the new Austrian government. He soon resumed his teaching career at the Vienna College of World Trade (Hochschule für Welthandel), the country's leading finance and business management school. However, his continued sympathies with Nazism were apparent. He repeatedly made neo-Nazi and antisemitic remarks in his lectures that attracted a devoted following of students who shared his conservative, anti-leftist political leanings. But Borodajkewycz's unreconstructed views, once widely publicized, unleashed a legal battle and a series of social protests that exposed tensions over how post-war Austrian society was dealing with its Nazi past.

== Espionage activities for Nazi Germany ==
By 1939, the Sicherheitsdienst the intelligence agency of the SS used Borodajkewycz’s still existing excellent Catholic connections to entrust him with intelligence operations against the Vatican. His first task was to assess the chances of who will succeed Pope Pius XI. The Alvarez/Graham study mentions that Borodajkewycz already was an SD-informer at that time and that he volunteered to go to Rome to carry out this task. Throughout the war years, Borodajkewycz continued to be an SD spy against the Vatican.

== Espionage activities for the Soviet Union ==
Hints as to the fact that Borodajkewycz offered his espionage activities to the Soviets after 1945 were already voiced by the former Austrian State President Heinz Fischer in his famous book on Borodajkewycz. Fischer maintains that the GRU officer who contracted Borodajkewycz was the then Vienna Station Chief Resident, Colonel Stern. Later studies could show that the involvement of Borodajkewycz with the Soviets was much deeper and that Soviet intelligence agencies provided him with generous funding for his numerous business activities, especially in Western Austria, which at that time – until 1955 - was under Western Allied control.

== Activities as a senior book editor ==
Borodajkewycz, after 1945, worked as senior book editor for the Salzburg-based book publishing company Otto Mueller Verlag. His major success was the publishing of the book by the Austrian art historian Hans Sedlmayr Verlust der Mitte.

The Sedlmayr book, published in 1948, was a bestseller. According to Rathkolb, Borodajkewycz received royalties in the amount of 58000 €. Rathkolb emphasized that the cooperation with Hans Sedlmayr dated back to the 1930s.

== The 1962 scandal ==
In 1962, Heinz Fischer, future President of Austria, attacked Borodajkewycz in a journal article over remarks made during a lecture, which he reported based on a fellow-student's class notes. Since he did not want to identify the student (Ferdinand Lacina, later Austrian minister of finance, who had not graduated yet and might not have been able to do so had he been revealed), Fischer was successfully sued by Borodajkewycz for defamation, and had to pay a fine. Borodajkewycz felt encouraged by the verdict and disclosed his views more openly in his lectures from that time onwards.

== The 1965 scandal ==
In March 1965, student groups, former resistance members, and unions organized a demonstration to call for Borodajkewycz's removal. The demonstration clashed with a countermarch organized by the Ring Freiheitlicher Studenten, the student organization of the Freedom Party of Austria. Ernst Kirchweger, a former resistance member and concentration camp survivor, who was watching the demonstrations but not participating himself, was seriously injured by a right-wing demonstrator. He died some days after the demonstration, becoming the first political death of the Second Republic.

In April 1965, the defamation trial against Fischer was reopened, and he was acquitted on the basis of a testimony by Lacina, who had graduated in the meantime. An appeal by Borodajkewicz was rejected. Another lawsuit attempted to implicate Borodajkewicz in Kirchweger's death, but he was exonerated.

Ultimately, Borodajkewycz was forced to take early retirement (with full salary), despite strong efforts by the Minister of Education Theodor Piffl-Perčević to defend him. During the following years, he continued to publish articles in right-wing journals.

== Secondary sources ==
- Kropiunigg, Rafael, 'The Rehabilitated Austrians and the Borodajkewycz Affair', Austrian History Yearbook 46 (2015), 360-385.
- Kropiunigg, Rafael, Eine österreichische Affäre: Der Fall Borodajkewycz (Vienna, 2015).
