= Ernst Kirchweger =

Austrian Holocaust survivor

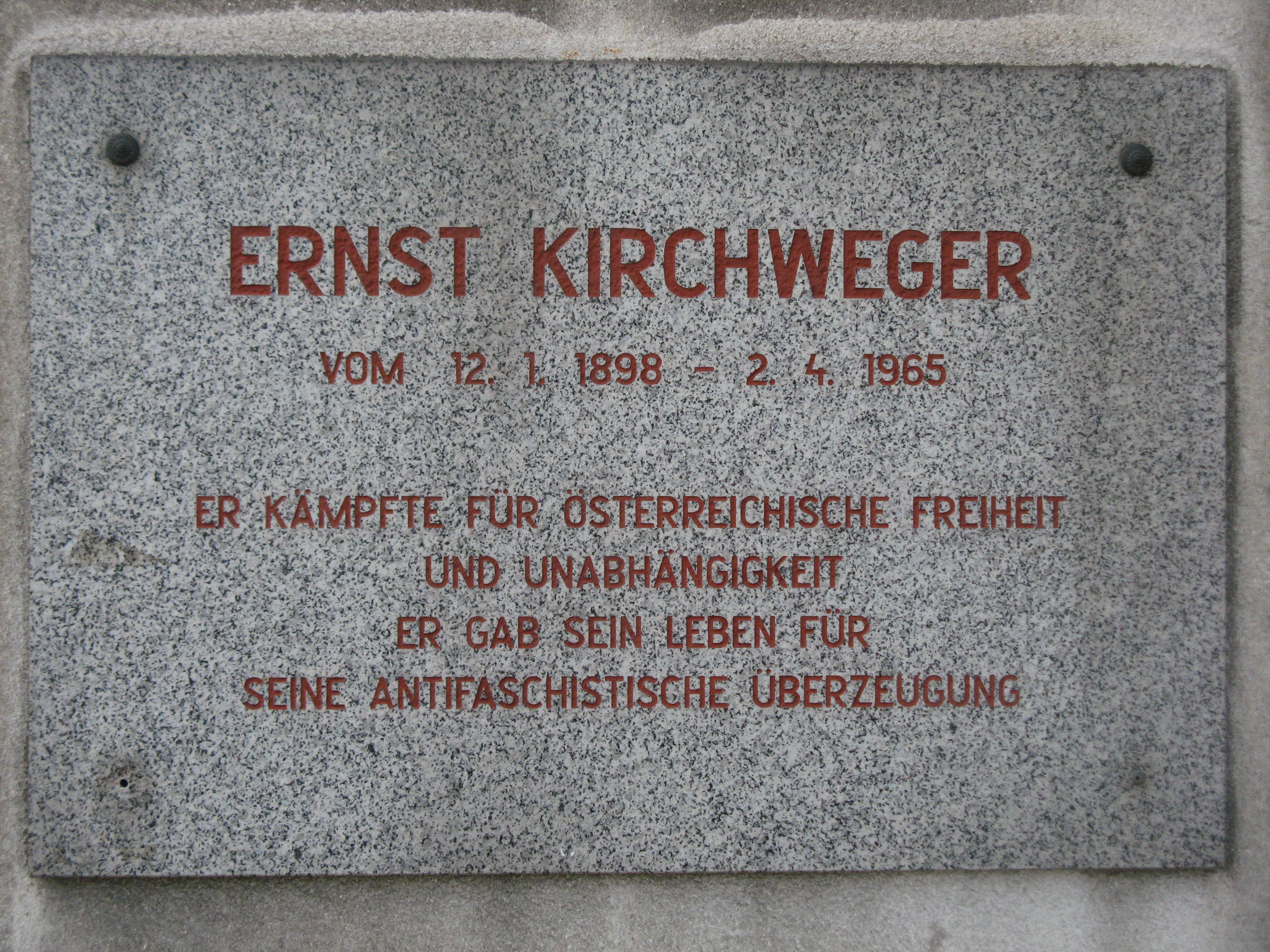
Memorial plaque for Ernst Kirchweger at Sonnwendgasse

Ernst Kirchweger (January 12, 1898 – April 2, 1965 in Vienna) was an Austrian tram conductor and publisher who is known as the first person to die as a result of political conflict in Austria's Second Republic.

Kirchweger was born in to a social-democratic working-class family. From 1916 to 1918, Ernst Kirchweger participated in World War I as a sailor in the Austro-Hungarian Navy. Afterwards, he fought on the side of the Red Army. Until 1934, he was a member of the Social Democratic Party of Austria, but then he joined the Communists, which was outlawed at that time. During the reigns of the Fatherland Front and National Socialist German Workers Party, he risked his life as an activist in illegal trade unions. After Austria's liberation in 1945, having survived concentration camp, he continued to speak out against Fascism and National Socialism.

On March 31, 1965, a demonstration of students, former resistance fighters and unions against Taras Borodajkewycz, a university professor accused of having made antisemitic statements, took place in Vienna, while the student organisation of the Freedom Party of Austria organized a riot. There were skirmishes between the participants of the two demonstrations; during one in which Kichweger was attacked by Günther Kümel and severely injured. He died three days later, aged 67, as a result of his injuries. Kümel was sentenced to ten months in prison.

25,000 people attended Kirchweger's funeral. He was cremated at Feuerhalle Simmering; his ashes are now buried in Hietzing Cemetery in Vienna.

In 1990, the Wielandschule in Vienna-Favoriten, a building owned by the Communist Party, was seized by left-wing activists and named Ernst-Kirchweger-Haus. The building has been sold by the Communist Party since.

== Secondary sources ==
- Kropiunigg, Rafael, 'The Rehabilitated Austrians and the Borodajkewycz Affair', Austrian History Yearbook 46 (2015), 360-385.
- Kropiunigg, Rafael, Eine österreichische Affäre: Der Fall Borodajkewycz (Vienna, 2015).
