= 1981 United Nations Secretary-General selection =

Selection of Javier Pérez de Cuéllar

- 27 October 1981 – 11 December 1981
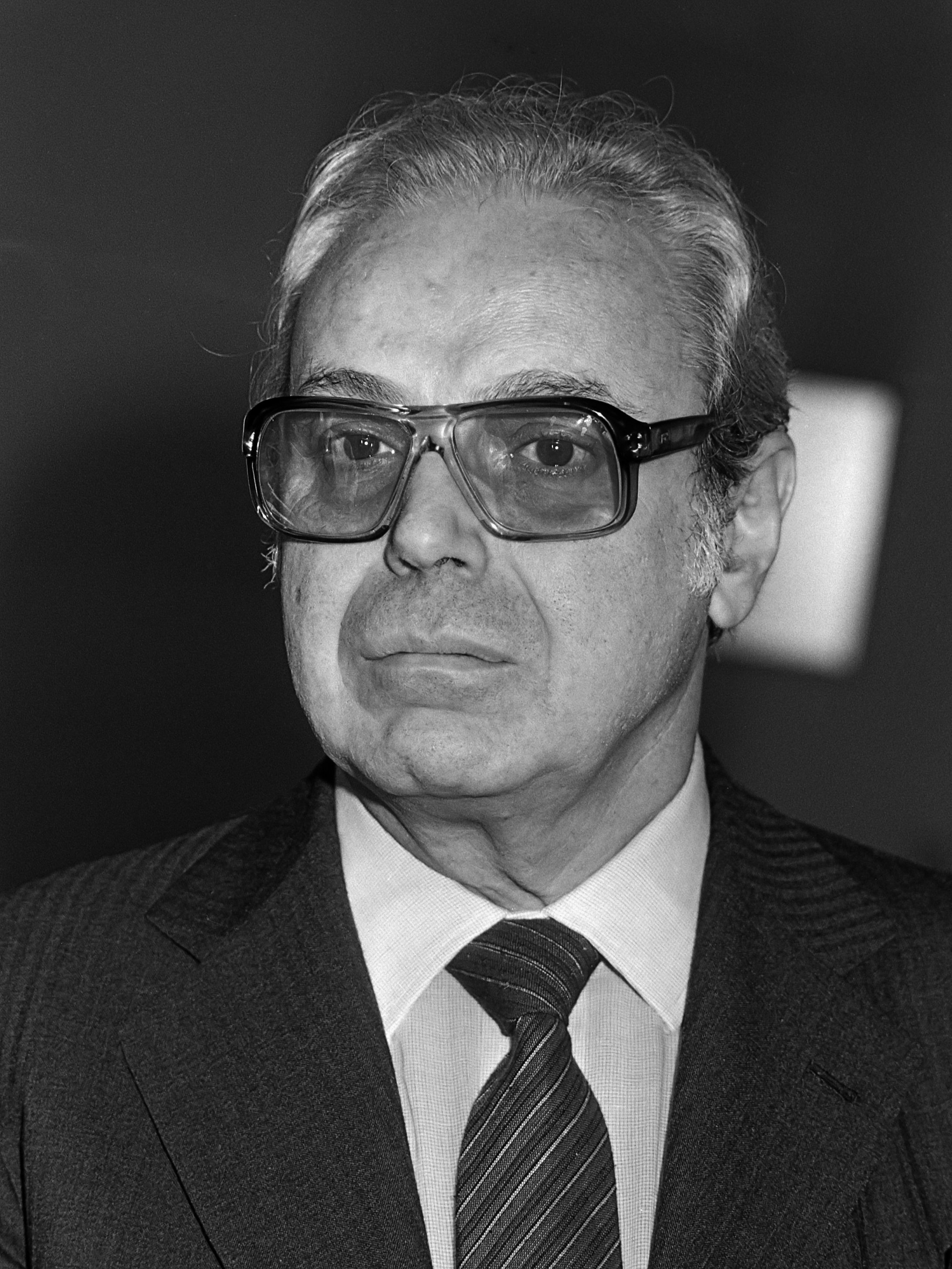

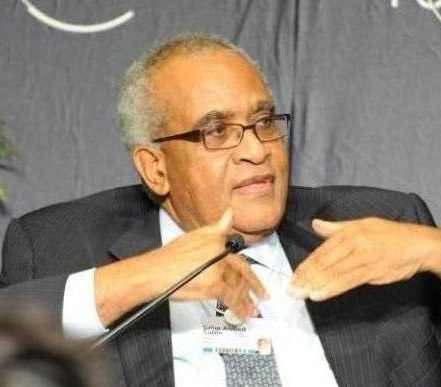

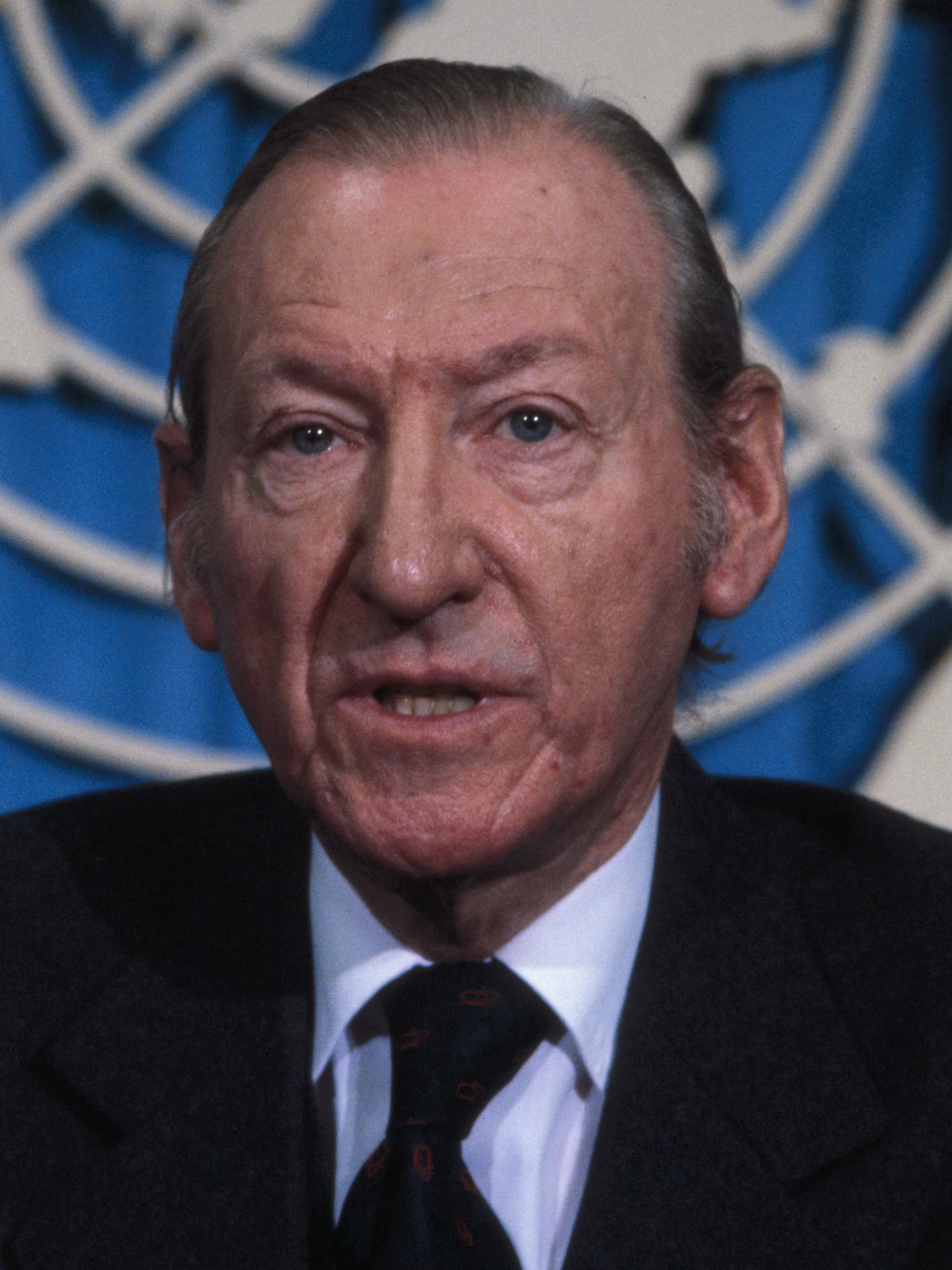

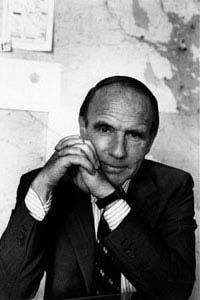
Candidate	Javier Pérez de Cuéllar	Salim Ahmed Salim
Country	Peru	Tanzania
Best vote	10 / 15	11 / 15
Vetoes	None	United States
Round	17th round 11 December 1981	1st round 28 October 1981
Candidate	Kurt Waldheim	Prince Sadruddin Aga Khan
Country	Austria	(France) (Iran) (Switzerland)
Best vote	11 / 15	10 / 15
Vetoes	China	Soviet Union
Round	6th round 28 October 1981	Straw poll 11 December 1981
UN Secretary-General before election
Kurt Waldheim
Elected UN Secretary-General
Javier Pérez de Cuéllar

A United Nations Secretary-General selection was held in 1981. Kurt Waldheim ran for an unprecedented third full term as Secretary-General, losing to Salim Ahmed Salim by one vote. However, the selection deadlocked through 16 rounds of voting as China vetoed Waldheim and the United States voted against Salim. The Security Council finally settled on a dark horse candidate who stayed home and did not campaign. Javier Pérez de Cuéllar was selected for a term beginning on 1 January 1982, becoming the first Secretary-General from Latin America.

The deadlock was finally broken by a system of straw polls, an innovation that became the standard method for selecting a secretary-general in future open selections. Waldheim's defeat also confirmed the informal two-term limit on the office of Secretary-General, and Pérez de Cuéllar's selection firmly established the principle of regional rotation.

== Background ==
The Secretary-General of the United Nations is appointed by the General Assembly on the recommendation of the Security Council. Therefore, candidates for the office can be vetoed by any of the permanent members.

In 1981, Kurt Waldheim of Austria was finishing up his second term as Secretary-General, despite Chinese preferences for a secretary-general from the Third World. In the 1971 selection, China preferred Felipe Herrera of Chile and vetoed Waldheim twice before abstaining. In the 1976 selection, China voted for Luis Echeverría Álvarez of Mexico and cast one symbolic veto against Waldheim. However, Waldheim crushed Echeverría in the second round by 14 votes to 3, and even China voted for Waldheim.

== Candidates ==
On 11 September 1981, Waldheim announced his candidacy for an unprecedented third full term as secretary-general. No previous Secretary-General had ever served more than two full terms. Although U Thant had been selected three times, his first two terms were short terms that added up to one full term. As Waldheim campaigned for re-selection, he received the endorsement of the United Kingdom and unofficial support from the United States, the Soviet Union, and France. However, Waldheim left Beijing empty-handed, and China again insisted that the next Secretary-General must come from the Third World.

Salim Ahmed Salim of Tanzania was the only other candidate to be nominated. Salim was the President of the General Assembly and had the endorsement of the Organisation of African Unity and the Non-Aligned Movement, which added up to a majority of the votes in the General Assembly. In the Security Council, he could also count on China to veto the incumbent. However, Salim was opposed by the Reagan administration in the United States, which regarded him as an anti-American radical who was hostile to South Africa and supported Palestinian statehood. The Soviet Union also opposed Salim for his activism and his pro-China stance. However, the U.S. veto would allow the Soviet Union to abstain so that it could avoid voting against the Third World.

Diplomats expected both candidates to receive the nine votes needed for selection as secretary-general. However, the United States was expected to veto Salim, while China announced that it would veto Waldheim. Diplomats believed that China would eventually change its veto to an abstention, as it had done in 1971 and 1976.

== Voting ==
On 27 October 1981, the Security Council met in closed session to select a secretary-general. Salim won the first vote with 11 votes to Waldheim's 10. However, Salim was vetoed by the United States, and Waldheim was vetoed by China. Support for Salim dropped steadily until he received only 6 votes in the fourth round, as diplomats believed that the United States was irrevocably opposed to Salim's candidacy. However, China continued to veto Waldheim, and the Security Council adjourned after four ballots.

The Security Council voted twice more on 28 October 1981 and held another two ballots on 4 November 1981. Waldheim received 10–11 votes, while Salim received 8–9 votes. However, China continued to veto Waldheim, and the United States continued to veto or vote against Salim.

Vice President George H. W. Bush led the opposition to Salim, who had led the cheering in the General Assembly when Ambassador Bush lost a key vote on the Chinese seat at the U.N. in 1971. Meanwhile, Salim promised to act impartially if he became Secretary-General, as he would no longer have to represent his own country's interests as a Tanzanian delegate. Although he personally opposed apartheid, Salim said, "One is not secretary general of all nations minus South Africa, or anyone else."

On 12 November 1981, U.S. representative Jeane Kirkpatrick checked into the hospital after suffering chest pains on a flight between Washington and New York City. After Kirkpatrick was released from the hospital, the Security Council met again on 17 November 1981, for a final effort. In eight rounds of voting, Waldheim dropped to 9 votes, his worst showing so far. Salim managed 9 votes in the first two rounds and then returned to his usual 8 votes. China and the United States each remained opposed to the other country's candidate.

=== Voting results ===
United Nations Secretary-General selection voting results
Date	Round	Kurt Waldheim				Salim Ahmed Salim			
Date	Round	For	Against	Abstain	Vetoes	For	Against	Abstain	Vetoes
27 October 1981	1	10	4	1	China	11	2	2	United States
27 October 1981	2	10	4	1	China	10	?	?	United States
27 October 1981	3	10	4	1	China	8	?	?	United States
27 October 1981	4	10	4	1	China	6	?	?	United States
28 October 1981	5	11	4	0	China	8	1	6	United States
28 October 1981	6	11	4	0	China	8	2	5	United States
4 November 1981	7	10	4	1	China	9	2	4	United States
4 November 1981	8	10	4	1	China	8	3	4	United States
17 November 1981	9–10	9	?	?	China	9	?	?	United States
17 November 1981	11–16	9	?	?	China	8	?	?	United States

== Breaking the deadlock ==
Jeane Kirkpatrick described the situation as "a deadlock within a deadlock." The Security Council could not decide on a secretary-general, but the Third World countries would not nominate any other candidates as long as Salim remained in the race. However, Salim would not withdraw from the race unless Waldheim also withdrew. Waldheim's aides claimed that they had been "deceived" by the Chinese into believing that there would only be a symbolic veto. Carlos Ortiz de Rozas of Argentina, who had defeated Waldheim in the 1971 selection but was vetoed by the Soviet Union, expressed his opinion that no Secretary-General should serve more than two terms. Even Waldheim's supporters criticized him for allowing his personal ambition to damage the prestige of the Secretary-Generalship by seeking a third term.

U.S. Ambassador Jeane Kirkpatrick suggested that the Security Council could start drafting candidates. As long as the candidate did not withdraw after being nominated, the Security Council could vote on him alongside Waldheim and Salim. Since Africa had already tried and failed to get Salim into the office, attention turned to potential candidates from Latin America.

In December, Olara Otunnu of Uganda took over the rotating Presidency of the Security-Council. Although Otunnu had led the campaign to select Salim, the new Security Council President sought to break the deadlock by asking both candidates to withdraw. On 3 December 1981, Kurt Waldheim announced that he would no longer allow his name to appear on further ballots. Salim Ahmed Salim waited a few days to see if the United States would withdraw its veto, but Salim also removed his name from the ballot on 8 December 1981. After six weeks of deadlock and an unprecedented 16 rounds of voting, the 1981 selection finally opened up to other candidates.

=== New candidates ===
Nine candidates were nominated for the position of Secretary-General. All of the candidates came from the Third World, as China had made it clear that it would only allow candidates from Africa, Asia, or Latin America.

Official candidates
Image	Candidate	Position	Nominated by	Regional group	Notes
	Prince Sadruddin Aga Khan	United Nations High Commissioner for Refugees (1965–1977)	Jordan	Asian Group	Triple-citizen of France, Iran, and Switzerland, but nominated by a country that he was not a citizen of.
	Carlos Julio Arosemena Monroy	Former President of Ecuador	Ecuador	Latin American Group	
	Jorge Illueca	Minister of Foreign Affairs (Panama)	Panama	Latin American Group	
	Carlos Ortiz de Rozas	Ambassador of Argentina to the United Kingdom	Argentina	Latin American Group	Defeated Kurt Waldheim in 1971 selection, but vetoed by Soviet Union
	Javier Pérez de Cuéllar	Former Under-Secretary-General of the United Nations for Special Political Affairs	Peru	Latin American Group	
	Santiago Quijano Caballero	Director of External Relations at the United Nations Office in Geneva	Colombia	Latin American Group	
	Shridath Ramphal	Commonwealth Secretary-General	Guyana	Latin American Group	
	Radha Krishna Ramphul	Ambassador of Mauritius to the United Nations	Mauritius	African Group	
	Rafael M. Salas	Head of United Nations Population Fund	Philippines	Asian Group	

The Soviet Union was expected to veto several of the candidates. Prince Sadruddin Aga Khan had grown up in Europe and attended school in the United States. Shridath Ramphal headed the Commonwealth of Nations and had close ties to the United Kingdom. Latin American candidates were considered to fall within the U.S. sphere of influence. However, Javier Pérez de Cuéllar had extensive dealings with the Soviet Union, and he was the only Latin American candidate who was considered acceptable to the Soviets.

=== Straw poll and formal vote ===
Security Council President Olara Otunnu devised a procedure to narrow down the list of candidates. The Security Council would vote in a secret ballot, in which the permanent members received blue ballots and the non-permanent members received white ballots. The permanent members would vote to "discourage" candidates, while the rotating members would vote to "encourage" candidates. The President of the Security Council would ask candidates to withdraw from the race if they had been "discouraged" by a permanent member or did not receive enough votes from rotating members.

On 11 December 1981, the Security Council met for the first straw poll. Prince Sadruddin Aga Khan won the poll but was vetoed by the Soviet Union. Javier Pérez de Cuéllar fell one vote short of the nine votes required for selection, but he received no vetoes. The Security Council applauded as Otunnu read out the results. With the selection now in its seventh week, the deadlock was finally broken. Pérez de Cuéllar, a dark horse candidate who stayed in Lima during the selection and did not campaign for office, became the clear favorite. Otunnu immediately moved to a formal vote.

The Security Council rallied around the favorite and selected Javier Pérez de Cuéllar of Peru to be Secretary-General for a five-year term beginning 1 January 1982. The General Assembly ratified his selection by acclamation on 15 December 1981. Pérez became the first U.N. Secretary-General from Latin America.

United Nations Secretary-General selection results, 11 December 1981
Candidate	Straw poll		17th round			
Candidate	E	D	For	Against	Abstain	Vetoes
(France) (Iran) (Switzerland) Prince Sadruddin Aga Khan	9	Soviet Union	9	2	4	Soviet Union
(Ecuador) Carlos Julio Arosemena Monroy						
(Panama) Jorge Illueca			Withdrawn			
(Argentina) Carlos Ortiz de Rozas			6			
(Peru) Javier Pérez de Cuéllar	8	None	10	1	4	None
(Colombia) Santiago Quijano Caballero						
(Guyana) Shridath Ramphal			4			
(Mauritius) Radha Krishna Ramphul			Withdrawn			
(Philippines) Rafael M. Salas						

== Conclusions ==
Since the Third World held a majority of the votes in the General Assembly, diplomats expected that Waldheim would be the last European to hold the office, and all future Secretaries-General would come from the Third World. China's record 16 vetoes of Kurt Waldheim also established it as a power broker at the United Nations, after spending its first ten years on the sidelines.

However, the selection also demonstrated the limits to the Third World's diplomatic power. Although China succeeded in removing Kurt Waldheim, it was unable to replace him with a Third World activist like Salim Ahmed Salim. Both superpowers objected to Salim and were able to keep him out of office. The compromise candidate, Javier Pérez de Cuéllar, had been closely associated with Waldheim and was acceptable to all sides. The Third World also failed to present a united front during the 16-round deadlock by voting as a bloc. A diplomat from the Third World explained, "China was allowed to save face but it was not in a position, in the end, to modify the prevailing order."

Many precedents were set in 1981 for future selections. Olara Otunnu won acclaim from diplomats for his role in breaking the deadlock. The straw poll procedure that he devised would be adapted for use in future Secretary-General selections. Kurt Waldheim's defeat confirmed the term limit of two full terms, and no Secretary-General would ever again run for a third term. China became the enforcer of regional rotation, announcing which regional group it would support in each selection. Contrary to expectations, Europe was not excluded from the rotation. After 35 years of U.N. Secretaries-General from the Third World, the 2016 selection was won by António Guterres of Portugal, who became the first European Secretary-General since Kurt Waldheim.

== 1986 selection ==
As Javier Pérez de Cuéllar's first term came to a close in 1986, the United Nations faced mounting financial difficulties. After the United States Congress cut the U.S. contribution to the U.N., Pérez de Cuéllar said that he would only serve another term if the Reagan administration would agree to pay the U.S. dues. Pérez de Cuéllar, who had undergone quadruple-bypass surgery in August 1986, said, "I don't have to make a sacrifice and die with my ship." If he could live his life over again, he said he would have become a concert pianist instead of Secretary-General, "but in my country, that was only for girls."

On 2 October 1986, ambassadors from the permanent members of the Security Council met with Pérez and drafted him to serve another term. On 10 October 1986, the Security Council voted unanimously to select Javier Pérez de Cuéllar for a second term as secretary-general. Although Pérez received only "hints" of financial support for the U.N., he felt obligated to accept his selection. "To decline in such circumstances would have been tantamount to abandoning a moral duty toward the United Nations," he said in his acceptance speech.
