= 1991 United Nations Secretary-General selection =

Selection of Boutros Boutros-Ghali

- 10 October 1991 – 21 November 1991
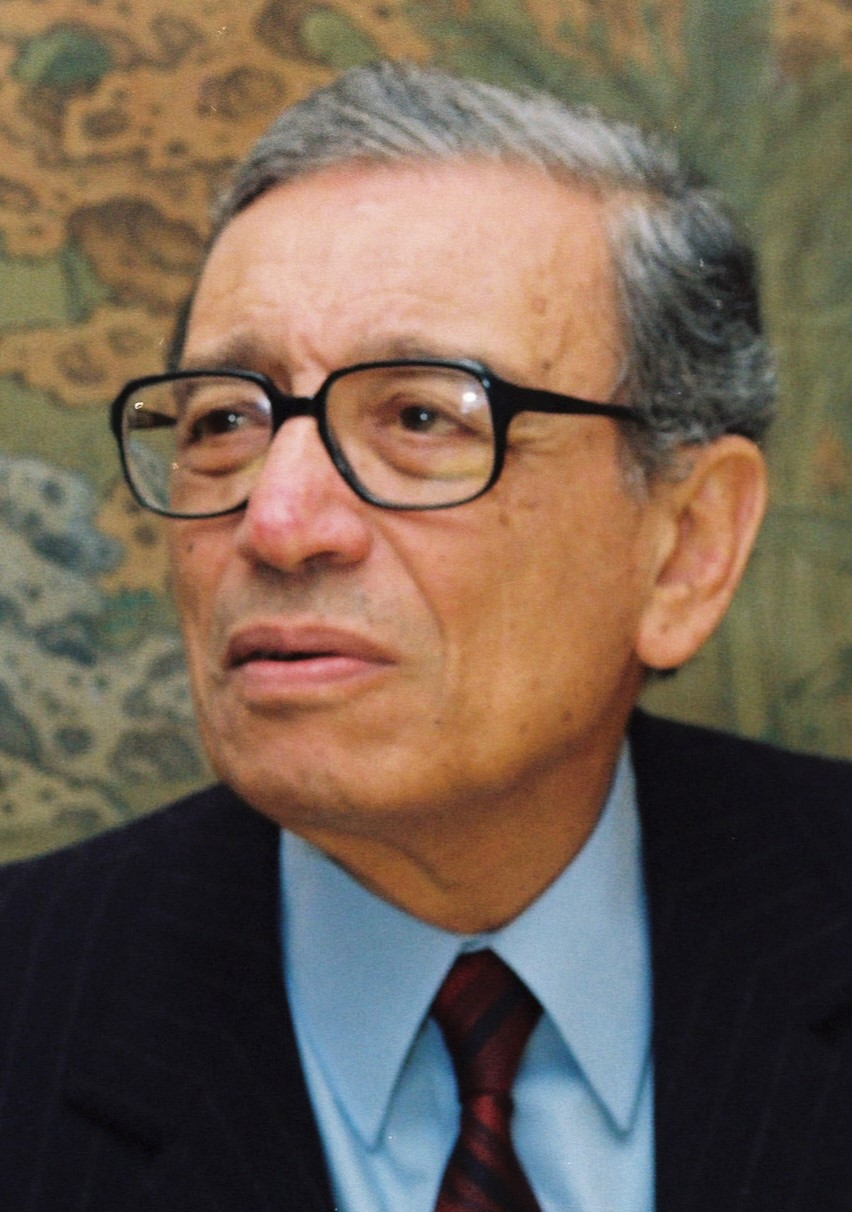

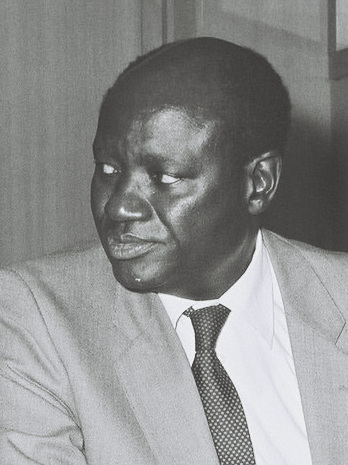

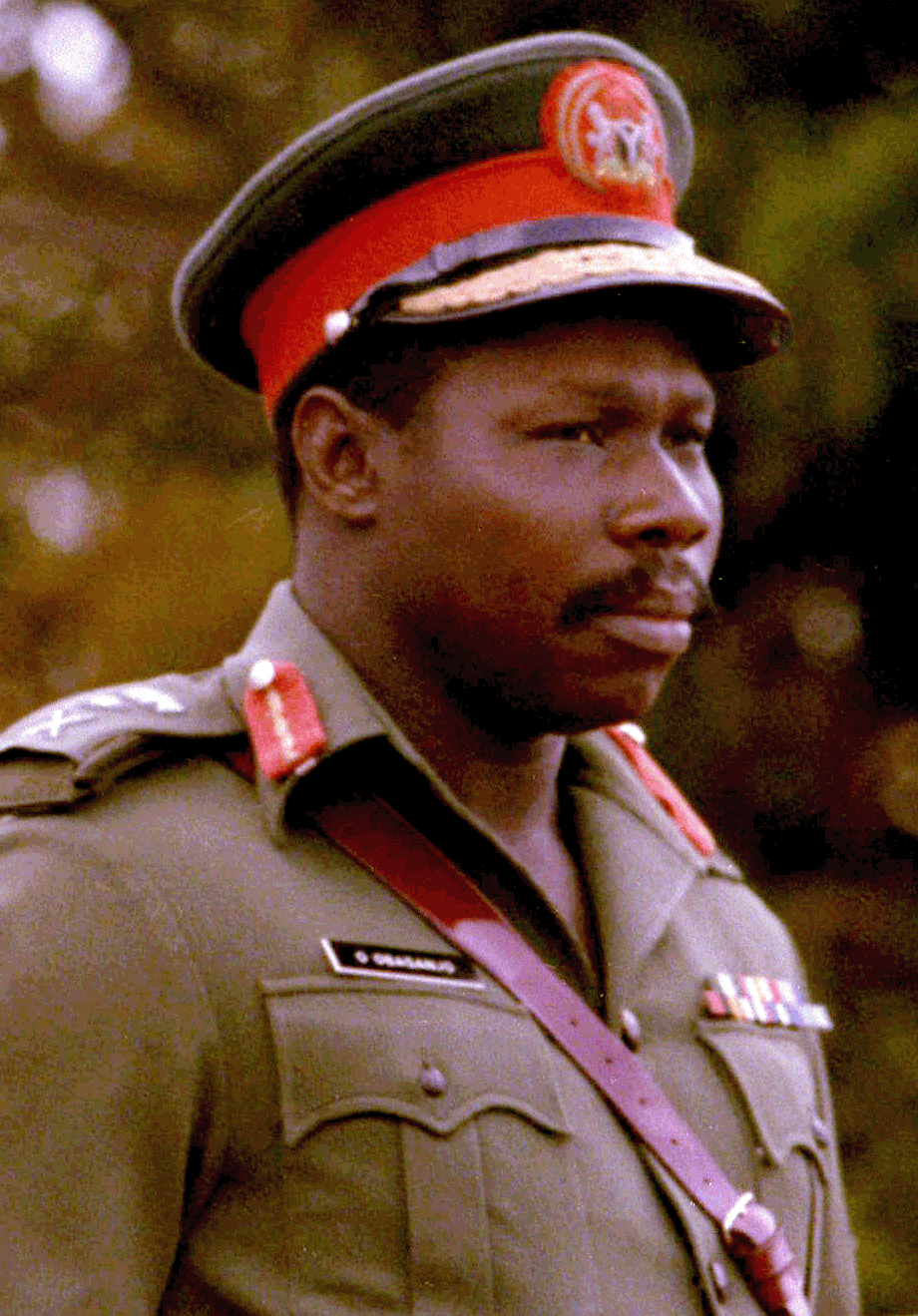
Candidate	Boutros Boutros-Ghali	Bernard Chidzero	Olusegun Obasanjo
Country	Egypt	Zimbabwe	Nigeria
Best vote	11 / 15	10 / 15	9 / 15
Vetoes	None	None	None
Round	6th straw poll 21 November 1991	2nd straw poll 21 October 1991	4th straw poll 11 November 1991
UN Secretary-General before election
Javier Pérez de Cuéllar
Elected UN Secretary-General
Boutros Boutros-Ghali

A United Nations Secretary-General selection was held in 1991 to replace Javier Pérez de Cuéllar, whose second term would end on 31 December 1991. Boutros Boutros-Ghali of Egypt was selected for a term ending on 31 December 1996, becoming the first Secretary-General from Africa.

The 1991 selection took place at a time of expectations for a "new world order," in which the United Nations would no longer be paralyzed by the superpower conflict of the Cold War. The expectations appeared to be fulfilled when the 1991 selection became the smoothest open selection in decades. No vetoes were cast against any of the African candidates on the ballot in 1991, in sharp contrast to the deadlocked 1981 selection and 1971 selection. For the first time, the straw polling procedure was used from the first round of voting, establishing the innovation first tried in 1981 as the standard procedure for future selections. The 1991 selection also established the principle of regional rotation of the Secretary-Generalship, as the Third World countries voted as a bloc to deny the office to any non-African candidate.

== Background ==
Prior to 1991, there had never been a Secretary-General from Africa. In 1981, Salim Ahmed Salim of Tanzania received the most votes in the first round of voting, but he was vetoed by the United States. The selection then deadlocked as China vetoed Kurt Waldheim a record 16 times, while the United States vetoed or voted against Salim a total of 15 times. To break the impasse, Waldheim and Salim both suspended their candidacies, and Javier Pérez de Cuéllar was selected as the first Secretary-General from Latin America.

As Javier Pérez de Cuéllar's second term drew to a close in 1991, the campaign for an African Secretary-General got underway. The Organisation of African Unity promised that its member states would vote against any non-African candidates in the General Assembly. The Non-Aligned Movement also endorsed the six official candidates from Africa. Since the Non-Aligned Movement included a majority of the votes in the UN General Assembly, it could block any candidate recommended by the Security Council. China again declared its support for a Secretary-General from Africa. However, the other four permanent members of the Security Council rejected the principle of regional rotation. The Soviet Union and France even considered extending Pérez's term for a couple of years, but he decided to retire.

== Candidates ==
Six African candidates were nominated by the Organisation of African Unity. Two other Africans were nominated by their own countries. Non-African candidates were also nominated during the straw polling.

Official candidates
Image	Candidate	Position	Nominated by	Regional group
	(France) (Iran) (Switzerland) Prince Sadruddin Aga Khan	Head of UN relief operations in Iraq	Unknown	Asian Group, Western European and Others Group
	(Egypt) Boutros Boutros-Ghali	Former Minister of Foreign Affairs (Egypt)	Organisation of African Unity	African Group
	(Netherlands) Hans van den Broek	Foreign Minister of the Netherlands	Unknown	Western European and Others Group
	(Norway) Gro Harlem Brundtland	Prime Minister of Norway	Unknown	Western European and Others Group
	(Zimbabwe) Bernard Chidzero	Chairman of the Development Committee of the World Bank	Organisation of African Unity	African Group
	(Ghana) Kenneth Dadzie	Secretary-General of the United Nations Conference on Trade and Development	Organisation of African Unity	African Group
	(Sierra Leone) James Jonah	Assistant Secretary-General for Special Political Questions	Organisation of African Unity	African Group
	(Cameroon) Michel Doo Kingue		Unknown member of Security Council	African Group
	(Philippines) Raul Manglapus	Foreign Minister of the Philippines	Unknown	Asian Group
	(Canada) Brian Mulroney	Prime Minister of Canada	United States	Western European and Others Group
	(Nigeria) Olusegun Obasanjo	Former Head of State of Nigeria	Organisation of African Unity	African Group
	(Gabon) Nguema Francois Owono	Former Minister of Culture of Gabon	Organisation of African Unity	African Group
	(Norway) Thorvald Stoltenberg	Minister of Foreign Affairs (Norway)	Unknown	Western European and Others Group
	(Poland) Krzysztof Skubiszewski	Foreign Minister of Poland	Unknown	Eastern European Group
	(Burundi) Msanze Terrence	Former Burundi Representative to the UN	Burundi	African Group

== Selection ==
The last two open selections in 1971 and 1981 had turned into veto duels, as two of the permanent members each vetoed the other's preferred candidate over multiple rounds of voting. The deadlocked 1981 selection had finally been resolved by turning to straw polls to gauge the level of support for candidates. Instead of voting openly in closed session, members of the Security Council voted anonymously using a secret ballot. After a likely winner had been identified, the permanent members voted on colored ballot paper, while rotating members voted on white paper. Since the colored ballots would reveal the existence of a veto but not the identity of the vetoing member, the likelihood of a veto duel was reduced.

The 1991 selection adopted the 1981 procedure from the start, setting a precedent for future selections. The Security Council held six rounds of straw polling over a six-week period. The straw poll of 10 October 1991 was a partial poll. The second poll took place on 21 October 1991 and featured all nine candidates on the ballot. Boutros Boutros-Ghali of Egypt and Bernard Chidzero of Zimbabwe led the straw poll with 10 votes each. Hans van den Broek of the Netherlands was the leading non-African candidate with 8 votes, one short of the number required for selection.

The third straw poll of 25 October 1991 was again won by Boutros-Ghali and Chidzero. All of the non-African candidates received at least seven 'discouraged' votes, corresponding to the number of Third World countries with rotating seats on the Security Council. However, the Third World countries did not vote for all the African candidates, some of whom received fewer than seven votes. Canadian Prime Minister Brian Mulroney also dropped out of the race, as he was facing the possible secession of Quebec from Canada.

The fourth straw poll was held on 11 November 1991. A crack opened in the Third World voting bloc, as Hans van den Broek received only six 'discouraged' votes.

The fifth straw poll on 12 November 1991 switched to blue ballot papers for the permanent members so that vetoes could be revealed. Chidzero placed first in the poll, and neither candidate received any vetoes. No vetoes were cast against any of the African candidates on the ballot, but all of the non-Africans were vetoed.

The sixth straw poll on 21 November 1991 revealed a clear winner. Boutros-Ghali was selected by a vote of 11-0-4. Chidzero came in second with a vote of 7-2-6. France and Belgium convinced four of Chidzero's supporters to stop voting for him, stoked by fears that the United States was trying to delay the selection so that a compromise candidate could emerge, while Boutros-Ghali and Chidzero cancelled each other out.

After the final straw poll, the United Nations Security Council voted unanimously to recommend Boutros Boutros-Ghali. The General Assembly appointed Boutros-Ghali by acclamation to be Secretary-General of the United Nations for a term ending on 31 December 1996.

United Nations Secretary-General straw poll results, 1991
Candidate	21 October			25 October			11 November			12 November			21 November		
Candidate	E	D	N	E	D	N	E	D	N	E	D	N	E	D	N
(France) (Iran) (Switzerland) Prince Sadruddin Aga Khan				5						4	8 (0P)	3	4	7	4
(Egypt) Boutros Boutros-Ghali	10			9			11	1	3	10	2 (0P)	3	11	0	4
(Netherlands) Hans van den Broek	8			5			5	6	4		? (P)		5	7	3
(Norway) Gro Harlem Brundtland				2							? (P)		1	8	6
(Zimbabwe) Bernard Chidzero	10			9			10	2	3	11	1 (0P)	3	7	2	6
(Ghana) Kenneth Dadzie	7			5									6	4	5
(Sierra Leone) James Jonah				6									5	5	5
(Cameroon) Michel Doo Kingue				5									6	4	5
(Philippines) Raul Manglapus				3							? (P)				
(Canada) Brian Mulroney				5			Withdrawn								
(Nigeria) Olusegun Obasanjo				7			9	4	2						
(Gabon) Nguema Francois Owono				6									3	3	9
(Norway) Thorvald Stoltenberg				2									2	9	4
(Poland) Krzysztof Skubiszewski	Not yet nominated			Not on ballot									2	8	5

== 1996 selection ==
Boutros-Ghali ran unopposed in 1996 for a second term, receiving votes from 14 of the 15 members of the Security Council. However, he was vetoed by the United States due to political fallout from the Battle of Mogadishu. After the other Security Council members failed to persuade the United States to change its position, the 1996 selection was thrown open to other candidates. Boutros-Ghali became the only Secretary-General to be denied a second term.
