= 1976 United Nations Secretary-General selection =

Reappointment of Kurt Waldheim

- 7 December 1976
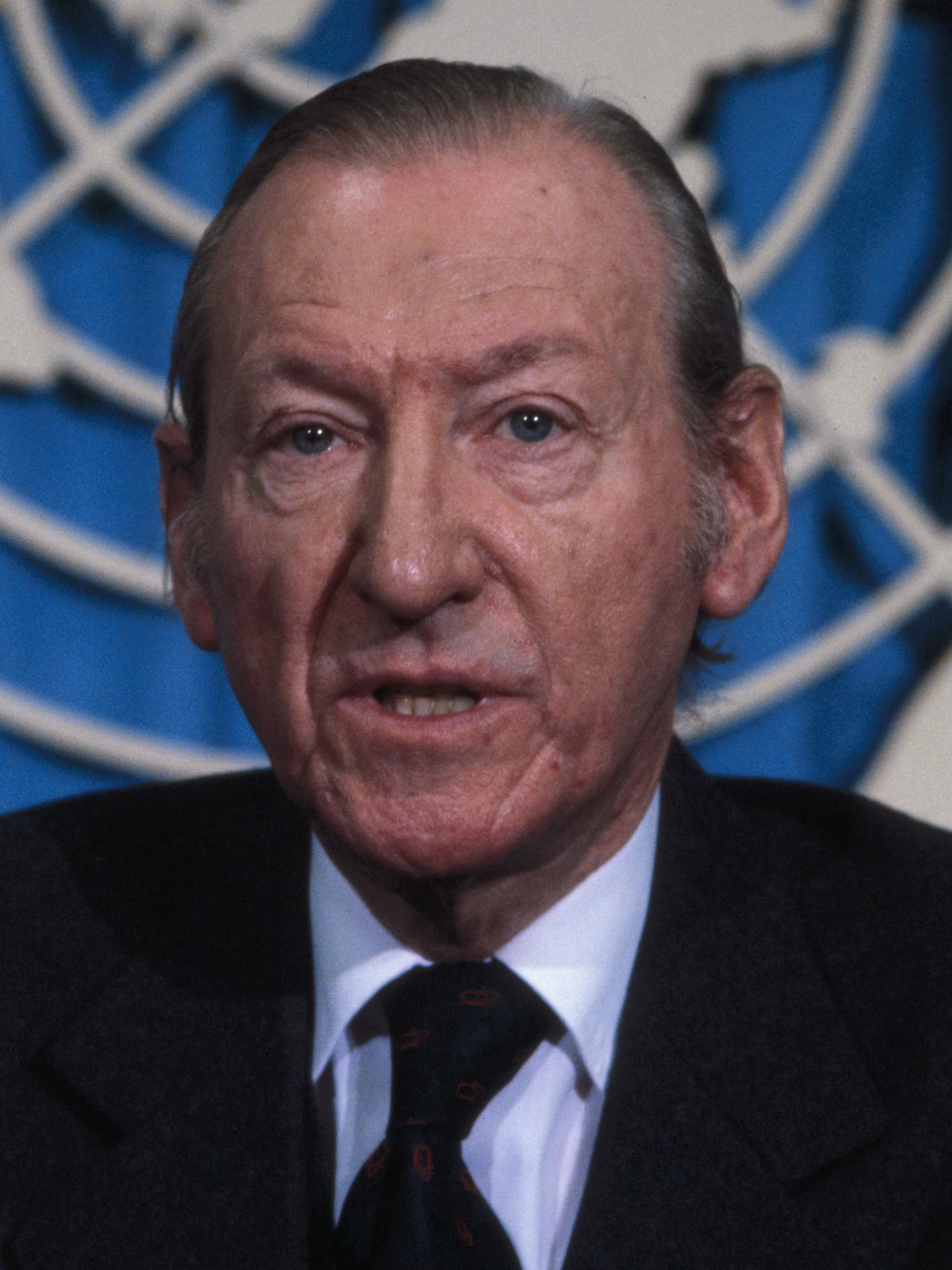

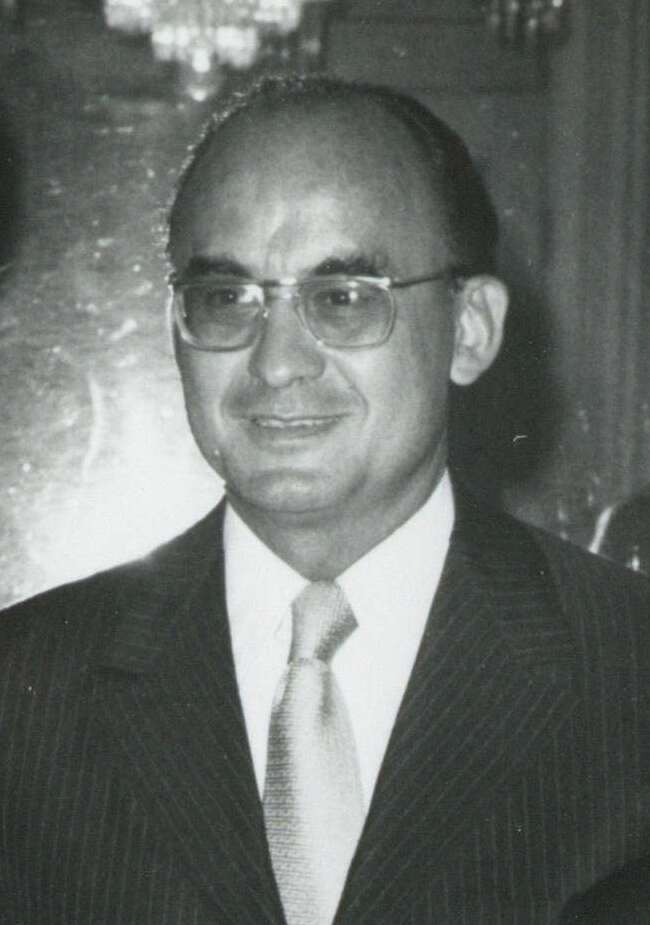
Candidate	Kurt Waldheim	Luis Echeverría
Country	Austria	Mexico
Vote	14 / 15	3 / 15
Vetoes	None	(Soviet Union)
Round	2nd round	2nd round
UN Secretary-General before election
Kurt Waldheim
Elected UN Secretary-General
Kurt Waldheim

A United Nations Secretary-General selection was held in 1976 at the end of Kurt Waldheim's first term. After a single symbolic veto from China to show its support for a Secretary-General from the Third World, Waldheim easily defeated Luis Echeverría Álvarez in the balloting. The Security Council re-selected Kurt Waldheim as Secretary General for another five-year term beginning 1 January 1977.

== Background ==
The Secretary-General of the United Nations is appointed by the General Assembly on the recommendation of the Security Council. Therefore, candidates for the office can be vetoed by any of the permanent members.

As the end of Kurt Waldheim's first term approached, China asked several Third World countries to nominate a competing candidate. The Chinese expressed their dissatisfaction that a European would lead the United Nations, which had a Third World majority in its membership. Six people expressed interest in the job, but none of them seemed likely to defeat Waldheim.

== Candidates ==
On 11 October 1976, Kurt Waldheim announced that he was running for re-selection. Although Waldheim had been opposed by three permanent members in the 1971 selection, Waldheim now enjoyed the support of both superpowers. One Asian diplomat explained, "The big powers all want a colorless administrator who does what he is told, and doesn't think he is Jesus Christ."

Expecting Waldheim to run unopposed, the Security Council prepared for an early vote. However, China and other Third World countries delayed the vote until December to give a chance for other candidates to step forward. Nevertheless, Chinese Foreign Minister Qiao Guanhua indicated that his country would not prevent Waldheim from being re-selected. Waldheim even received the support of the Organisation of African Unity.

On 18 October 1976, outgoing Mexican President Luis Echeverría Álvarez announced his candidacy for the Secretary-Generalship. From his first year in office, Echeverría had criticized the United States and backed the aspirations of the Third World, increasing Mexico's diplomatic presence by establishing diplomatic relations with 62 additional countries. Echeverría maintained a high public profile until the end of his term, contrary to the usual Mexican practice of stepping back to pave the way for his chosen successor, José López Portillo. Cynics claimed that Echeverría was courting Third World support so that he could become U.N. Secretary-General after leaving the Mexican Presidency. López Portillo's aides expressed their hope that Echeverría could become Secretary-General so that he would be out of the country for most of López Portillo's term.

On 15 November 1976, Hamilton Shirley Amerasinghe of Sri Lanka announced that he would be willing to serve as Secretary-General if the Security Council voted for him unanimously. However, he would not put his name on the ballot alongside the two existing candidates. This maneuver would place him in contention as a compromise candidate in case the Security Council deadlocked between Waldheim and Echeverría. Amerasinghe was then the President of the General Assembly.

== Voting ==
On 7 December 1976, the Security Council met to vote on the recommendation of a Secretary-General. In the first round, Waldheim easily outpolled Echeverría. China voted for Echeverría and cast a symbolic veto against Waldheim to demonstrate its support for a Third World candidate. The Soviet Union voted against Echeverría, and the other three permanent members abstained.

The Security Council immediately conducted a second round of voting. China dropped its veto and voted for Waldheim, giving him a winning tally of 14-0-1. Echeverría received only 3 votes in favor. As a result, Kurt Waldheim was selected Secretary-General for a second five-year term beginning on 1 January 1977.
