= 2016 United Nations Secretary-General selection =

Selection of António Guterres

- 21 July 2016 – 5 October 2016
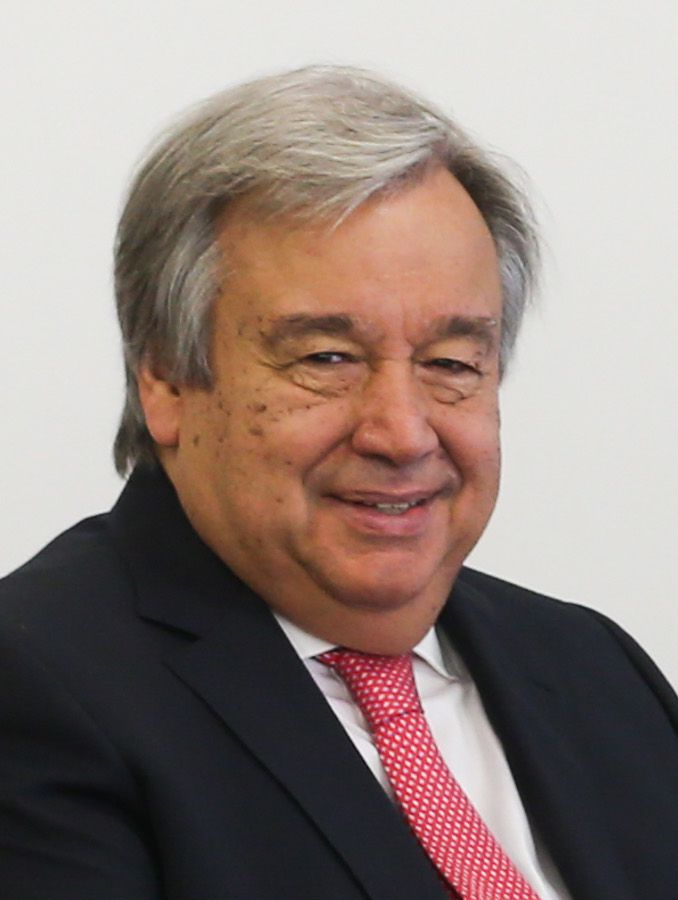

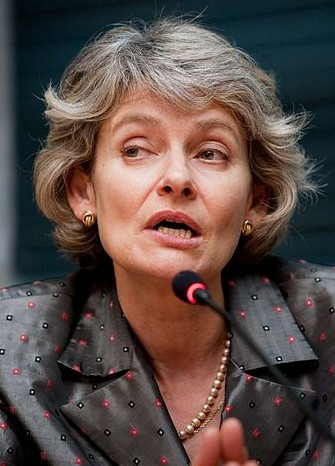

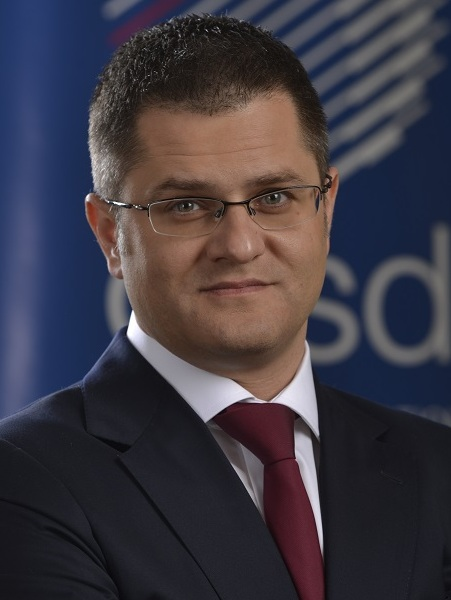

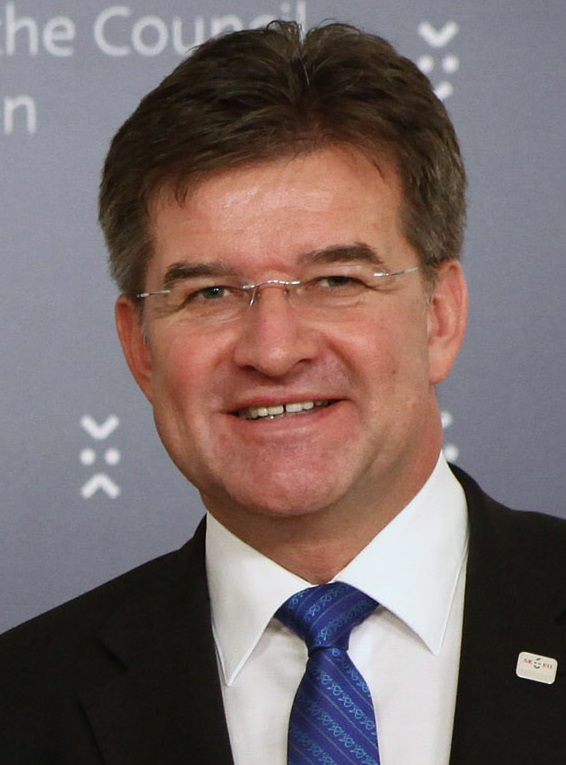

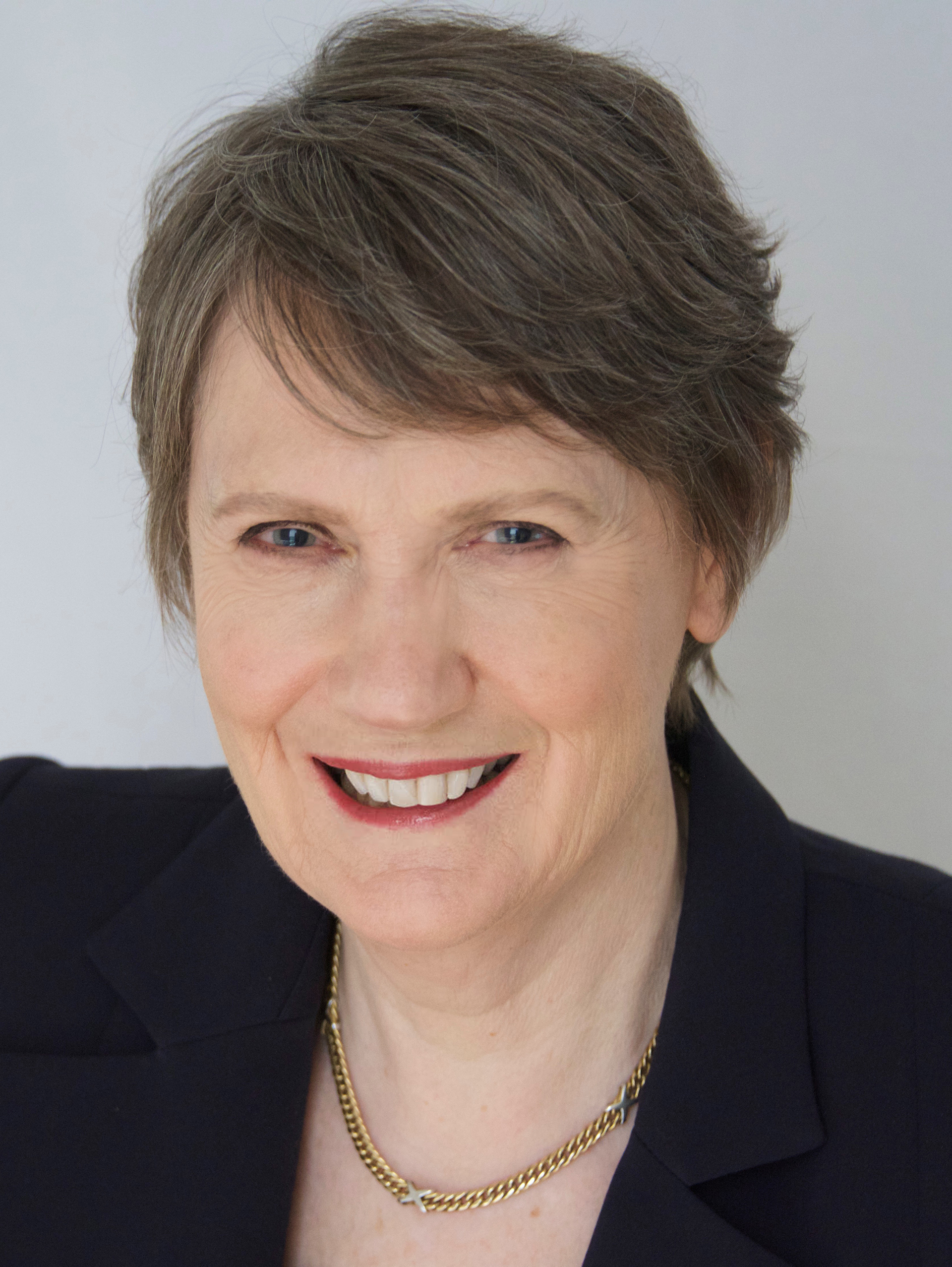
Nominee	António Guterres	Irina Bokova	Vuk Jeremić
Country	Portugal	Bulgaria	Serbia
Votes to encourage	13 / 15	7 / 15	7 / 15
P5 votes to discourage	0 / 5	2 / 5	3 / 5
Nominee	Miroslav Lajčák	Helen Clark
Country	Slovakia	New Zealand
Votes to encourage	7 / 15	6 / 15
P5 votes to discourage	2 / 5	3 / 5
Secretary-General before election
Ban Ki-moon
Elected Secretary-General
António Guterres

A United Nations secretary-general selection was held in October 2016 to choose the ninth secretary-general of the United Nations to succeed Ban Ki-moon from 1 January 2017. Six straw polls were held in the Security Council from 21 July 2016 to 5 October 2016. António Guterres of Portugal led the polling in every round, finishing the last round with 13 'encourage' votes, 0 'discourage' votes, and 2 abstentions. On 6 October 2016, the Security Council unanimously recommended Guterres to the General Assembly, which formally selected him by acclamation on 13 October 2016.

The 2016 selection was much more open than previous selections, with public nominations being sought and candidates participating in televised debates. Women and Eastern Europeans were favoured, as no woman had ever served as secretary-general, and the Eastern European Group was the only one of the UN Regional Groups never to have held the office.

== Background ==
Article 97 of the United Nations Charter, states "The Secretary-General shall be appointed by the General Assembly upon the recommendation of the Security Council". As a result, the selection is subject to the veto of any of the five permanent members of the Security Council. The Charter's minimal language has since been supplemented by other procedural rules and accepted practices.

Secretary-General Ban Ki-moon would be completing his second term on 31 December 2016, after which he would step down due to the informal two-term limit. Under the principle of regional rotation, candidates from Asia were ineligible to succeed Ban. The Eastern European Group was favored in the 2016 selection, as it was the only one of the United Nations Regional Groups never to have held the office of secretary-general, however tensions between Russia and the three Western European permanent members over the Russo-Ukrainian War raised the possibility of deadlock over an Eastern European nominee. As a result, the 2016 selection was the most diverse since 1981. Candidates from three regional groups were considered for the position: the Eastern European Group, the Western European and Others Group, and the Latin American and Caribbean Group.

No woman has ever been selected as secretary-general, and thus in December 2015, General Assembly President Mogens Lykketoft and Security Council President Samantha Power wrote a joint letter to all member states, encouraging them to nominate female candidates as well as men. Equality Now launched a campaign to elect a female Secretary-General with the title "Time for a Woman: United Nations—it’s been over 70 years, elect a female Secretary-General". Seven female candidates were nominated in 2016, more than in any previous selection.

== Reform ==
Historically, the process of selecting a secretary-general has been so secretive that it has been compared to a papal conclave. Diplomats advanced their own candidacies by lobbying members of the Security Council. Straw polls were taken by secret ballot in the Security Council consultation room, and the voting results were not revealed publicly. All reported information came in the form of leaks.

There has been criticism of the opacity of the process. Writing in Singapore's Straits Times, Simon Chesterman has argued that, for an organisation as important as the United Nations, "having its leader chosen by the lowest common denominator of what the P5 finds acceptable is not good enough". NGOs such as the 1 for 7 Billion campaign and The Elders also favored a more transparent process.

The Security Council and General Assembly took steps to make the selection process more transparent and open in 2016. General Assembly President Mogens Lykketoft and Security Council President Samantha Power sent out a joint letter soliciting candidates from member countries. Candidates also participated in televised debates, where they answered questions about their goals.

When the Security Council met to conduct its first straw poll, it voted in private, as it had done in all selections since 1981. The President of the General Assembly was officially informed that a straw poll had been taken, but the results of the poll were not disclosed. Lykketoft realized that "the outcome of this and future informal straw polls will not be communicated" and complained that it "does not live up to the expectations of the membership and the new standard of openness and transparency". All further straw polls were also taken in private.

== Candidates ==
At the time of the final straw poll on 5 October 2016, there were ten candidates for the post. Portugal's former Prime Minister and former United Nations High Commissioner for Refugees António Guterres led in all six straw polls. Deputy Speaker of the Croatian Parliament Vesna Pusić withdrew on 4 August after the first straw poll, in which she came in last position with 11 "discourage" votes, followed by the withdrawal of Montenegro's Foreign Affairs Minister Igor Lukšić on 24 August and the withdrawal of Christiana Figueres on 12 September. Kristalina Georgieva entered the race on 28 September; although the Prime Minister of Bulgaria nominated Kristalina Georgieva as its new sole candidate for the secretary-general's position, the decision to withdraw from the race can only be done by the candidates; therefore, Irina Bokova decided to continue in the race, leaving Bulgaria with two candidates.

=== Official candidates ===
Official candidates
Image	Name	Prior experience	Nominator	Nominated	Regional group	Endorsements
	Irina Bokova	Acting Minister of Foreign Affairs of Bulgaria (1996–1997); Director-General of UNESCO (2009–2017)	Bulgaria (Support withdrawn)	11 February 2016	Eastern European Group (EEG)	
	Helen Clark	Prime Minister of New Zealand (1999–2008); Administrator of the United Nations Development Programme (2009–2017)	New Zealand	5 April 2016	Western European and Others Group (WEOG)	
	Kristalina Georgieva	European Commissioner for International Cooperation, Humanitarian Aid and Crisis Response (2010–2014); European Commissioner for the Budget and Human Resources (2014–2016)	Bulgaria	28 September 2016	Eastern European Group (EEG)	
	Natalia Gherman	Minister of Foreign Affairs and European Integration of Moldova (2013–2016); Acting Prime Minister of Moldova (2015)	Moldova	19 February 2016	Eastern European Group (EEG)	
	António Guterres	Prime Minister of Portugal (1995–2002); United Nations High Commissioner for Refugees (2005–2015)	Portugal	29 February 2016	Western European and Others Group (WEOG)	Cape Verde; Angola; France; East Timor
	Vuk Jeremić	Minister of Foreign Affairs of Serbia (2007–2012); President of the United Nations General Assembly (2012–2013)	Serbia	12 April 2016	Eastern European Group (EEG)	
	Srgjan Kerim	Minister of Foreign Affairs of Macedonia (2000–2001); President of the United Nations General Assembly (2007–2008)	FYR Macedonia	30 December 2015	Eastern European Group (EEG)	
	Miroslav Lajčák	High Representative for Bosnia and Herzegovina (2007–2009); Minister of Foreign Affairs of Slovakia (2009–2010; 2012–2020)	Slovakia	25 May 2016	Eastern European Group (EEG)	
	Susana Malcorra	Undersecretary General of the United Nations for Field Support (2008–2012); Chef de Cabinet of the United Nations Secretariat (2012–2015); Minister of Foreign Affairs of Argentina (2015–2017)	Argentina	23 May 2016	Latin American and Caribbean Group (GRULAC)	
	Danilo Türk	Slovenian Ambassador to the United Nations (1991–2000); Assistant Secretary General of the United Nations for Political Affairs (2000–2005); President of Slovenia (2007–2012)	Slovenia	9 February 2016	Eastern European Group (EEG)	

=== Withdrawn candidates ===
Withdrawn candidates
Image	Name	Prior experience	Nominator	Nominated	Withdrawn	Regional group
	Vesna Pusić	Minister of Foreign and European Affairs of Croatia (2011–2016)	Croatia	14 January 2016	4 August 2016	Eastern European Group (EEG)
	Igor Lukšić	Prime Minister of Montenegro (2010–2012); Minister of Foreign Affairs of Montenegro (2012–2016)	Montenegro	15 January 2016	23 August 2016	Eastern European Group (EEG)
	Christiana Figueres	Executive Secretary of the United Nations Framework Convention on Climate Change (2010–2016)	Costa Rica	7 July 2016	12 September 2016	Latin American and Caribbean Group (GRULAC)

=== Speculation and candidates who failed to be nominated ===
From 2014 to 2015, prior to the selection, many other leading politicians, mainly from Eastern European and Latin American and Caribbean Group were also mentioned in the media as possible candidate, including János Áder, Michelle Bachelet, Alicia Bárcena, Dalia Grybauskaite, Rebeca Grynspan, María Ángela Holguín, Ján Kubiš, Dilma Rousseff or Boris Tadić, but some of them personally ruled out having such goals.

In July 2016, it was revealed that former Labor Prime Minister of Australia Kevin Rudd asked the Government of Australia (then a government of the Liberal/National Coalition) to nominate him for secretary-general in April 2016. At its meeting on 28 July, the Cabinet was divided on his suitability for the role and, on that basis, Prime Minister Malcolm Turnbull decided to decline the request the next day; since nomination by the Australian government was considered a necessary prerequisite for candidacy, Turnbull's decision essentially ended Rudd's campaign; Rudd later confirmed as much.

== Security Council straw polls ==
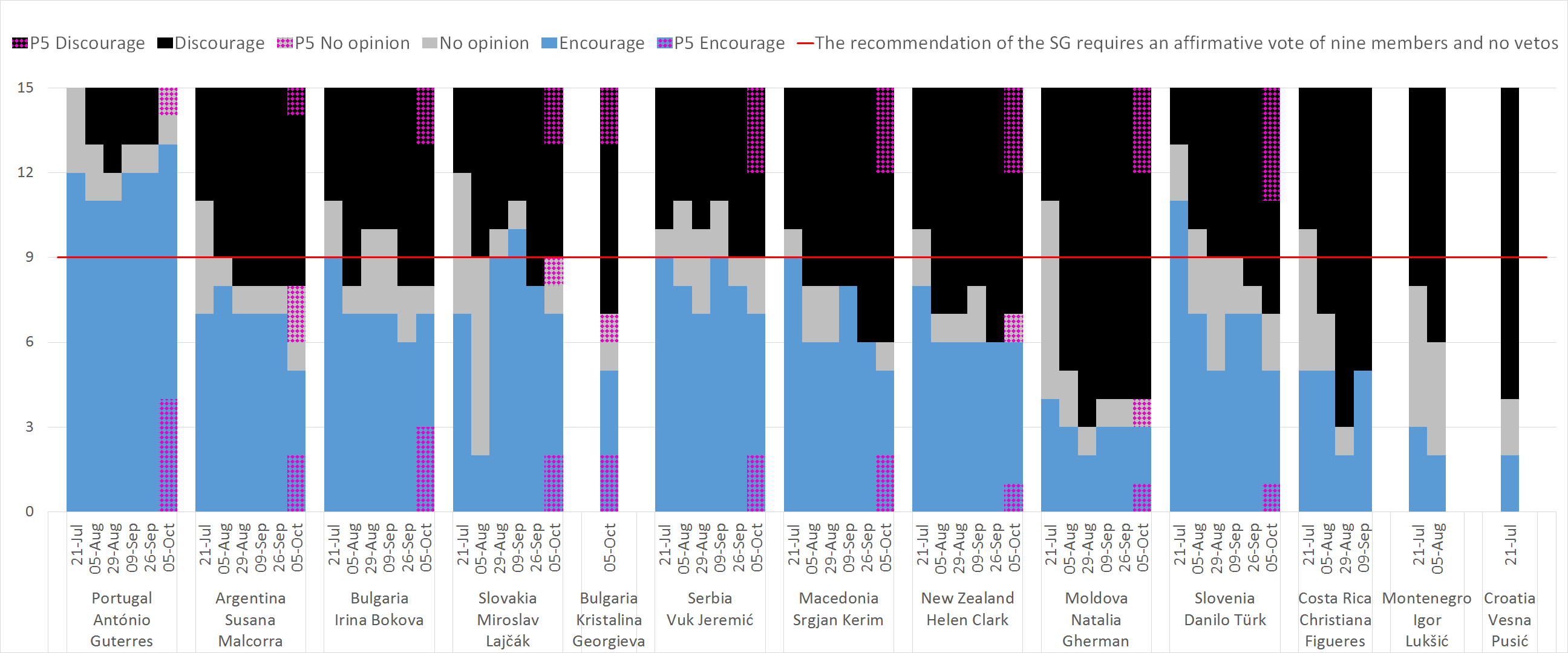
Results of all straw polls per candidate

The Security Council held a series of six straw polls in the consultation room. Security Council members were asked to indicate whether they "encouraged", "discouraged" or had "no opinion" regarding the candidates. The initial five straw polls took place on 21 July, 5 August, 29 August, 9 September, and 26 September.

During the sixth straw poll, the five permanent members voted on red-coloured ballots to reveal whether any of them intended to veto a candidate, while the rotating members voted on white ballots. Since António Guterres was the only candidate who received the necessary nine encouraged votes and had no discouraged votes from permanent members, Guterres was declared by the Security Council as the "clear favourite".

United Nations Secretary-General selection straw poll results
Candidate	21 July			5 August			29 August			9 September			26 September			5 October			Final Vote
Candidate	E	D	N	E	D	N	E	D	N	E	D	N	E	D	N	E	D	N	Final Vote
(Bulgaria) Irina Bokova	9	4	2	7	7	1	7	5	3	7	5	3	6	7	2	7 (3P)	7 (2P)	1	Withdrawn
(New Zealand) Helen Clark	8	5	2	6	8	1	6	8	1	6	7	2	6	9	0	6 (1P)	8 (3P)	1 (1P)	Withdrawn
(Costa Rica) Christiana Figueres	5	5	5	5	8	2	2	12	1	5	10	0	Withdrawn						
(Bulgaria) Kristalina Georgieva	Not yet nominated															5 (2P)	8 (2P)	2 (1P)	Withdrawn
(Moldova) Natalia Gherman	4	4	7	3	10	2	2	12	1	3	11	1	3	11	1	3 (1P)	11 (3P)	1 (1P)	Withdrawn
(Portugal) António Guterres	12	0	3	11	2	2	11	3	1	12	2	1	12	2	1	13 (4P)	0	2 (1P)	Acclaimed
(Serbia) Vuk Jeremić	9	5	1	8	4	3	7	5	3	9	4	2	8	6	1	7 (2P)	6 (3P)	2	Withdrawn
(North Macedonia) Srgjan Kerim	9	5	1	6	7	2	6	7	2	8	7	0	6	9	0	5 (2P)	9 (3P)	1	Withdrawn
(Slovakia) Miroslav Lajčák	7	3	5	2	6	7	9	5	1	10	4	1	8	7	0	7 (2P)	6 (2P)	2 (1P)	Withdrawn
(Montenegro) Igor Lukšić	3	7	5	2	9	4	Withdrawn												
(Argentina) Susana Malcorra	7	4	4	8	6	1	7	7	1	7	7	1	7	7	1	5 (2P)	7 (1P)	3 (2P)	Withdrawn
(Croatia) Vesna Pusić	2	11	2	Withdrawn															
(Slovenia) Danilo Türk	11	2	2	7	5	3	5	6	4	7	6	2	7	7	1	5 (1P)	8 (4P)	2	Withdrawn

Candidate received at least one "encouraged" from a veto-wielding P5 member
Candidate received at least one "discouraged" from a veto-wielding P5 member

== Official nomination and appointment ==
On 6 October 2016, the Security Council voted by acclamation to recommend António Guterres in Security Council Resolution 2311. On 13 October 2016, the seventy-first session of the United Nations General Assembly ratified the Security Council's choice by acclamation, formally appointing Guterres as the next Secretary-General for a five-year term beginning on 1 January 2017.
