= 1971 United Nations Secretary-General selection =

Selection of Kurt Waldheim

- 17 December 1971 – 21 December 1971
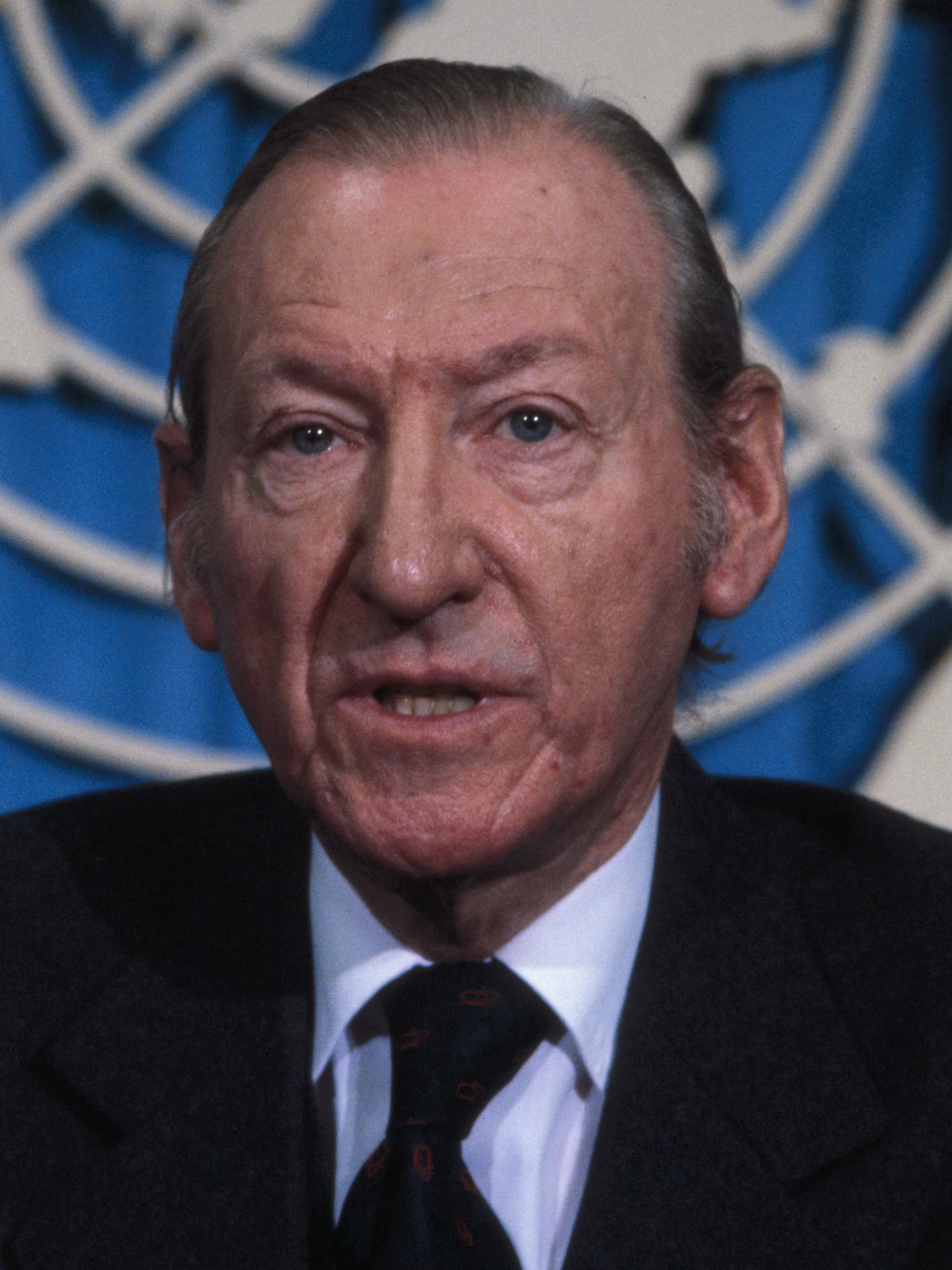

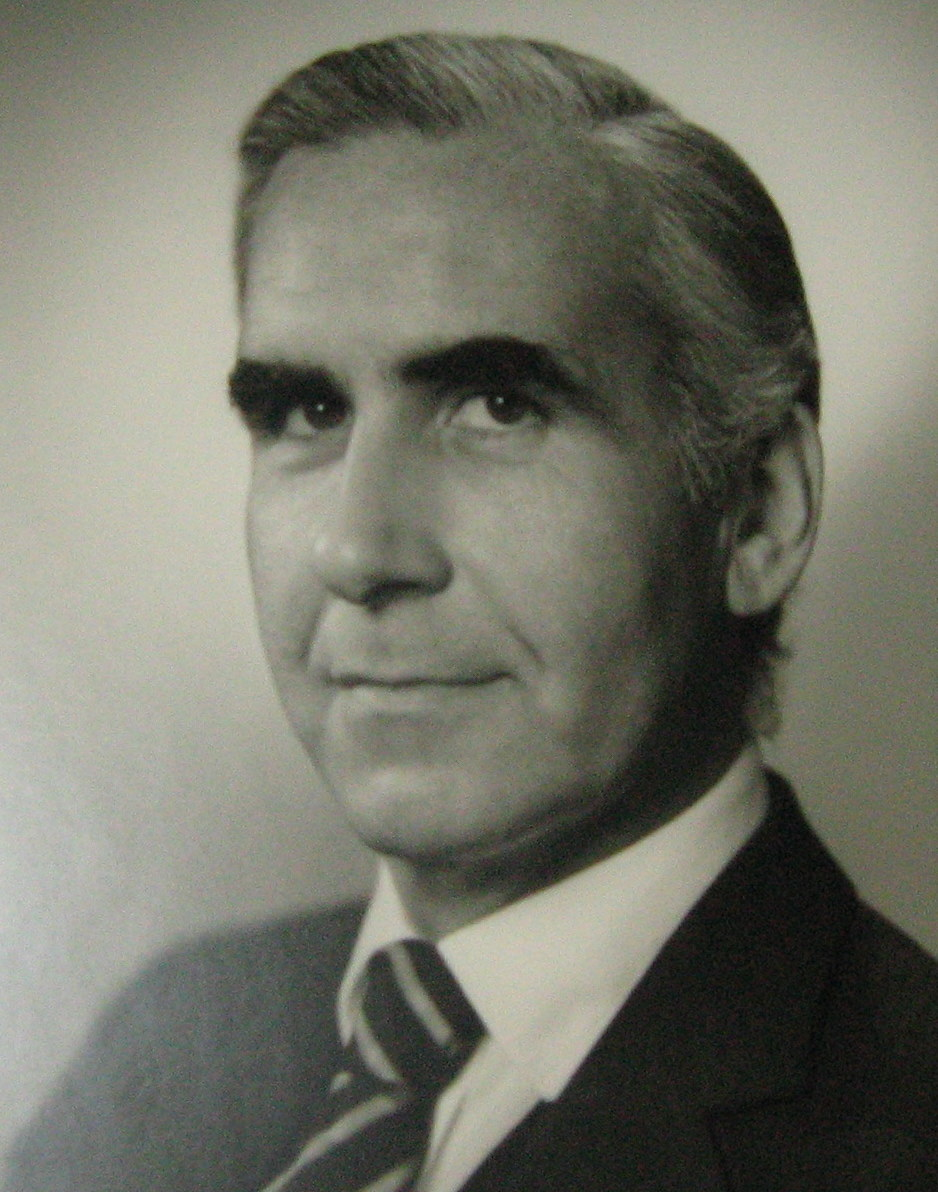

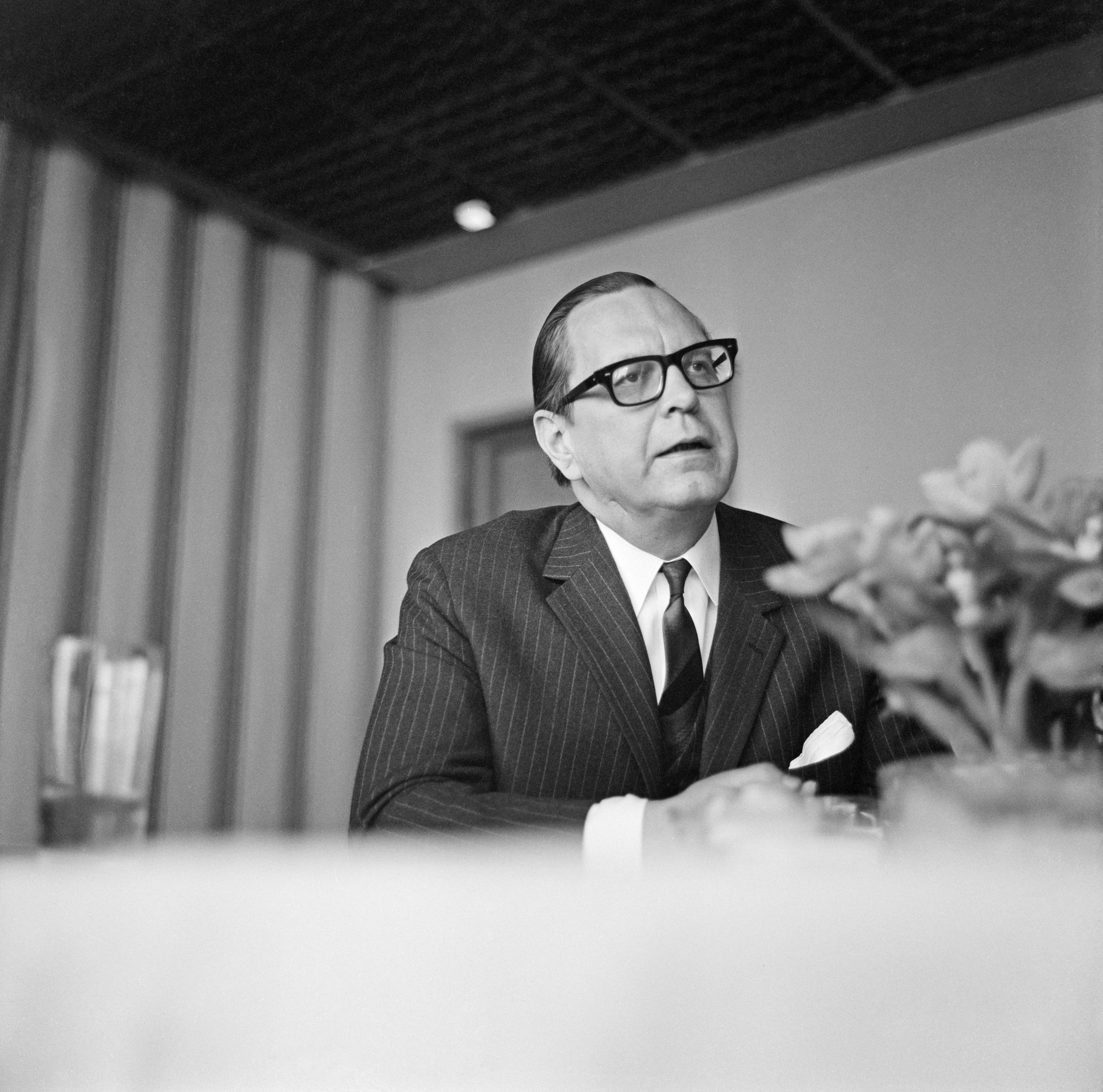
Candidate	Kurt Waldheim	Carlos Ortiz de Rozas	Max Jakobson
Country	Austria	Argentina	Finland
Best vote	11 / 15	12 / 15	9 / 15
Vetoes	None	(Soviet Union)	(Soviet Union)
Round	3rd round 21 December 1971	3rd round 21 December 1971	3rd round 21 December 1971
UN Secretary-General before election
U Thant
Elected UN Secretary-General
Kurt Waldheim

A United Nations Secretary-General selection was held in 1971 to succeed U Thant, who was stepping down after two full terms. Three candidates received enough votes in the Security Council to be selected Secretary-General: Carlos Ortiz de Rozas of Argentina, Kurt Waldheim of Austria, and Max Jakobson of Finland. However, all of the frontrunners were vetoed in the first two rounds of voting. In the third round, Waldheim accidentally escaped a triple-veto when three permanent members failed to coordinate their votes and all abstained. As a result, Kurt Waldheim was selected Secretary-General of the United Nations for a term starting 1 January 1972.

== Background ==
The Secretary-General of the United Nations is appointed by the General Assembly on the recommendation of the Security Council. Candidates for the office can be vetoed by any of the five permanent members. Members of NATO and the Warsaw Pact were not eligible for the job, as they would be vetoed by the opposing superpower. Only diplomats from neutral countries could expect to escape a veto.

On 18 January 1971, Secretary-General U Thant announced that he would not seek another term. Thant had been serving as Secretary-General since 1961, when his predecessor Dag Hammarskjöld died in a plane crash. The Soviet Union, France, and Third World countries wanted to draft Thant for at least one more year in office, as he had been strongly opposed to apartheid and colonialism. However, Thant declared that his decision was "final and categorical," and he would not serve "even for two months" past the end of his term. The United States also opposed another term for Thant, citing his administrative shortcomings and his opposition to the Vietnam War.

== Candidates ==
Official candidates
Image	Candidate	Position	Nominated by	Regional group	Notes
	Prince Sadruddin Aga Khan	United Nations High Commissioner for Refugees	United States	Asian Group	Triple-citizen of France, Iran, and Switzerland, but nominated by United States.
	Hamilton Shirley Amerasinghe	Permanent Representative of Ceylon to the U.N.	Ceylon	Asian Group	
	Felipe Herrera	President of Inter-American Development Bank (1960–1970)	Chile	Latin American Group	
	Gunnar Jarring	U.N. Special Representative in the Middle East (1967–1971), Ambassador of Sweden to the Soviet Union	Soviet Union	Western European and Others Group	Citizen of Sweden, but nominated by Soviet Union as a Scandinavian alternative to Jakobson. Declared that he would not run for the office, but would serve if selected unanimously by the Security Council.
	Max Jakobson	Permanent Representative of Finland to the U.N.	Finland	Western European and Others Group	
	Endelkachew Makonnen	Minister of Communications of Ethiopia, Former Permanent Representative of Ethiopia to the U.N.	Ethiopia	African Group	
	Kurt Waldheim	Chair of the UN Committee on the Peaceful Uses of Outer Space	Austria	Western European and Others Group	

== Campaign ==
Max Jakobson of Finland entered the race on 20 January 1971. Jakobson had taken a strongly anti-colonial stance, winning him the support of the newly independent countries of Africa. He was supported by the United States and the United Kingdom, while France was troubled only by his inability to speak French. Jakobson had been praised privately by Arab diplomats for his fairness in chairing a committee on Palestinian refugees. However, the Arab countries and the Soviet Union expressed their belief that he would be subject to Zionist pressure because of his Jewish ancestry. Western diplomats believed that the Soviet Union actually opposed Jakobson because of his views on Finnish-Soviet relations, but Soviet diplomat Victor Israelyan revealed decades later that the Soviet Union vetoed Jakobson on behalf of the Arabs.

Kurt Waldheim of Austria was long rumored to be interested in the position of Secretary-General. After losing the Austrian presidential election to the incumbent Franz Jonas in April 1971, Waldheim turned his efforts to the U.N. Secretary-Generalship. On 16 June 1971, Waldheim called on the U.S. Department of State to make it known that he would be available for the position. Unlike Jakobson, Waldheim spoke French fluently and could count on the French vote. Waldheim also counted on Soviet support in case Jakobson's candidacy began to falter. The United States was unenthusiastic about Waldheim, as his "greatest asset" and "greatest liability" was that he had no enemies and wouldn't do anything to make enemies.

Gunnar Jarring of Sweden was a dark-horse candidate. Although Jakobson won Swedish endorsement as the Scandinavian candidate, the Soviet Union floated Jarring's name as a Scandinavian alternative.

Felipe Herrera of Chile picked up support late in the race as Latin American countries united behind his candidacy. Although Herrera had been nominated by the leftist Allende government, even Argentina's military junta committed to support him as the Latin American candidate. Herrera was well-regarded in Latin America as the former head of the Inter-American Development Bank, where he was known as a "developmentalist". However, the United States opposed any candidate nominated by the Allende government and felt that Herrera was "a poor manager to boot". On 20 October 1971, the United States instructed its ambassadors to tell Latin American Foreign Ministers, "in deep confidence," that the U.S. could not support a Chilean candidate. On 5 November 1971, George Bush met with Herrera and revealed that the United States would not support his candidacy.

=== Consultations of the permanent members ===
In past selections, the two superpowers had controlled the selection of the next Secretary-General. However, the 1971 selection was complicated by the uncertain status of the Chinese seat in the United Nations. On 20 November 1970, a majority of the General Assembly had voted to expel the Republic of China from the United Nations and replace it with the People's Republic of China. Although the vote had fallen short of the two-thirds required to take effect, supporters of Communist China were confident of victory in 1971. On 25 October 1971, two-thirds of the General Assembly voted to expel Nationalist China from the United Nations. The Chinese veto was placed in the hands of Communist China, a Third World country that was not aligned with either the United States or the Soviet Union.

The United States and the Soviet Union avoided discussing the Secretary-Generalship as they waited to see what the Chinese position would be. From early in the race, Max Jakobson had presented himself as the only candidate who was acceptable to the People's Republic of China. The Chinese were publicly noncommittal on the selection of a Secretary-General. However, they revealed to the other permanent members that their top choices were Herrera and Jakobson.

On 6 December 1971, the permanent members finally began meeting to discuss the selection of a Secretary-General. Despite Thant's "final and unequivocal" decision to step down, the Soviet Union expressed its desire to draft Thant for at least a few months to deal with the Indo-Pakistani War of 1971. Although Thant had recently been treated at Leroy Hospital for a bleeding ulcer, Soviet ambassador Yakov Malik said that Thant could not be expected to be "100 percent fit as an astronaut" and needed two weeks of vacation. The U.S. and British ambassadors argued that Thant should be allowed to step down, and U.S. Secretary of State William P. Rogers instructed Bush to veto Thant if his name appeared on the ballot.

== Voting ==
On 17 December 1971, the Security Council met in closed session to vote on the selection of a Secretary-General. As usual, the vote was taken by secret ballot. The permanent members voted on red ballots and the rotating members voted on white ballots. Although Jakobson had been presumed the frontrunner for the past 11 months, Kurt Waldheim was the only candidate to win the required 9-vote majority. However, Waldheim was vetoed by China and the United Kingdom. Felipe Herrera of Chile was kept on the ballot at Chinese and Soviet insistence. Every candidate was vetoed except Gunnar Jarring of Sweden, who became the presumed frontrunner.

On 20 December 1971, Waldheim continued to lead with 11 votes but was vetoed by China. Carlos Ortiz de Rozas arrived on the ballot with a surprisingly-strong 10 votes but was vetoed by the Soviet Union. Jakobson received the required minimum of 9 votes but was vetoed by the Soviet Union. Jarring managed only 7 votes. Every candidate received at least one negative vote from a permanent member, and some candidates even received four. Diplomats expected the veto duel to continue in the third round of voting.

=== Accidental Waldheim victory ===
On 21 December 1971, the U.S. and British delegations received instructions from their governments to prevent Kurt Waldheim from being selected in that day's voting. Since both countries had voted in favor of Waldheim on 20 December 1971, they decided to abstain if they were "reasonably certain" that the Chinese would veto Waldheim again. U.S. ambassador George H. W. Bush asked British ambassador Colin Crowe to talk to the Chinese, but Crowe thought that it would "only arouse suspicion". Instead, they asked the Norwegian and Finnish ambassadors how the Chinese would vote, receiving assurances that the Chinese would continue to veto Waldheim. Bush also talked to Jakobson, who said that the Chinese would veto Waldheim "all the way through".

In the third round of voting, Carlos Ortiz de Rozas moved into the lead with 12 votes but was vetoed by the Soviet Union. Waldheim came in second with 11 votes but received no vetoes. To the surprise of the Americans and British, the Chinese abstained instead of vetoing Waldheim. As a result, Kurt Waldheim was successfully recommended as Secretary-General of the United Nations for a term beginning on 1 January 1972.

As usual, the voting rounds and recommendation were held in private meetings, and the recommendation after the last round was by unanimous acclamation (United Nations Security Council Resolution 306).

=== Voting results ===
United Nations Secretary-General selection results, 1971
Candidate	17 December			
Candidate	Round 1			
Candidate	For	Against	Abstain	Vetoes
(France) (Iran) (Switzerland) Prince Sadruddin Aga Khan	3			Yes (unknown)
(Dominion of Ceylon) Hamilton Shirley Amerasinghe	5			Yes (unknown)
(Chile) Felipe Herrera	7	4	4	(United States)
(Sweden) Gunnar Jarring	7	5	3	None
(Finland) Max Jakobson	8	5	2	Yes (unknown)
(Ethiopia) Endelkachew Makonnen	4			Yes (unknown)
(Austria) Kurt Waldheim	10	3	2	(China) (United Kingdom)

United Nations Secretary-General selection results, 1971
Candidate	20 December				21 December			
Candidate	Round 2				Round 3			
Candidate	For	Against	Abstain	Vetoes	For	Against	Abstain	Vetoes
(Dominion of Ceylon) Hamilton Shirley Amerasinghe	4	6	5	Yes	Removed from ballot			
(Niger) Issoufou Saidou-Djermakoye	5	8	2	Yes	Removed from ballot			
(Chile) Felipe Herrera	7	6	2	Yes				
(Sweden) Gunnar Jarring	7	4	4	(China) + 1 (unknown)				
(Finland) Max Jakobson	9	5	1	(Soviet Union)	9	5	1	(Soviet Union)
(Argentina) Carlos Ortiz de Rozas	10	3	2	(Soviet Union)	12	3	0	(Soviet Union)
(Iran) Abdul Majid Rahmena	3	8	4	Yes	Removed from ballot			
(Guyana) Shridath Ramphal	3	7	5	Yes	Removed from ballot			
(Chile) Gabriel Valdés	7	5	3	Yes				
(Austria) Kurt Waldheim	11	2	2	(China)	11	1	3	None

== Conclusions ==
The Austrian campaign for Kurt Waldheim was successful even though he was "regarded as lacking sufficient stature and drive to be taken seriously". French ambassador Jacques Kosciusco-Morizet said that it was "not enough to have a candidate against whom there is no objection. A candidate for SYG [Secretary-General] should also have something in his favor." British ambassador Colin Crowe disagreed that Waldheim was even "non-objectionable". However, Waldheim received strong diplomatic backing from Austria's Social Democratic government under Bruno Kreisky, even though Waldheim was from the opposition Austrian People's Party. Waldheim was also favored by the Soviet Union. During a dinner at Waldheim's house, Soviet ambassador Yakov Malik proposed a toast to the host, "May all your wishes come true."

The Finnish campaign for Max Jakobson was marked by a number of missteps. Although Finland sought the support of the other Scandinavian countries, Swedish diplomat Gunnar Jarring was also nominated and became the only candidate to receive no vetoes in the first round. Jakobson was Jewish and drew opposition from the Arab countries, but Jarring had been the U.N. Special Representative in the Middle East and tried to arrange an Israeli withdrawal from the Sinai. Jakobson's views on Finnish neutrality also drew Soviet opposition, while Jarring was Sweden's ambassador to the Soviet Union. Finland pressured Sweden to withdraw Jarring from the race, but Swedish neutrality made it difficult to withdraw a candidate who was supported by one of the superpowers.

Waldheim was selected because of a miscalculation by the U.S. and U.K. delegations. On 20 December 1971, George Bush received contradictory information about the Chinese position on Waldheim. The Finnish and Norwegian delegations claimed that China would "veto Waldheim to the bitter end". However, the Austrian and Italian delegations claimed that the Chinese would drop their veto if their preferred candidate could not win. Bush felt that Norwegian ambassador Ole Ålgård had "proven to be most accurate forecaster of PRC positions". The next day, the U.S. and U.K. acted on this belief by abstaining on Waldheim instead of vetoing him, discovering to their surprise that China also abstained.

After the surprise victory of Kurt Waldheim, the British and Italian delegations criticized Finnish "overconfidence" that led to "inaccurate Finnish statements concerning positions of alleged supporters". In addition to getting the Chinese position wrong, Finland had also claimed that the Soviet Union would not veto Jakobson, and Sweden would withdraw Jarring. Finland also claimed that the Soviet Union would not veto their candidate and said that the U.S. and U.K. had "let them down" by not vetoing Waldheim. The French were "furious" when the Finns accused them of vetoing Jakobson in the first round, as they had actually abstained.
