= United Nations Security Council Resolution 306 =

UN Security Council Resolution 306
- Date: 21 December 1971
- Meeting no.: 1,620
- Code: S/RES/306 (Document)
- Subject: Recommendation regarding the appointment of the Secretary-General
- Voting summary: 15 voted for; None voted against; None abstained
- Result: Adopted

Security Council composition
- Permanent members: China; France; Soviet Union; United Kingdom; United States
- Non-permanent members: Argentina; Belgium; Burundi; Italy; Japan; Nicaragua; Poland; Sierra Leone; Somalia; Syria

United Nations Security Council Resolution 306 was adopted on December 21, 1971. After considering the recommendation of the appointment of the Secretary-General of the United Nations, the Council recommended to the General Assembly that Kurt Waldheim be appointed for a five-year term.

The resolution was adopted unanimously at a private meeting.

== See also ==
- 1971 United Nations Secretary-General selection
- List of United Nations Security Council Resolutions 301 to 400 (1971–1976)
