= Felipe Herrera =

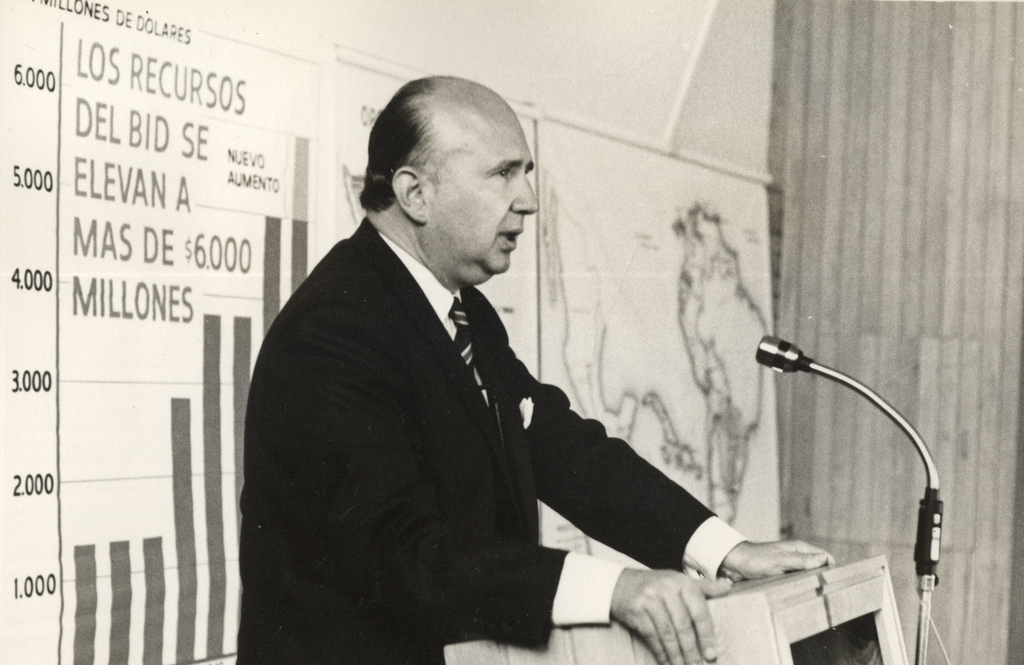
Felipe Herrera

Felipe Herrera Lane (17 June 1922 – 17 September 1996) was a Chilean economist, lawyer, academic and political socialist. He served as the first president of the Inter-American Development Bank, where he gained a reputation as a "developmentalist."

== Campaign for United Nations Secretary-General, 1971 ==
Herrera was nominated by the Allende government for Secretary-General of the United Nations in the 1971 selection. He received wide support among Latin American countries, including right-wing governments such as Argentina's military junta. However, the United States opposed any candidate nominated by the leftist Allende government and felt that Herrera was "a poor manager to boot." On 5 November 1971, U.S. Ambassador George H. W. Bush met with Herrera and revealed that the United States would not support his candidacy. Herrera's campaign was resurrected later that month when the Chinese seat at the United Nations was transferred from Nationalist China to Communist China, which picked him as one of its top two choices for Secretary-General.

In the first round of voting, Herrera placed third but was vetoed by the United States. In the second round, he tied for third but was vetoed again. Herrera subsequently withdrew in favor of Carlos Ortiz de Rozas of Argentina, who placed first in the third round, only to be vetoed by the Soviet Union. Latin America had nominated candidates from opposite ends of the ideological spectrum, seeing both candidates vetoed by opposing superpowers. However, a Latin American would emerge as a dark horse candidate to win the deadlocked 1981 selection.

Preceded by none	President of the Inter-American Development Bank; 1960–1971	Succeeded by Antonio Ortiz Mena
