= Javier Pérez de Cuéllar =

Peruvian diplomat and politician (1920–2020)

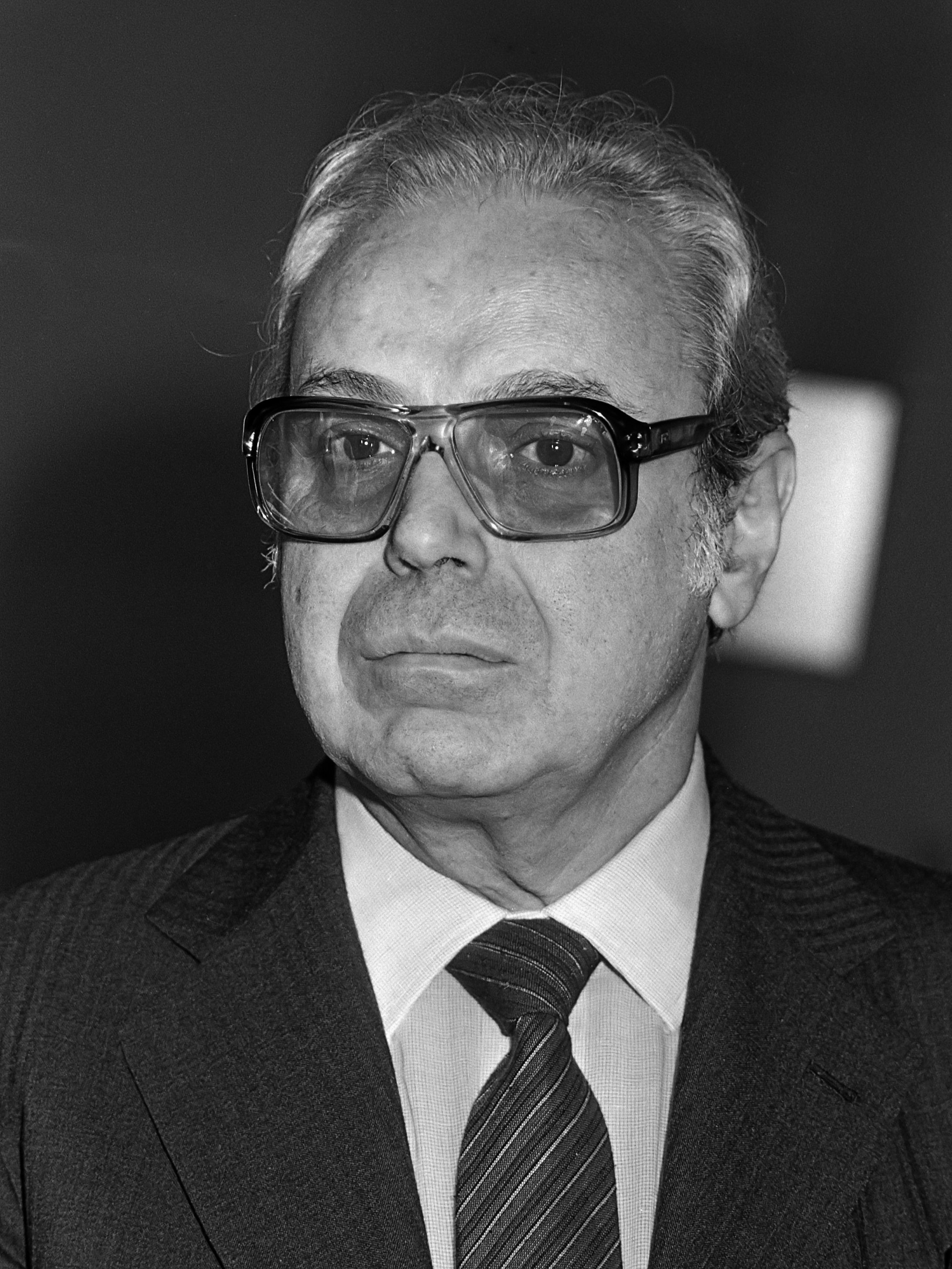
- Pérez de Cuéllar in 1982

5th Secretary-General of the United Nations
- In office 1 January 1982 – 31 December 1991
- Preceded by: Kurt Waldheim
- Succeeded by: Boutros Boutros-Ghali

Prime Minister of Peru
- In office 22 November 2000 – 28 July 2001
- President: Valentín Paniagua
- Preceded by: Federico Salas
- Succeeded by: Roberto Dañino

Minister of Foreign Relations
- In office 22 November 2000 – 28 July 2001
- Prime Minister: Himself
- Preceded by: Fernando de Trazegnies
- Succeeded by: Diego García-Sayán

Ambassador of Peru
- 1964–1966: Ambassador to Switzerland
- 1969–1971: Ambassador to the Soviet Union and Poland
- 1977–1979: Ambassador to Venezuela
- 2001–2004: Ambassador to France

Personal details
- Born: Javier Felipe Ricardo Pérez de Cuéllar Guerra; 19 January 1920 Lima, Peru
- Died: 4 March 2020 (aged 100) Lima, Peru
- Party: Union for Peru (from 1994)
- Spouses: Yvette Roberts-Darricau (m. 1947; div. 1975) Marcela Temple Seminario (m. 1975; died 2013)
- Children: 2 (by Roberts-Darricau)
- Education: Pontifical Catholic University of Peru
- Occupation: Diplomat; politician

Javier Felipe Ricardo Pérez de Cuéllar Guerra (Note: In this name that follows Hispanic American naming customs, the first or paternal surname is Pérez de Cuéllar and the second or maternal family name is Guerra.) (/ˈpɛrɛs də ˈkweɪjɑːr/, Spanish: [xaˈβjeɾ ˈpeɾes ðe ˈkweʝaɾ]; 19 January 1920 – 4 March 2020) was a Peruvian diplomat and politician who served as the fifth secretary-general of the United Nations from 1982 to 1991. He later served as prime minister of Peru from 2000 to 2001.

His two terms as secretary-general coincided with the final decade of the Cold War, and he engaged in efforts to address the Iran–Iraq War, the Western Sahara conflict, the Cyprus problem, Namibian independence under the Tripartite Accord, the Soviet withdrawal from Afghanistan, the Gulf War, and the opening of the Croatian War of Independence.

Pérez de Cuéllar was a member of the Club of Madrid, a group of former heads of state and government, and the Inter-American Dialogue.

== Biography ==
=== Early years ===
Pérez de Cuéllar was born on 19 January 1920 in Lima, Peru, to a rentier family of Spanish descent with ancestry from Cuéllar. His father, whose ancestors had migrated from Spain in the 16th century, died when he was 4. He attended Colegio San Agustín, learned French from a governess and earned a law degree from the Pontifical Catholic University of Peru in 1943.

=== Diplomatic career ===
Pérez de Cuéllar joined the Ministry of Foreign Affairs in 1940 first as an intern, the diplomatic service itself in 1944, serving after that as a 3rd Secretary at Peru's embassy in France, where he met and married his first wife, Yvette Roberts-Darricau (1922–2013), in 1947. He also held posts in Britain, Bolivia and Brazil, and later served as ambassador to Switzerland from 1964 to 1966, the Soviet Union and Poland from 1969 to 1971, and Venezuela from 1977 to 1979. From his first marriage, he had a son, Francisco, and a daughter, Águeda Cristina.

He was a member of the Peruvian delegation to the first session of the United Nations General Assembly, which convened in London in 1946, and of the delegations to the 25th through 30th sessions of the Assembly. In 1971, he was appointed permanent representative of Peru to the UN and led his country's delegation in the Assembly until 1975.

In 1973 and 1974, he represented Peru in the UN Security Council, serving as its president at the time of the Cypriot coup d'état in July 1974. On 18 September 1975, he was appointed Special Representative of the Secretary-General in Cyprus – a post he held until December 1977, when he rejoined Peru's foreign service. Also in 1975, Pérez de Cuéllar divorced his first wife and married Marcela Temple Seminario (1933–2013), with whom he had no children.

On 27 February 1979, he was appointed UN under-secretary-general for Special Political Affairs. From April 1981, he also acted as the Secretary-General's personal representative on the situation in Afghanistan; he visited Pakistan and Afghanistan in April and August of that year to continue negotiations initiated by the Secretary-General some months earlier.

=== United Nations Secretary-General ===
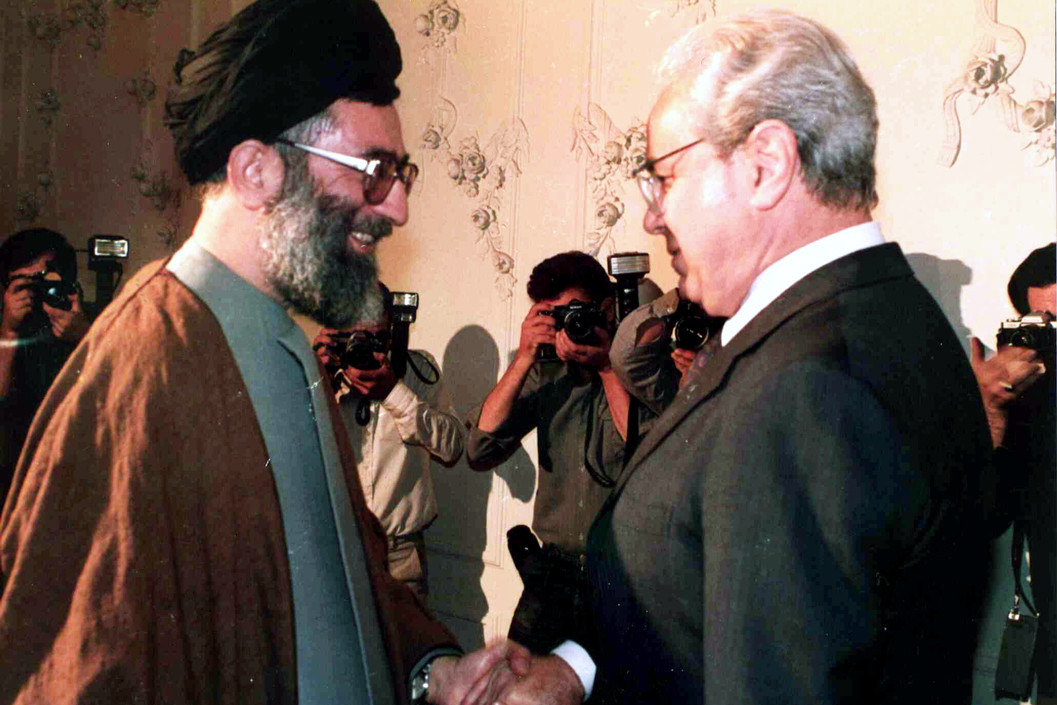
Pérez de Cuéllar and Iranian president Ali Khamenei in Tehran, 1987

In December 1981, Pérez de Cuéllar was selected to succeed Kurt Waldheim as Secretary-General of the United Nations; he was unanimously re-elected for a second term in October 1986.

During his two terms as Secretary-General of the United Nations, Pérez de Cuéllar mediated between the United Kingdom and Argentina in the aftermath of the Falklands War and promoted the Contadora group’s efforts to bring peace and stability to Central America. In 1983, he initiated the World Commission on Environment and Development (WCED) to promote sustainable development. He intervened in the negotiations for Namibia's independence, addressed the conflict in Western Sahara, and engaged in efforts to resolve the war between Croatian forces and the Yugoslav People's Army along with local Serb forces, as well as the Cyprus dispute. In March 1986, Pérez de Cuéllar formally accused Iraq of using chemical weapons against Iran during the Iran–Iraq War. Later that year, he presided over international arbitration in the Rainbow Warrior incident between New Zealand and France. During the build-up to the Gulf War, he facilitated negotiations that led US president George H. W. Bush to send Secretary of State James Baker to meet Iraqi deputy prime minister Tariq Aziz in Geneva. He played a role in ending the Cambodian Civil War, Salvadoran Civil War, and Nicaraguan Revolution, as well as negotiating the Soviet withdrawal from Afghanistan.

Shortly before the end of his second term, he rejected an unofficial request by members of the Security Council to reconsider his earlier decision not to run for a third term, shortened to two years, as a search for his successor had not, as of then, yielded a consensus candidate. A suitable candidate, Boutros Boutros-Ghali of Egypt, was agreed upon in November 1991, and Pérez de Cuéllar's second term as secretary-general concluded, as scheduled, on 31 December 1991.

=== Later life and death ===
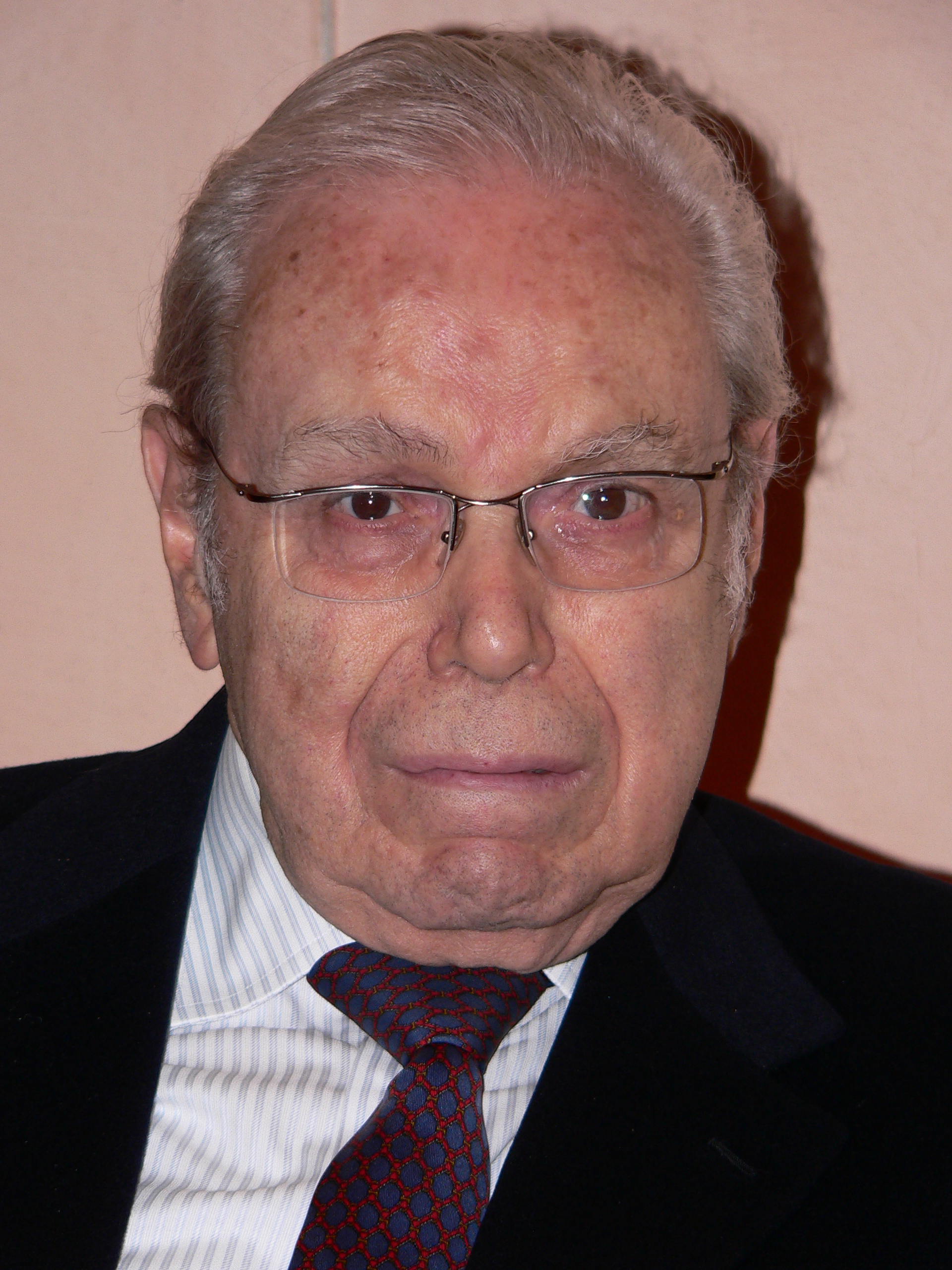
Pérez de Cuéllar in 2008

Pérez de Cuéllar ran unsuccessfully against Alberto Fujimori for president of Peru in 1995; following Fujimori's resignation over corruption charges, he served as prime minister and foreign minister from November 2000 until July 2001. After Alejandro Toledo's election as president in 2001, he went to Paris as Peru's ambassador to France, retiring in 2004.

In 1997, Pérez de Cuéllar published his memoir Pilgrimage for Peace in which he recounted his years at the UN. He served as Permanent Delegate of Peru to UNESCO until 2004.

Pérez de Cuéllar celebrated his 100th birthday in January 2020 and received congratulations from the United Nations on his 100 years of life. He was the first UN secretary-general to become a centenarian.

Pérez de Cuéllar died at his home in Lima on 4 March 2020 two months after he turned 100.

== Honours and awards ==
- 1987: Jawaharlal Nehru Award
- 1987: Prince of Asturias Award for International Cooperation
- 1989: "Golden Doves for Peace" International Award, issued by Italian research institute Archivio Disarmo
- 1989: Olof Palme Prize for International Understanding and Common Security
- 1991: Grand Cross of the Legion of Honour, French chivalric decoration
- 1991: Honorary Knight Grand Cross of St Michael and St George, bestowed by Queen Elizabeth II
- 1991: Golden Plate Award of the American Academy of Achievement
- 1991: Presidential Medal of Freedom, awarded by George H. W. Bush
- 1992: Freedom Medal

He received several honorary degrees from universities, such as the following:

- National University of San Marcos
- Vrije Universiteit Brussel
- Jagiellonian University
- University of Cambridge
- Université Laval
- University of Valladolid
- University of Salamanca
- Université libre de Bruxelles
- University of Coimbra
- Humboldt University of Berlin
- Pontifical Catholic University of Peru
- Paris 2 Panthéon-Assas University
- University of Nice Sophia Antipolis
- Charles University
- Sofia University
- Carleton University
- Visva-Bharati University
- Osnabrück University
- National University of Mongolia
- Moscow State University
- University of Malta
- Leiden University
- La Salle University
- Tufts University
- Johns Hopkins University
- University of Lima

== Notes ==
Diplomatic posts
Preceded by Kurt Waldheim	Secretary-General of the United Nations; 1982–1991	Succeeded by Boutros Boutros-Ghali
Political offices
Preceded by Federico Salas	Prime Minister of Peru; 2000–2001	Succeeded by Roberto Dañino
Preceded by Fernando de Trazegnies	Minister of Foreign Relations; 2000–2001	Succeeded by Diego García-Sayán
