= 1 for 7 Billion campaign =

1 for 7 Billion is a civil society campaign calling for the selection and appointment process of the UN Secretary-General to be reformed. It claims the current procedure, which was developed in 1946, is “outdated” and incompatible with selecting the best candidate. 1 for 7 Billion calls for the selection process to be open to public scrutiny and be based on merit. Its goal is to improve the selection procedures ahead of the appointment of the next Secretary-General in 2016.

== Background ==
1 for 7 Billion was launched in November 2014, when 12 non-governmental organisations (NGOs) sent a letter to all UN member states asking for “a more open and inclusive process engaging all UN member states [which] will help to revitalise the UN and enhance its global authority.”

1 for 7 Billion has its roots in an earlier civil society initiative, “UNSGselection”, aimed to improve the selection process ahead of the appointment of the Secretary-General in 2006 which was developed by the World Federalist Movement. The UNSGselection campaign promoted an overt selection process and sought to do this through the adoption of measures such as: listing candidate qualifications; an official timetable; assessments of candidates; and a system of background checks.

1 for 7 Billion is one of several civil society initiatives which has emerged to influence the appointment of the UN's ninth Secretary-General. The Elders, a group of former world leaders founded by Nelson Mandela, has also advocated for changes to the selection process as part of its “A UN Fit for Purpose” initiative.

In light of the absence of female Secretaries-General, the “Campaign to Elect a Woman Secretary-General” and the “SheUNited” campaign both advocate for a woman to be appointed. Similarly, the "UNSG Like Me" campaign aims to draw awareness to the lack of gender parity in high-level UN appointments through its interactive website, which allows users to see whether there has been a female UN leader appointed from their country. These campaigns differ from the 1 for 7 Billion campaign, which does not advocate for the next Secretary-General to necessarily be a woman.

== Objectives ==
Overall, 1 for 7 Billion advocates for greater transparency in the selection process for the UN Secretary-General. The campaign lists ten reforms which it claims will make the appointment of the next Secretary-General democratic and observable by UN member states and the general public. These are similar suggestions to those of UNSGselection and further call for formal selection criteria, a single, non-renewable term of appointment and the recommendation of multiple candidates by the Security Council to the General Assembly.

The 1 for 7 Billion campaign is also calling on the General Assembly to discourage candidates from making promises of high-level positions to nationals of the permanent five countries in exchange for their support.

As a civil society initiative, 1 for 7 Billion argues that civil society should play a greater role in the selection process, and works to inform non-governmental organizations and others about this issue. The campaign was described by Mogens Lykketoft, the President of the UN General Assembly, as a "driving force" in the engagement of civil society in the selection process.

== Previous Selection Process ==
There is an informal regional rotation scheme for the selection of the UN Secretary-General, despite the absence of any provision in the Charter of the United Nations that specifies such a scheme. It is speculated that Eastern Europe is a strong contender in the 2016 appointment as it is the only region from which a Secretary-General has never before been selected.

Article 97 of the United Nations Charter guides the selection procedure stating that “the Secretary-General is appointed by the General Assembly upon the recommendation of the Security Council”.

In practice, one candidate is chosen in private by the Security Council without discussing with member states or publishing a list of candidates. It is UN Security Council practice that the five permanent members of the Security Council – the United States, the United Kingdom, France, Russia and China – have an effective veto over the selection during this stage of the process, though this is not explicitly mentioned in the United Nations Charter. The final candidate is then submitted to the General Assembly for ratification. No candidate has ever been rejected by the General Assembly.

The appointment of the first UN Secretary-General, Trygve Lie, in 1945 saw a different selection process to that of his successors. Following his recommendation by the Security Council, the General Assembly held a secret ballot which saw Lie elected with 46 votes to three. The General Assembly also took an atypically prominent role in the re-appointment process deciding to extend Lie's term by majority vote in light of the Security Council being unable to agree on a recommendation for the next Secretary-General.

== Recent Changes to the Selection Process ==
The 1 for 7 Billion campaign has been advocating for changes to be made to the UN Secretary-General selection process since its launch in 2014. These changes include: formal nomination process with clear deadlines and job qualifications, a single, non-renewable seven-year term, engagement with the candidates and for the Security Council to nominate more than one candidate.

In September 2015, the British Government backed 1 for 7 Billion's proposed reforms for the selection process in a House of Lords debate on UN effectiveness. Petra Bayr, a member of the Austrian parliament, also tabled a motion in support of the 1 for 7 Billion campaign. In response, Mr. Sebastian Kurz, Austria's Foreign Minister, noted that the 1 for 7 Billion campaign's objectives were similar to those of the ACT group of Member States, of which Austria is a member.

In September 2015 the United Nations General Assembly passed Resolution 69/321 to ensure that the selection process of the Secretary-General is “guided by the principles of transparency and inclusiveness”.

Following this resolution, in December 2015 a letter was sent to all member states by the Presidents of the General Assembly and of the Security Council inviting them to nominate candidates for the role of Secretary-General, along with their credentials. General Assembly president Mogens Lykketoft has also planned public meetings in early 2016 for members to ask questions of the candidates.

To date, nine official candidates have been announced (in order of nomination): Srgjan Kerim, former UN General Assembly president; Vesna Pusić, Deputy Speaker of the Croatian Parliament; Igor Lukšić, Foreign Minister of Montenegro; Danilo Türk, former President of Slovenia; Irina Bokova, Director-General of UNESCO; Natalia Gherman, former Deputy Prime Minister of Moldova and Minister of Foreign Affairs; António Guterres, former UN High Commissioner for Refugees; Vuk Jeremic, former President of the UN General Assembly; and Helen Clark, former Prime Minister of New Zealand

In February 2016, 1 for 7 Billion started writing to all official candidates for the position of UN Secretary-General asking them to commit publicly to serving a single term of office and make the selection process open to public scrutiny.

== Structure ==
The 1 for 7 Billion campaign is led by an informal steering committee, which consists of Avaaz, Friedrich-Ebert-Stiftung New York, United Nations Association - UK, and the World Federalist Movement. It is supported by over 750 non-governmental organizations with an estimated reach of over 170 million people.

In addition to its own membership, 1 for 7 Billion collaborates with other civil society groups and UN member states engaged with this issue. 1 for 7 Billion has participated in events sponsored by the Elders group and the Accountability, Coherence, and Transparency (ACT) group of UN member states. It has also worked with Equality Now’s “Time for a Woman” campaign to encourage the candidacy of highly qualified women for the position of Secretary-General.
