= Max Jakobson =

Finnish diplomat and journalist (1923–2013)

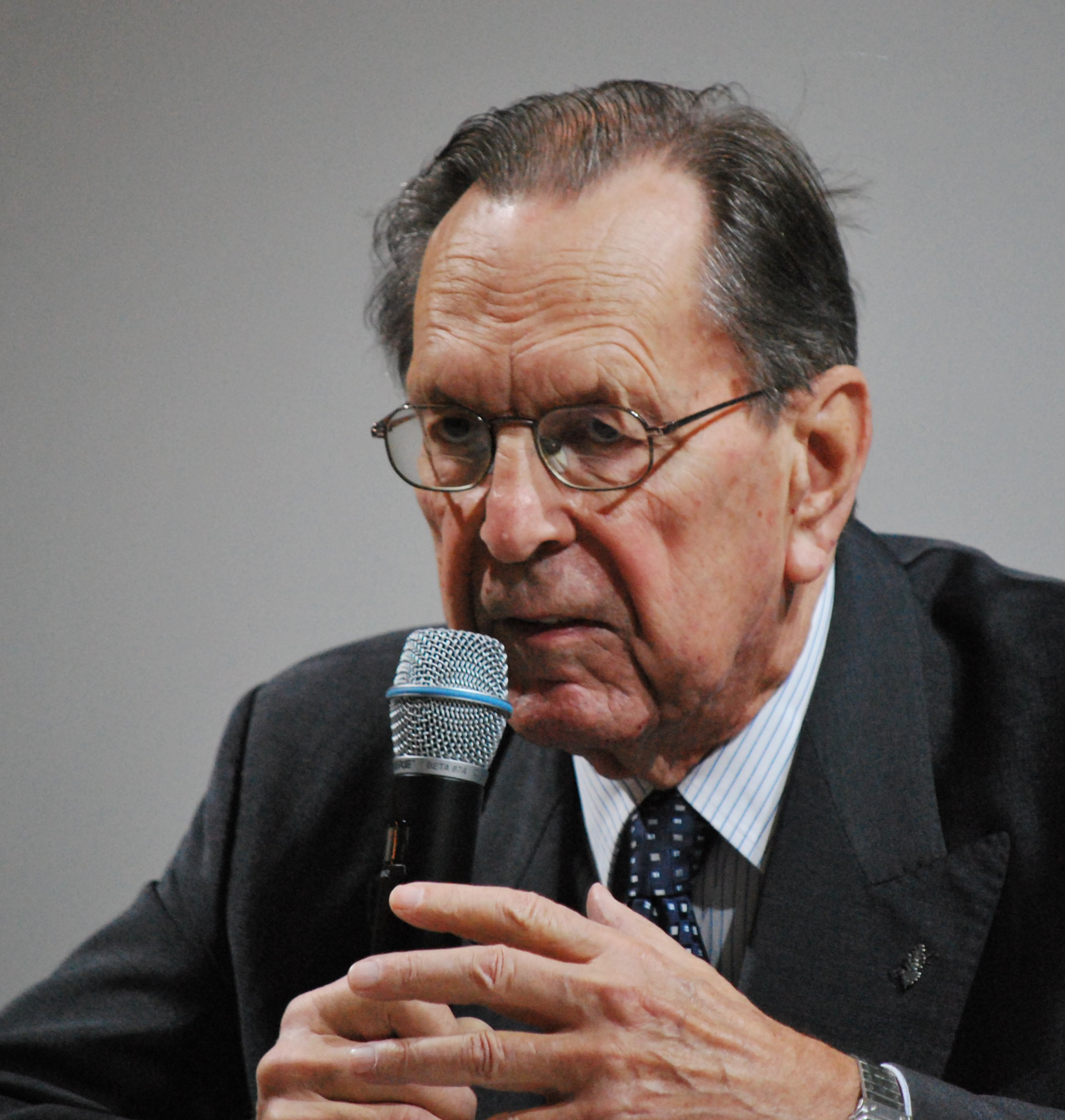

Finland Ambassador to the United Nations
- In office 1965–1971

Max Jakobson (September 30, 1923 – March 9, 2013) was a Finnish diplomat and journalist of Finnish-Jewish descent. Jakobson was an instrumental figure in shaping Finland's policy of neutrality during the Cold War.

Max Jakobson was born in 1923 in Viipuri, Finland (now Vyborg, Russia), as son of Finnish-Jewish lawyer Jonas Jakobson and his ethnic Finnish wife Helmi (née Virtanen). He began his career as a journalist. He worked at the BBC. From 1953 to 1974 he was employed by the Finnish Ministry for Foreign Affairs eventually acting as Finland's ambassador to the United Nations in 1965-1971 and Finland's Ambassador to Sweden in 1971−1974. Jakobson ran for United Nations Secretary-General in the 1971 selection. He was one of three candidates to receive the required 9 votes in the Security Council, but he was vetoed by the Soviet Union.

Jakobson was active as a commentator on Finnish politics, having written several books and numerous articles on Finnish political history and contemporary Finnish politics. He also acted as chairman of the Estonian International Commission for Investigation of Crimes Against Humanity investigating Communist and Nazi crimes in Estonia.

== Works ==
- Jakobson, Max (1961). The Diplomacy of the Winter War: An Account of the Russo–Finnish War, 1939–1940. Cambridge, MA: Harvard University Press.
- Englanti valinkauhassa (1952)
- Diplomaattien talvisota (1955)
- Kuumalla linjalla (1968)
- Paasikivi Tukholmassa (1978). ISBN 951-1-05126-1.
- Veteen piirretty viiva (1980). ISBN 951-1-06100-3.
- 38. kerros (1983). ISBN 951-1-07565-9.
- Jakobson, Max (1987). Finland: Myth and Reality. Helsinki: Otava.
- Vallanvaihto (1992). ISBN 951-1-12288-6.
- Finland in the New Europe (1998)
- Väkivallan vuodet, 20. vuosisadan tilinpäätös (1999). ISBN 951-1-13369-1.
- Pelon ja toivon aika, 20. vuosisadan tilinpäätös (2001). (ISBN 951-1-16581-X.
- Tilinpäätös, 20. vuosisadan tilinpäätös (2003). ISBN 951-1-18856-9.
- Tulevaisuus? (2005). ISBN 951-1-20354-1.
- Kohtalonvuodet – Suomi nousi, taipui ja selvisi (2008). ISBN 978-951-0-33113-2.

== Sources ==
- Tarkka, Jukka: Max Jakobson – kansainvälinen suomalainen ("Max Jacobson - International Finn"). Otava, 1983. ISBN 951-1-07591-8 (in Finnish)
