= Issoufou Saidou-Djermakoye =

Nigerien politician

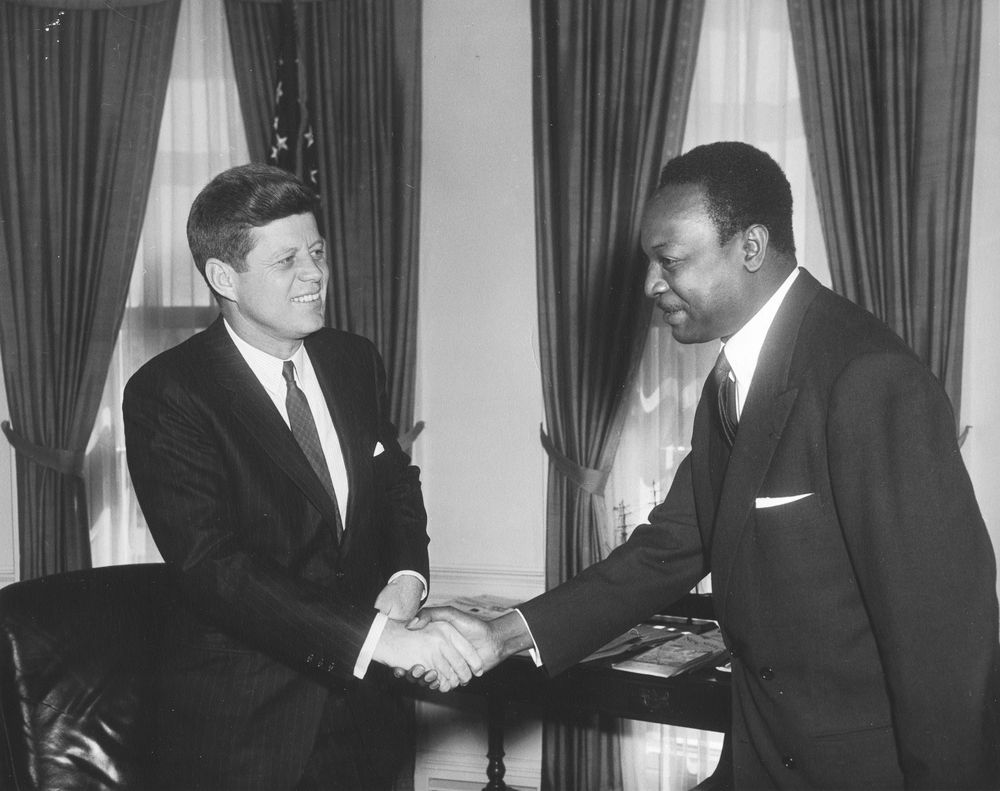
President John F. Kennedy Meets with Ambassador of Niger Issoufou Saidou Djermakoye

Issoufou Saidou-Djermakoye (born 10 July 1920 in Dosso, Niger; died 30 June 2000 in Paris) was a politician from Niger who was elected to the French Senate in 1958. He was later United Nations Under-Secretary-General in charge of the Department of Political Affairs, Trusteeship and Decolonization.
