= Draft (politics) =

Campaign to encourage a person to stand for political office

In politics, a draft is used to encourage or pressure a certain person to enter a political race, by demonstrating a significant groundswell of support for the candidate.

== United States ==
=== 20th century ===
Movements to draft five-star general Dwight D. Eisenhower to run as a candidate for President of the United States appeared in both the Democratic and Republican parties in 1948 and again during 1951. Eisenhower did his best to ignore them, but Henry Cabot Lodge Jr. entered Eisenhower in the 1952 New Hampshire Republican primary without the general's authorization. Eisenhower won all the Republican delegates and defeated Senator Robert A. Taft of Ohio, who had campaigned intensively in the state, by a vote of 50% to 38%. Eisenhower told a reporter, "Any American who would have that many other Americans pay him that compliment would be proud or he would not be an American", and announced his candidacy the next day. He defeated Adlai Stevenson — himself drafted as the Democratic nominee — in November 1952.

In the early 1960s, two volunteers started a movement to draft Barry Goldwater, an unlikely and unwilling candidate back then. Goldwater initially gave such remarks as "I'm not a candidate. And I'm not going to be. I have no intention of running for the Presidency", and "'Draft' nothing. I told you I'm not going to run." However, the effort eventually convinced Goldwater and won him the Republican nomination in 1964 in the face of the self-financed campaign of Nelson Rockefeller, the ridicule of the national press, and the refusal by Goldwater to run.

=== 21st century ===
The candidacy of General Wesley Clark was the result of a draft. Clark, who had retired from the military and taken a job as a CNN military analyst, had no intention of running until multiple "Draft Clark" sites appeared on the web urging Clark to run. Over an approximate two-month period the draft became a nationwide effort due to TV coverage and the use of the internet. In September 2003, Clark said he would make up his mind on whether to accept the draft or not in the near future. Soon after that statement, Clark announced his candidacy in his hometown of Little Rock, Arkansas, citing that he was pulled in by the people to run for the presidency.

There was a draft campaign for former Vice President Al Gore prior to the 2008 election. Gore, who had won the Nobel Prize while out of office, repeatedly ruled out running for president in the 2008 election. Gore eventually endorsed Senator Barack Obama after he became the presumptive nominee.

Prior to the 2008 election, a group of people tried to draft Secretary of State Condoleezza Rice for the presidency. The group went so far as to buy television and radio time in Iowa, New Hampshire, North Dakota, and Florida, and even roadside billboards. Though Rice had publicly declined to run, the groundswell of support for this cause continued to gain notoriety in national and international media. The most prominent "Draft Rice" group was called Americans for Rice.

In the fall of 2008, The Washington Times and the Boston Herald reported on a campaign to draft Joe Wurzelbacher to run against Rep. Marcy Kaptur of Ohio's 9th congressional district. The draft campaign began with the website joewurzelbacher2010.com, created by Trevor Lair, presently the chairman of the Massachusetts College Republicans. From the beginning of the draft campaign Wurzelbacher stated he was interested in running in the 2010 election for Ohio's 9th congressional district; when asked by Laura Ingraham in October 2008 if he would run against Rep. Marcy Kaptur, Wurzelbacher responded he had considered doing so and would be "up for it."

From 2013 to 2014, polls were conducted by media sources such as The Washington Post which suggested that if the 2012 US presidential election were held then, incumbent Barack Obama would lose to challenger Mitt Romney. Later on, from the middle of 2014 to 2015, polls that included Romney showed an overwhelming double-digit lead over even Jeb Bush,⁣ who was considered to be a front-runner of the party. This data combined helped to spark a movement to draft Mitt Romney into the race, the most notable example being found in the Draft Mitt Campaign. Romney would initially deny the possibility of a third run, eventually did end up flirting with the idea, but in late January 2015 confirmed he would definitely not be making another campaign for the Presidency, stating "I've decided it is best to give other leaders in the Party the opportunity to become our next nominee”.

In 2015, The New York Times reported that MoveOn.org and Democracy for America said they would support efforts to draft Elizabeth Warren into the 2016 US presidential race. The two groups created and ran the website Run Warren Run. Some Republicans saw her as potentially weakening Hillary Clinton's campaign, whilst Democrats hoped that the threat of Warren would push Clinton towards more populist stances on issues. Libertarians share Warren's disdain for the bank bailout, but for different reasons. In Iowa, where she was then largely unknown, an October 2014 poll showed that 44% of likely Democratic caucus goers had a favorable opinion of her, though more felt favorably about Clinton. In a January 2015 interview with Fortune Magazine, Warren denied interest in running. Warren ran unsuccessfully for the Democratic nomination in the 2020 presidential election.

== See also ==
- Shermanesque statement
