= 1996 United Nations Secretary-General selection =

Selection of Kofi Annan

- 19 November 1996 – 13 December 1996
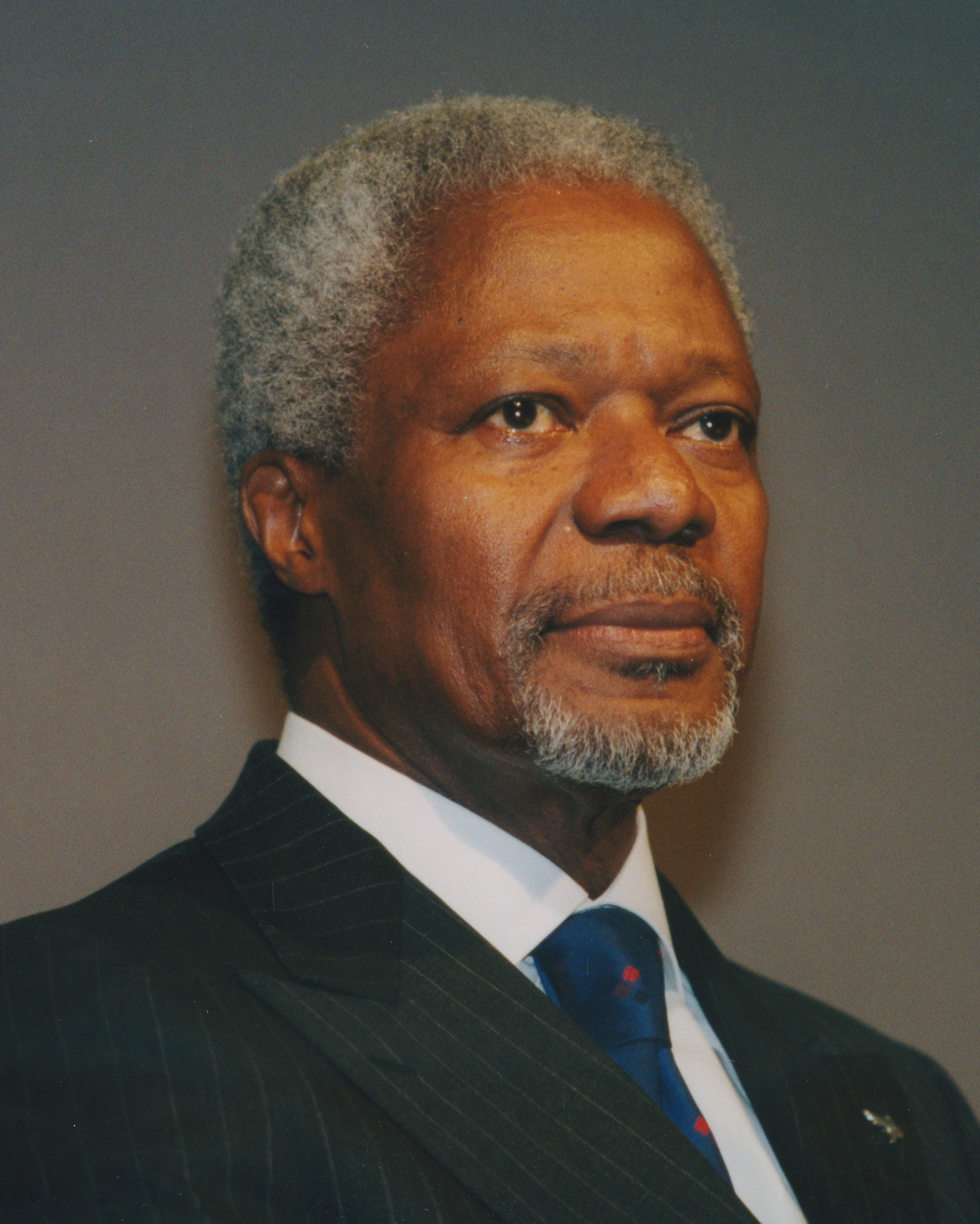

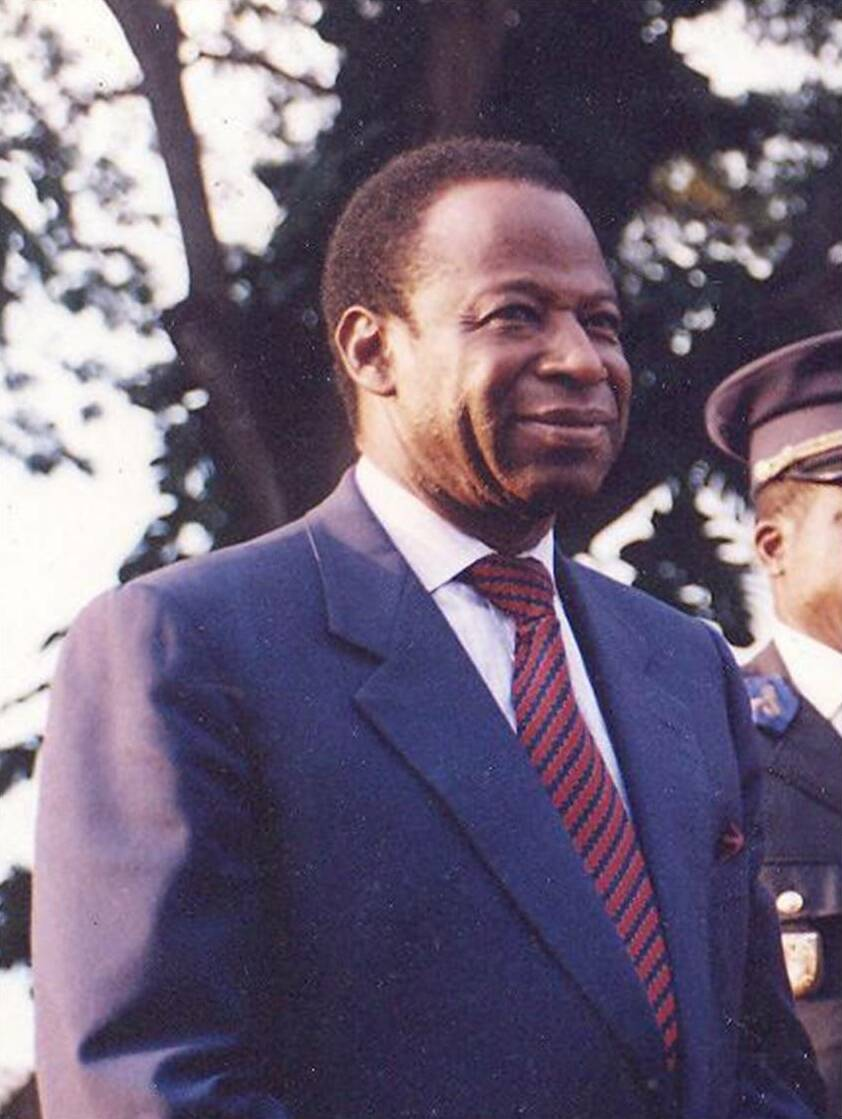

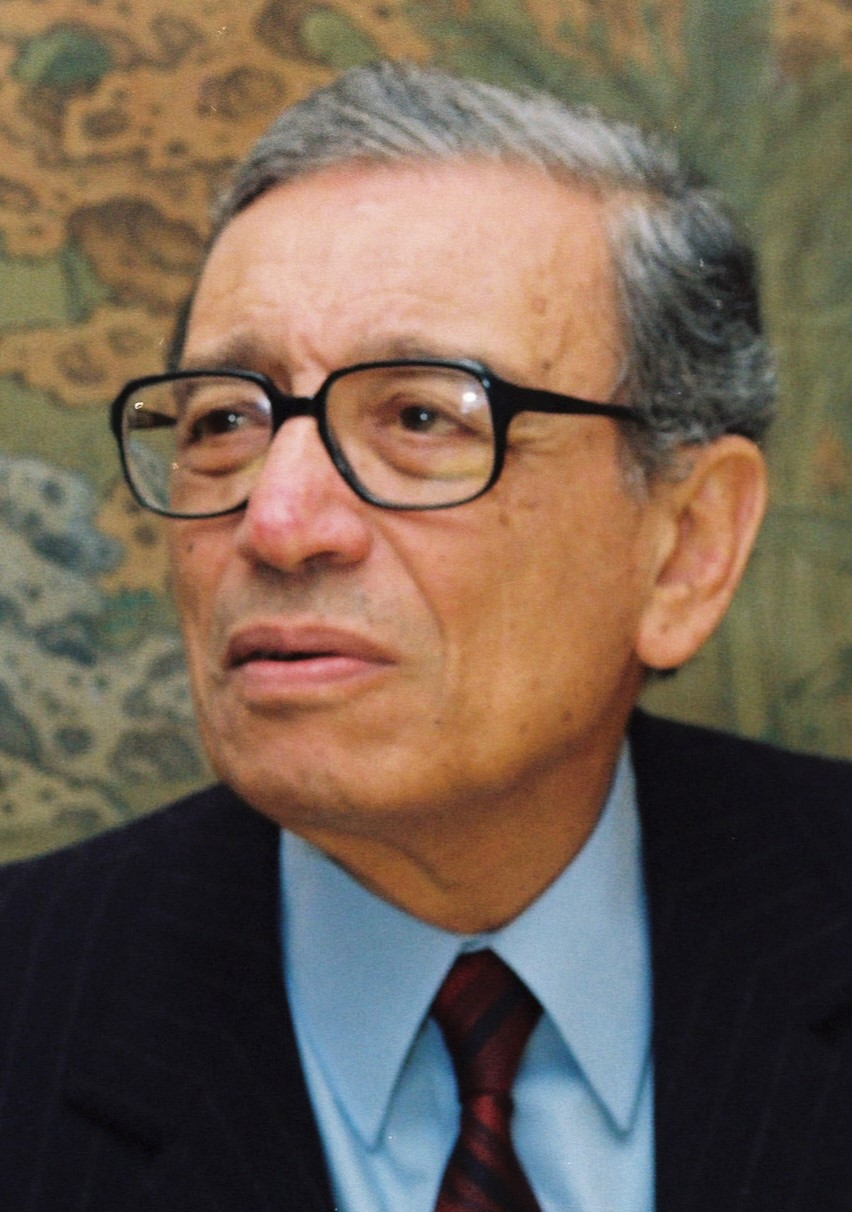
Candidate	Kofi Annan	Amara Essy	Boutros Boutros-Ghali
Country	Ghana	Ivory Coast	Egypt
Best vote	14 / 15	11 / 15	14 / 15
Vetoes	None	(United States) (United Kingdom)	(United States)
Round	Final closed session 13 December 1996	First open straw poll 10 December 1996	First closed session 19 November 1996
UN Secretary-General before election
Boutros Boutros-Ghali
Elected UN Secretary-General
Kofi Annan

A United Nations Secretary-General selection was held in 1996 at the end of Boutros Boutros-Ghali's first term. Boutros-Ghali ran unopposed for a second term and received the support of 14 of the 15 members of the United Nations Security Council. However, the United States vetoed his re-selection and eventually forced him to withdraw his candidacy.

The open selection then deadlocked as France vetoed all candidates from English-speaking countries, while the United States vetoed all candidates from French-speaking countries. France eventually changed its veto to an abstention, and Kofi Annan of Ghana was selected Secretary-General for a term beginning 1 January 1997. The 1996 selection marks the only time that a sitting Secretary-General was denied a second term.

== Background ==
The elderly Boutros-Ghali initially intended to serve only one term, but he ran for a second term in 1996. Traditionally, the Secretary-General is entitled to run unopposed for a second term. No sitting Secretary-General had ever been denied a second term by a veto. In the 1950 selection, Trygve Lie was vetoed by the Soviet Union, but he was re-appointed by the General Assembly without a recommendation from the Security Council. In the 1976 selection, Kurt Waldheim received a single symbolic veto from China, which turned around and voted for him in the second round.

Boutros Boutros-Ghali had been selected Secretary-General in 1991 without the support of the United States, which abstained. After 15 U.S. peacekeepers died in a failed raid in Somalia in 1993, Boutros-Ghali became a political scapegoat in the United States. U.S. ambassador Madeleine Albright criticized Boutros-Ghali for the failed raid, and U.S. president Bill Clinton announced that future U.S. peacekeepers "will be under American command." However, the dead peacekeepers had already been under U.S. command.

Tensions grew worse as Boutros-Ghali pressed the United States over $1.5 billion in unpaid U.N. dues, while the United States pushed him to cut programs that were favored by developing countries. The breaking point came over the Bosnian War, when Boutros-Ghali refused to allow British and French commanders to authorize airstrikes against Serb troops. During the 1996 U.S. presidential campaign, Republican candidate Bob Dole made fun of Boutros-Ghali's name, and Clinton decided to eliminate Boutros-Ghali to help in his own reelection bid.

== Re-selection of Boutros-Ghali ==
Boutros-Ghali ran unopposed for re-selection, as he enjoyed the support of every other member of the Security Council and was backed by the developing countries in the General Assembly. Boutros-Ghali had the support of France, as he spoke French fluently and had studied at the Sorbonne. Supporters of Boutros-Ghali also hoped that China would fight a veto duel with the United States, as it had done in the deadlocked 1981 selection. If the 1996 selection could be deadlocked, then the General Assembly could appoint Boutros-Ghali to a second term without a recommendation from the Security Council. The United States had set the precedent by taking the 1950 selection directly to the General Assembly after the Soviet Union vetoed Trygve Lie's second term.

=== Operation Orient Express ===
Madeleine Albright, Richard Clarke, Michael Sheehan, and James Rubin entered a secret pact, which they called "Operation Orient Express." The name reflected their hope that other countries would join the United States in overthrowing Boutros-Ghali. However, U.S. President Bill Clinton told them that they "would never pull it off."

As support for Boutros-Ghali grew, the United States increased the pressure on his supporters. U.S. officials threatened to "take action" against U.N. officials who campaigned for Boutros-Ghali using U.N. funds, even though it could not name anyone who had done so. An unnamed U.S. official warned in a United States Information Agency report that continued support for Boutros-Ghali would cost Africa its second term in the Secretary-General rotation. The United States even offered to support Salim Ahmed Salim of Tanzania, who had been vetoed by the U.S. after winning the 1981 selection by one vote. A former U.N. official said that the Clinton administration appeared to be in a "frenzy" over Boutros-Ghali's resistance.

On 17 November 1996, U.S. ambassador Madeleine Albright asked Boutros-Ghali to resign and offered to start a new foundation in Geneva for Boutros-Ghali to run. Other Western diplomats called the offer "ludicrous," as Boutros-Ghali's family was wealthy and already supported several foundations in Egypt, while Albright would have a hard time convincing the U.S. Congress to pay for a foundation. Boutros-Ghali declined the American offer and said that he was not looking for another job.

=== US veto ===
On 18 November 1996, the United Nations Security Council conducted a straw poll to gauge the level of support for Boutros-Ghali. The vote was 13–1–1, with only the United States voting against. The United Kingdom delegation abstained because it had not received any instructions from London.

On 20 November 1996, the Security Council met in closed session to consider draft resolution S/1996/952, appointing Boutros-Ghali for a second term. The resolution received 14 votes in favor, 1 vote against, and no abstentions. The only negative vote was the promised U.S. veto.

The U.S. veto was widely criticized by foreign diplomats, who referred to it as a "mugging." Boutros-Ghali complained that he was not "Noriega or Saddam Hussein" and compared the United States to the Roman Empire. CNN founder Ted Turner said that "Even England voted to re-elect this man and England always does what the United States asks them to do." British diplomat Brian Urquhart described members of the U.S. Congress were "very xenophobic, extremely touchy, and, I think, very ignorant," and said that the Secretary-General "isn't supposed to be a member of the [U.S.] State Department." Even the conservative New York Post criticized Clinton for "indulg[ing] an obsession" and "demonstrat[ing] extraordinary diplomatic isolation." Meanwhile, the conspirators in Operation Orient Express prevailed on Clinton to resist foreign pressure and continue the veto.

=== Deadlock ===
The Security Council met again on 21 November 1996 and 25 November 1996. No vote was taken, as none of the members had changed their positions. The United States also refused to nominate its own candidate, who would certainly be rejected by the Security Council. U.S. Ambassador Madeleine Albright insisted that the Africans must come up with their own candidate to replace Boutros-Ghali. American diplomats again warned that Africa would lose its turn in the Secretary-Generalship rotation if they did not come up with another candidate. However, Botswana's representative said that "We have a list composed of one person, Dr. Boutros-Ghali."

On 29 November 1996, the Security Council met again without taking a vote. The same day, the Chairman of the Organisation of African Unity wrote its members soliciting additional nominations. However, no nominations were forthcoming, as no African country wanted to undermine Boutros-Ghali by nominating another candidate. France and other European nations suggested a compromise in which Boutros-Ghali would be appointed to a short two-year term, following the precedent of U Thant's selection for a 17-month term in 1961. However, the United States did not respond to these proposals.

The impasse was finally broken on 5 December 1996, when Boutros-Ghali suspended his candidacy. The selection was now thrown open to other candidates.

== Open selection ==
Anticipating the U.S. veto, Security Council President Nugroho Wisnumurti of Indonesia laid down procedures on 12 November 1996 to be followed in case of an open selection. The Security Council would vote in secret in a series of straw polls. After a likely winner emerged, the next straw poll would have the permanent members voting on red paper to reveal the existence of any vetoes, while the rotating members voted on white paper. When at least one candidate received at least nine votes and no vetoes, a Resolution would finally be introduced and a vote would be taken. The "Wisnumurti Guidelines" formalized the process that had been used to break the deadlocked selection of 1981, and they have been used in all subsequent open selections.

Four African candidates were nominated to replace Boutros-Ghali: Amara Essy of Côte d'Ivoire, Kofi Annan of Ghana, Hamid Algabid of Niger, and Ahmedou Ould-Abdallah of Mauritania. The Security Council met on 6 December 1996 but did not vote, awaiting more candidates. However, no other candidates were nominated. Moustapha Niasse of Senegal was not nominated because he would be vetoed by China. Salim Ahmed Salim of Tanzania was not nominated because he would be vetoed by France, an ironic twist for a diplomat who had been vetoed by the United States in 1981. With the General Assembly expecting to end its session on 17 December 1996, the Security Council had only one week to select a Secretary-General.

In the first straw poll on 10 December 1996, Annan led with a vote of 12-2-1 with 1 veto, and Essy came in second with a vote of 11-4-0 with 2 vetoes. Annan was vetoed by France, while Essy was vetoed by the United States and the United Kingdom. Although Annan spoke French fluently, Ghana is a former British colony and Annan attended university in the United States.

In the second round, Annan led with a vote of 10-3-1 with 1 veto, and Essy came in second with 7 votes in favor and 2 vetoes. All of the French-speaking candidates were vetoed by the United States and the United Kingdom.

In the third round on 11 December 1996, Annan led with a vote of 11-4-0, including a French veto. Essy was in second place with a vote of 6-4-4, including U.S. and British vetoes. Despite the deadlock between the French-speaking and the English-speaking countries, diplomats believed that they had to find an African for the post because China would veto any non-African candidate.

In the fourth round on 12 December 1996, Annan became the favored candidate with a vote of 14-1-0, the sole negative vote being a French veto.

On 13 December 1996, France dropped its veto against Annan. The Security Council adopted Resolution 1090 by acclamation, recommending Kofi Annan to be the next Secretary-General of the United Nations. On 17 December 1996, the General Assembly adopted Resolution A/51/L.66, appointing Kofi Annan as Secretary-General for a term ending 31 December 2001.

== 2001 re-selection ==
Kofi Annan ran unopposed for re-selection in 2001. Due to Boutros-Ghali's non-reelection, a second Annan term would give Africa the office of Secretary-General for three consecutive terms. In 2001, the Asian Group agreed to a third term for Africa in return for the African Group's support for an Asian Secretary-General in the 2006 selection.

The Security Council passed Resolution 1358 by acclamation on 27 June 2001, recommending Annan for a second term. The General Assembly approved his reappointment on 29 June 2001 in Resolution A/55/L.87. Annan's second term ran until 31 December 2006, setting the stage for the 2006 Secretary-General selection.
