= 1950 United Nations Secretary-General selection =

Reappointment of Trygve Lie

- 12 October 1950 – 1 November 1950
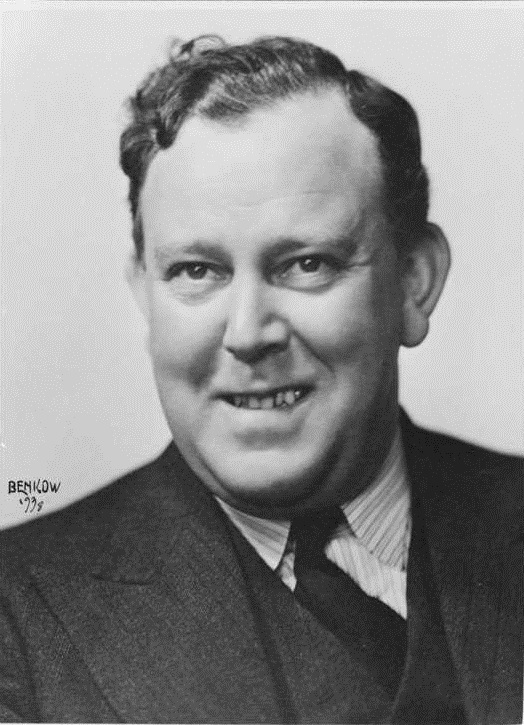

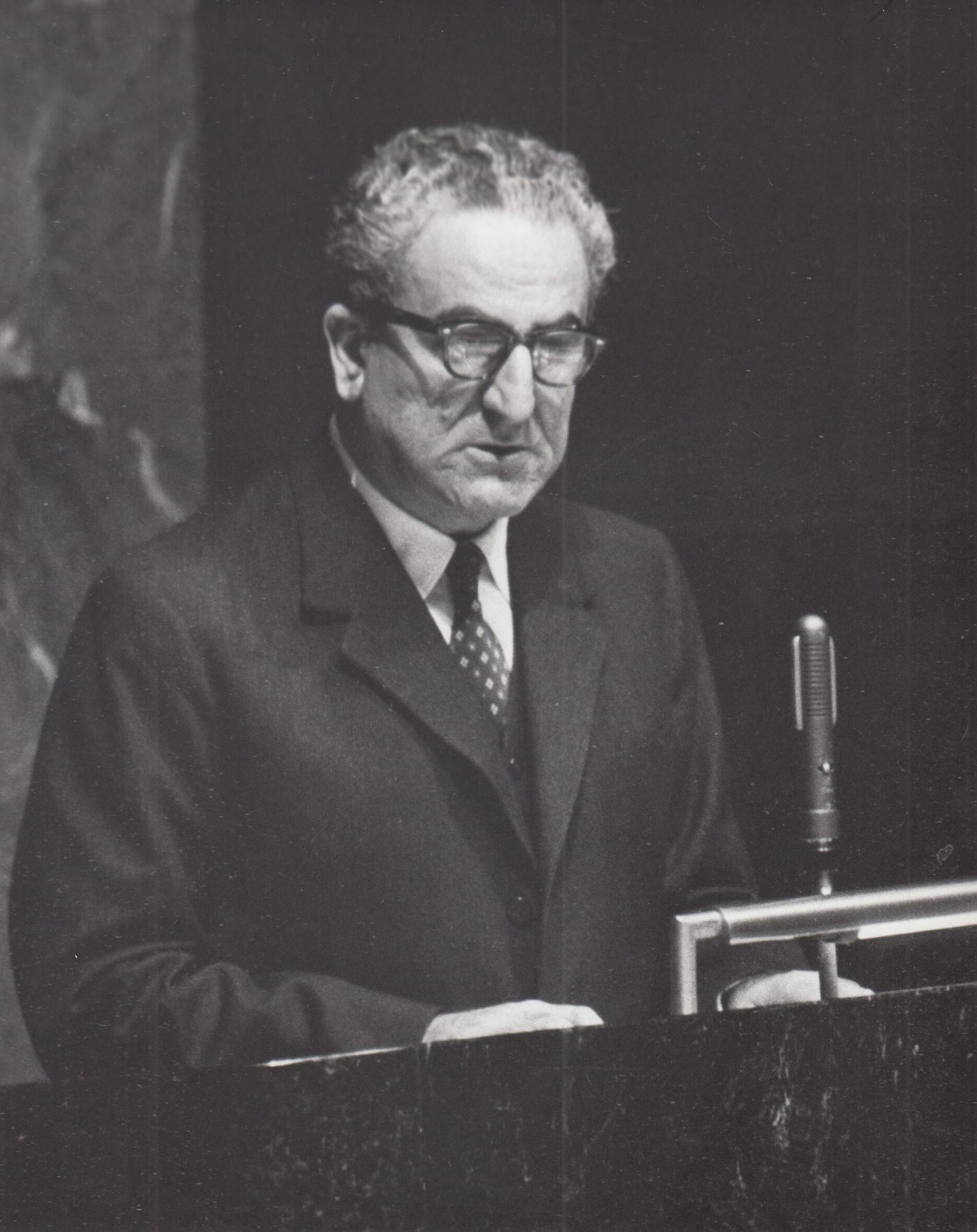

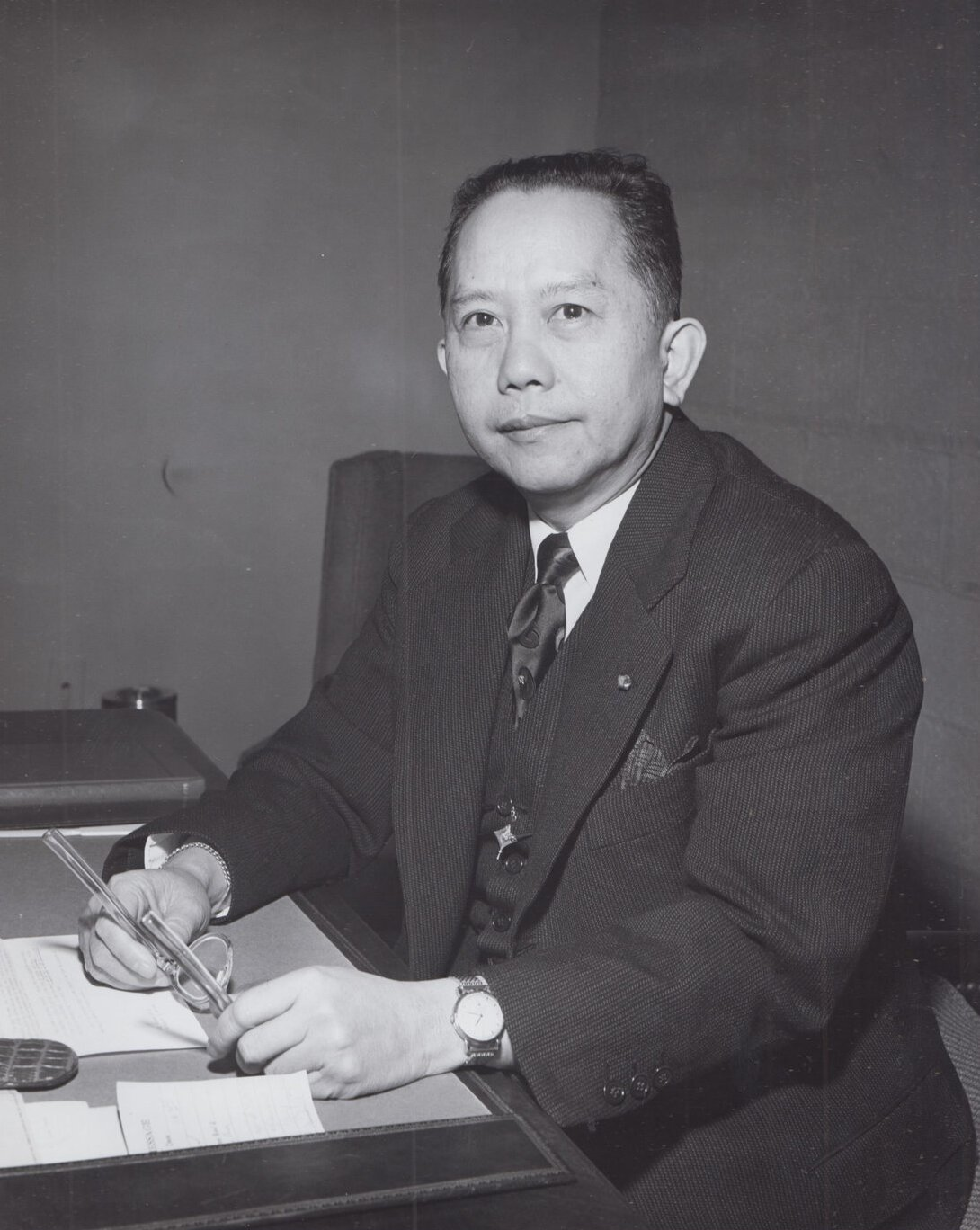
Candidate	Trygve Lie	Charles Malik	Carlos P. Romulo
Country	Norway	Lebanon	Philippines
Vote	9 / 11	4 / 11	4 / 11
Vetoes	(Soviet Union) (veto ignored)	None	None
Round	1st	2nd	2nd
UN Secretary-General before election
Trygve Lie
Elected UN Secretary-General
Trygve Lie

The United Nations Secretary-General selection of 1950 took place as the Cold War turned hot in the Korean War. The Soviet Union vetoed Trygve Lie's second term and offered to vote for any other candidate. However, the United States insisted that Lie had to continue in office as Secretary-General, pressuring its allies to abstain on all other candidates. When a Latin American candidate appeared to have enough votes to win, the United States threatened to use its veto for the first time. After a second round of voting with no candidates receiving the required majority, the Security Council informed the General Assembly that it had been unable to agree on a recommendation. The General Assembly then extended Lie's term for three years.

The 1950 selection is the only time that the General Assembly voted on the office of Secretary-General despite a veto in the Security Council. The Soviet Union considered the vote to be illegal and treated the office of Secretary-General as vacant upon the expiration of Lie's original term. The veto has been respected in all future selections. In the 1996 selection, the United States found itself on the losing side of a 14-1-0 vote recommending Boutros Boutros-Ghali for a second term. Although supporters of Boutros-Ghali pointed to the precedent set by the United States in 1950, other members of the Security Council were unwilling to refer the matter to the General Assembly over a U.S. veto in fear it would normalize the practice of the General Assembly voting on the office of Secretary-General over the objections of the permanent members. Boutros-Ghali was forced to suspend his candidacy, becoming the only Secretary-General ever to be denied a second term.

== Background ==
The Secretary-General of the United Nations is appointed by the General Assembly on the recommendation of the Security Council. Therefore, candidates can be vetoed by permanent members of the Security Council. At the first Secretary-General selection in 1946, the Soviet Union was opposed to Lester Pearson of Canada. The Security Council compromised by selecting Trygvie Lie of Norway as the first Secretary-General of the United Nations.

As the end of his 5-year term approached, Lie's actions drew opposition from both sides of the Cold War. After the Chinese Civil War ended in a Communist victory in 1949, Lie supported the admission of Communist China to the United Nations. The Nationalist Chinese ambassador gave a press conference on 31 May 1950 in which he denounced Lie and threatened to veto him. However, he was willing to extend Lie's term for one year. Meanwhile, the Soviet Union boycotted the United Nations on the grounds that the Chinese seat belonged to Communist China. France indicated that it would vote for Lie if the Soviet Union returned, but it would prefer a different candidate if the Soviet Union had left the United Nations permanently.

The Korean War began on 25 June 1950. Since the Soviet Union was boycotting the Security Council, it was unable to veto Resolution 83, which called on U.N. member states to send military assistance to South Korea. Lie's strong support of U.N. intervention in Korea made him unacceptable to the Communist countries. The Soviet Union returned to the Security Council in August 1950 when it was their turn to take up the rotating Presidency. Facing the prospect of a Soviet veto, supporters of Lie developed a new legal theory in which the General Assembly did not need a recommendation from the Security Council, since the recommendation from 1946 was still in effect. They also maintained that the General Assembly could extend Lie's term in office without a recommendation from the Security Council.

Support for Lie was lukewarm among the other three permanent members. Lie was "not entirely satisfactory" to the United States, but "he had been generally sympathetic to our views." The United States took the position that the General Assembly could amend its 1946 resolution to extend Lie's term for another five years. The United Kingdom wanted to extend Lie's term for no more than two years, which would allow a "more acceptable" Secretary-General to be appointed if the Soviet Union withdrew from the United Nations. France favored a one-year extension, but it supported the British position of a two-year maximum.

On 12 September 1950, the British ambassador approached the Soviet ambassador about the Secretary-Generalship. The United Kingdom was prepared to vote for Arcot Ramasamy Mudaliar or Girija Shankar Bajpai of India if they were acceptable to the Soviet Union. However, Soviet Ambassador Malik was noncommittal, and Soviet Foreign Minister Vyshinsky would not meet with the British ambassador.

Lie hoped to receive another five-year term, but he was willing to accept a two-year extension if he were allowed to save face by first declaring that he would "refuse to serve for longer than two years." Toward the end of September 1950, he grew frustrated with the inaction and threatened to send letters to the Security Council and the General Assembly declaring that he would not be a candidate for re-election. Lie finally agreed not to send those letters, and the United States pressed the United Kingdom and France for a three-year term extension. Lie subsequently declared publicly that he would not serve for more than three years.

== First round ==
=== Candidates ===
Candidates for Secretary-General
Image	Candidate	Position	Regional group
	(Poland) Zygmunt Modzelewski	Foreign Minister of Poland	Eastern Europe
	(Norway) Trygve Lie	UN Secretary-General (incumbent)	Western Europe

=== Vote ===
On 12 October 1950, the Security Council met for a formal vote. Polish Foreign Minister Zygmunt Modzelewski was first rejected by a vote of 1-4-6, with the Soviet Union voting in favor and Nationalist China voting against. Trygve Lie's reappointment was then rejected by a vote of 9-1-1, with the Soviet Union vetoing and Nationalist China abstaining.

The General Assembly was called back into session for 19 October 1950. Attempting to avoid the impending vote, Soviet ambassador Yakov Malik called upon U.S. ambassador Warren Austin on 17 October 1950. Austin chided the Soviet Union for "thwarting the will of the majority" and pointed out that Malik had turned down a previous attempt by the United States to consult on the selection. Malik argued that the Security Council had only voted on two candidates so far, and "the cause of peace" would be best served by agreeing on another candidate. However, Austin said that the Soviet Union should serve "the cause of peace" by agreeing to Lie's re-selection. Malik replied that he had received "a firm niet."

== Second round ==
=== Indian compromise proposal ===
On 18 October 1950, the Security Council met at the request of the Soviet Union. Soviet ambassador Yakov Malik reiterated that the Security Council was not yet deadlocked and should still explore other candidates, "particularly from Latin America and Asia." Indian ambassador Benegal Rau proposed that each member of the Security Council should secretly nominate two candidates. The list of 22 names would then be submitted to the permanent members, who could strike out any names that they found unacceptable. The Security Council would vote on anyone who remained on the list. The British and French ambassadors commended the "ingenious" scheme, and the Nationalist Chinese ambassador found it "satisfactory and fair." Cuba, Ecuador, Egypt, and the Soviet Union also favored the Indian plan.

The United States opposed the proposal. Austin pointed out that Lie had already received 9 votes, but his name would surely be struck off the list by the Soviet Union. He asked rhetorically, "Is the spoken word without value? Is there no integrity?" Norwegian ambassador Arne Sunde gave an impassioned speech in defense of his fellow countryman, claiming that the elimination of Lie would be "tantamount to a Soviet victory in the Korean War."

=== Diplomatic maneuverings ===
The Indian proposal set off a flurry of diplomatic activity as the superpowers appealed for support. The Soviet Union approached several delegations and offered to vote for their candidates. U.S. Secretary of State Dean Acheson pressed other members of the Security Council to hold firm on Lie, saying that allowing him to be vetoed "would damage the prestige of the Security Council by stultifying the clearly expressed majority."

The British government had already instructed its delegation to abstain on the Indian proposal, but it acquiesced to American wishes by authorizing Jebb to vote against. Although the United States remained worried about the British vote if a Commonwealth citizen were nominated, Jebb had already told the Norwegian ambassador that the UK was "not interested [in] seeing [an] Indian as Secretary General." However, France declined to issue instructions to its U.N. ambassador, allowing him to vote at his own discretion.

Cuba told the United States that it would continue to support Lie, although other Latin American governments favored the Indian proposal as "a means of conciliation". The Cuban ambassador suggested that the United States adopt the Indian proposal but exempt Lie's name from being struck off the ballot. Austin denounced the "Soviet maneuver" as a "trick and a trap", saying that the Korean War was "approaching victory" and the U.S. Congress would be hesitant to continue funding the effort with an untested Secretary-General at the helm. He claimed that "this was in no way a threat but simply an analysis of a situation".

The Security Council discussed the question on 20 October 1950 and 21 October 1950. The United States, United Kingdom, Cuba, Norway, and Yugoslavia were opposed to the Indian proposal, which left it one vote short of a majority. The Soviet Union then proposed further consultations of the permanent members, which the Security Council agreed to by a bare majority of 7-0-4.

=== Candidates ===
Candidates for Secretary-General
Image	Candidate	Position	Regional group
	(India) Benegal Rau	Representative of India on the Security Council	Eastern Europe and Asia
	(Lebanon) Charles Malik	Ambassador of Lebanon to the U.N.	Eastern Europe and Asia
	(Mexico) Luis Padilla Nervo	Ambassador of Mexico to the U.N.	Latin America
	(Philippines) Carlos P. Romulo	Former President of U.N. General Assembly	Eastern Europe and Asia

=== Instructions ===
The permanent members met for consultations on 23 October 1950. The Soviet Union nominated Luis Padilla Nervo of Mexico, Charles Malik of Lebanon, and Benegal Rau of India. Nationalist China nominated Carlos P. Romulo of the Philippines. The United States said that it would only support Lie. The United Kingdom preferred Lie but would not veto any of the other candidates. The Soviet Union was willing to vote for any candidate except Lie. China was willing to vote for Padilla Nervo, Malik, or Romulo. France was willing to vote for any candidate who could get 7 votes at the Security Council.

The United States was worried about the French position and pressed the French government to change its instructions. The United States also asked the other candidates to withdraw, with particular attention paid to Padilla Nervo. Since Cuba and Ecuador could be counted on to vote for a Latin American candidate, Nervo would have at least six votes in the Security Council, and a French vote would give him the required 7-vote majority. Secretary of State Dean Acheson was adamant that "no Latin American candidate would be accepted by the United States," saying that the Latin American countries "would very seriously embarrass themselves by running up against a United States veto." President Harry S. Truman agreed with Acheson and authorized a veto. Acheson instructed the U.S. delegation that the Soviet Union could not be permitted to allow a Soviet victory at the U.N. to "prejudice our victory in Korea."

The veto threat was controversial, as the United States had previously stated that it would not use the veto except when the security of the United States was threatened. However, the Latin American countries fell into line behind the United States. The U.S. position grew stronger when France instructed its U.N. ambassador to abstain on every candidate except Lie, causing Padilla Nervo to withdraw from the race. However, Charles Malik pointed out that the Soviet Union was offering to vote even for anti-Communist candidates, and the "opportunity to exploit such rare phenomenon should not be passed over lightly."

=== Vote ===
The Security Council met in secret session on 25 October 1950. Padilla Nervo's withdrawal was announced by France, and Benegal Rau withdrew his own name from consideration. U.S. ambassador Austin "wondered what answer he could be expected to give to the parents of those who had died in Korea." Soviet ambassador Malik called Lie a "pawn" of "MacArthur and U.S. monopolists" and attacked the United States for abandoning its "widely advertised position" of not using the veto. Malik then demanded that the Security Council vote on the remaining candidates.

Charles Malik and Carlos P. Romulo were both rejected by votes of 4-0-7. Egypt, India, China, and the Soviet Union voted in favor, while the other countries abstained. The Security Council then voted 7-1-3 to send a letter to the General Assembly reporting that it had been unable to reach agreement. Although the Soviet Union voted against the letter, procedural matters are not subject to the veto.

=== Extension of Lie's term ===
At the Security Council on 30 October 1950, the Soviet Union proposed a resolution asking the General Assembly to postpone the appointment of a secretary-general. The Soviet proposal was rejected by a vote of 1-7-3. The Soviet Union then announced publicly that it would no longer recognize Trygve Lie as Secretary-General after his term ended on 2 February 1951, since any vote by the General Assembly to extend his term was "an artificial maneuver designed to circumvent the [U.N.] Charter."

The General Assembly took up the appointment of a secretary-general on 31 October 1950 and 1 November 1950. U.S. Ambassador Austin praised Lie's "stand against aggression in Korea," while Soviet Foreign Minister Vishinsky said that the vote made a "mockery" of the United Nations. The General Assembly voted 37-9-11 to reject a Soviet proposal to postpone the question. It also voted 35-15-7 to reject an Iraqi proposal to study the process of appointing the Secretary-General and develop a solution.

Finally, the General Assembly voted 46-5-8 to extend Lie's term by three years to 2 February 1954. Only the five Soviet bloc countries voted against the resolution. Six Arab countries abstained because of Lie's stance on Palestine, comparing Israeli actions against the Palestinians to North Korea's invasion of South Korea. Nationalist China also abstained, and Australia abstained because it felt the vote was an illegal circumvention of the U.N. Charter.

== Aftermath ==
At the critical Security Council meeting on 25 October 1950, U.S. Ambassador Austin was confidently predicting a United Nations victory in the Korean War. Austin talked of the need for Lie to remain in office to oversee the postwar reconstruction of Korea. However, events were already in motion that would turn the war into a stalemate. Earlier that day, Chinese Communist troops ambushed United Nations forces at the Battle of Onjong and the Battle of Unsan. By the end of December 1950, United Nations forces had retreated south of the 38th Parallel. The war settled into a stalemate by the middle of 1951. Lie announced his resignation on 10 November 1952, declaring, "I am quite sure that this is the time to leave without damage to the UN." This set the stage for the 1953 United Nations Secretary-General selection.

The 1950 selection marks the only time that the General Assembly voted on a secretary-general without the recommendation of the Security Council. In 1966, Francis T. P. Plimpton, former Deputy U.S. Representative to the U.N., said that the 1950 vote by the General Assembly had "little taint of legality." The veto would be respected in all future selections. In the 1996 selection, the re-selection of Boutros Boutros-Ghali was vetoed by the United States in a 14-1-0 vote. Supporters of Boutros-Ghali hoped to use the precedent set by the United States in 1950 to take the matter to the General Assembly. France attempted to extend Boutros-Ghali's term by two years in office, but Boutros-Ghali suspended his candidacy after a two-week deadlock in the Security Council. There has been no further challenge to the use of the veto to block the selection of a secretary-general.
