= United Nations Security Council Resolution 2580 =

UN Security Council Resolution 2580
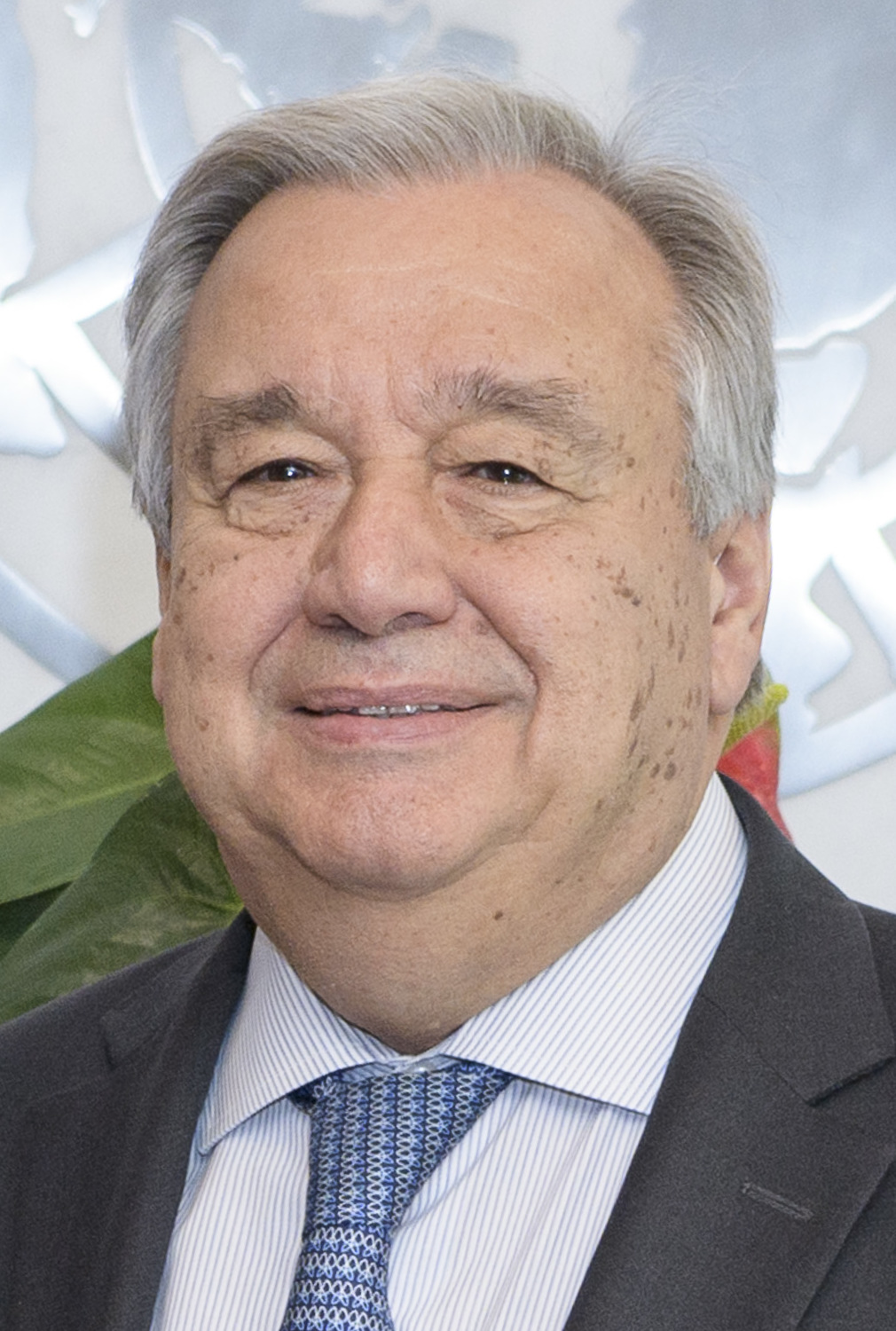
- António Guterres
- Date: 8 June 2021
- Meeting no.: 8,789
- Code: S/RES/2580 (Document)
- Subject: Recommendation regarding the appointment of the Secretary-General
- Result: Adopted

Security Council composition
- Permanent members: China; France; Russia; United Kingdom; United States
- Non-permanent members: Estonia; India; Ireland; Kenya; Mexico; Niger; Norway; St.Vincent–Grenadines; Tunisia; Vietnam

United Nations Security Council Resolution 2580, adopted by acclamation at a closed meeting on June 8, 2021, having considered the question of the recommendation for the appointment of the Secretary-General of the United Nations, the Council recommended to the General Assembly that Mr. António Guterres be appointed for a second term of office from January 1, 2022, to December 31, 2026.

Secretaries-general are traditionally elected to two terms, so Guterres' re-election was uncontested.

== See also ==
- List of United Nations Security Council Resolutions 2501 to 2600 (2019–2021)
- United Nations Security Council Resolution 1358 (2001)
- United Nations Security Council Resolution 1987 (2011)
