= United Nations Security Council Resolution 1090 =

UN Security Council Resolution 1090
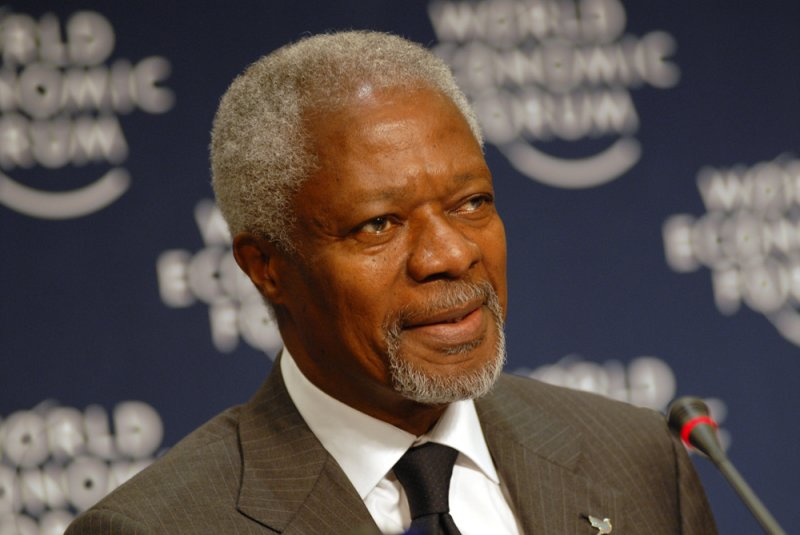
- Kofi Annan
- Date: 13 December 1996
- Meeting no.: 3,725
- Code: S/RES/1090 (Document)
- Subject: Recommendation regarding the appointment of the Secretary-General
- Result: Adopted

Security Council composition
- Permanent members: China; France; Russia; United Kingdom; United States
- Non-permanent members: Botswana; Chile; Egypt; Guinea-Bissau; Germany; Honduras; Indonesia; Italy; South Korea; Poland

United Nations Security Council resolution 1090, adopted without a vote at a closed meeting on 13 December 1996, having considered the question of the recommendation for the appointment of the Secretary-General of the United Nations, the Council recommended to the General Assembly that Mr. Kofi Annan be appointed for a term of office from 1 January 1997, to 31 December 2001.

Kofi Annan, a Ghanaian diplomat, was the seventh Secretary-General of the United Nations. The United States had vetoed another term for his predecessor, Boutros Boutros-Ghali, due to lack of reform.

It was the first time that a Security Council resolution had been adopted by acclamation.

== Background ==
Prior to the dispute, Boutros-Ghali had been preferred by France to continue as Secretary-General. However, Boutros-Ghali was disliked by the Clinton administration. Madeleine Albright, US ambassador to the United Nations, was a particularly vocal critic of Boutros-Ghali's. This led to the United States using its veto.

The choice to veto Boutros-Ghali came from several points. Boutrous-Ghali had opposed further sanctions on Cuba, Iran, and Libya. Boutros-Ghali was also viewed as anti-reform within the United Nations. Furthermore, he was described as being "useless, conceited and a megalomaniac into the bargain, if not corrupt."

Boutros-Ghali had actually tried to propose reforms to the United Nations. However, these reforms would have reduced United States power internationally. Boutros-Ghali's reforms saw the United Nations taking a more proactive approach to conflict management, which would require funding increases. However, the reform that the United States wished to see would instead see the United Nations' international activities be reduced. Reforms to that effect had already been ongoing for some time. UN personnel has been cut 25%, from 12,000 to 9,000, with plans to go down to 8,000 in the future. High-paying jobs were reduced from 48 to 37, which was a 40% increase from a decade prior. Finally, the operating budget of the United Nations in 1996-97 was $117 million less than the previous year's. However, the United States wished for the United Nations to give up humanitarian aid nearly in its entirety.

There was opposition to the United States paying dues obliged to the United Nations; by the end of 1996, the United States owed approximately $1.5 billion. Boutros-Ghali had been outspoken on the topic of the United States paying these dues. There was also opposition to the United Nations being allowed to determine which conflicts the United States would participate in.

The United States also took issue with political positions held by Boutros-Ghali, such as a desire to focus on development of Africa, criticism of support for Bosnia and Herzegovina compared to other regions struggling at the same time, such as Somalia and Rwanda, and criticizing Israel for their handling of the Israeli–Palestinian and Israeli–Lebanese conflicts, particularly the Qana massacre.

Leadership of UNICEF was another point of contention. Boutros-Ghali was of the belief that UNICEF should be led by a woman. Previous to this, UNICEF had often by led by Americans. However, both Belgium and Finland had been pushing for women candidates to be given chances to lead. Madeleine Albright was a vocal opponent to this point, insisting that an American should lead UNICEF. This conflict was finally resolved by the election of Carol Bellamy, an American woman.

Some of the reasons cited for the opposition to Boutros-Ghali were based in misinformation, such as a claim that he had been using money to pay for other senior UN officials to take trips to Africa using US taxpayer money.

Prior to further discussions, the French government threatened to use their veto against any candidates from non-Francophone countries. The French preference for Francophone candidates was another reason for the US using its veto.

During this period, there were talks of the United States leaving the United States, proposed by The Heritage Foundation and Joe Scarborough.

== Dispute ==
Due to these factors, the United States used its Security Council veto to reject Boutros-Ghali's re-election bid. Boutros-Ghali initially indicated a desire to overpower the US veto. He refused to step down for a time.

Following the veto, some wished to see a different canidate from Africa replace Boutros-Ghali, as he was the first Secretary-General from Africa.

Annan was the preferred candidate for the Clinton administration. However, France opposed him for this reason, in return for United States opposition to the re-election of Boutrous-Ghali. The other candidates suggested included Amara Essy, Hamid Algabid, and Ahmedou Ould-Abdallah. Following the United States veto, France preferred Essy.

After several weeks of nominating canidates, the Security Council met on 6 December 1996 but did not vote, awaiting more candidates. However, no other candidates were nominated. With the General Assembly expecting to end its session on 17 December 1996, the Security Council had only one week to select a Secretary-General.

Several rounds of voting were done on 10 and 11 December, 1996. In the fourth round, Annan became the clear choice by the council, with only France remaining as a holdout. Following this, France dropped its veto against Annan.

== See also ==
- List of United Nations Security Council Resolutions 1001 to 1100 (1995–1997)
- 1996 United Nations Secretary-General selection
