= Luis Padilla Nervo =

Mexican politician

His Excellency Luis Padilla Nervo
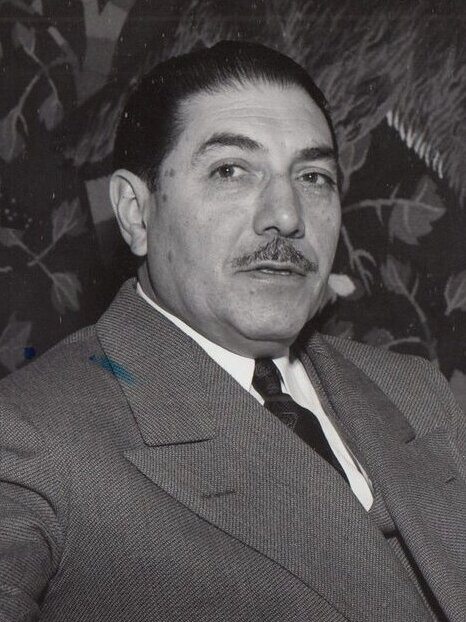
- Padilla Nervo in 1951

Secretary of Foreign Affairs
- In office 1 December 1952 – 30 November 1958
- President: Adolfo Ruiz Cortines
- Preceded by: Manuel Tello Baurraud
- Succeeded by: Manuel Tello Baurraud

President of the United Nations General Assembly
- In office 1951–1952
- Preceded by: Nasrollah Entezam
- Succeeded by: Lester B. Pearson

Personal details
- Born: 19 August 1894 Zamora, Michoacán
- Died: 9 September 1985 (aged 91) Mexico City
- Party: PRI
- Education: UNAM
- Profession: Lawyer, Diplomat

Luis Padilla Nervo (Note: In this Mexican name, the surname is Padilla and the second or maternal family name is Nervo.) (19 August 1894 – 9 September 1985) was a Mexican politician and diplomat. He served as secretary of foreign affairs, as permanent representative to the United Nations and president of the sixth session of the United Nations General Assembly, and as a judge on the International Court of Justice.

== Career ==
Luis Padilla Nervo was born in Zamora, Michoacán, in 1894. He studied law at the National Autonomous University of Mexico (UNAM). He also did postgraduate work at American, French, and British universities.

During the 1930s, he was ambassador to El Salvador, Paraguay, Costa Rica, and Denmark. In the Mexican public administration, he served in the Secretariat of the Interior, the Secretariat of Public Education and the Secretariat of Labor.

Luis Padilla Nervo represented Mexico at the San Francisco Conference in 1945 and signed the United Nations Charter. In addition, he was Mexico's first permanent representative to the United Nations; in that position, he was a member of the United Nations Security Council in 1946. He was nominated by the Soviet Union as a candidate in the 1950 process to select the organization's secretary-general but ultimately his name was withdrawn from consideration. During its sixth session (1951–1952), he was president of the United Nations General Assembly.

From 1952 to 1958, he served as secretary of foreign affairs under President Adolfo Ruiz Cortines. During his tenure, his name was put forward again as a candidate for UN secretary-general in the 1953 selection process. At the end of Ruiz Cortines's presidential term, he returned to the United Nations for a further four years as permanent representative. He was then elected as a judge of the International Court of Justice (ICJ) for the period 1964 to 1973, the second Mexican to serve on the ICJ after Isidro Fabela. In 1980, he was awarded the Senate's Belisario Domínguez Medal of Honor for his contributions "toward the welfare of the Nation and mankind".

Padilla Nervo authored one book, Testimonios de 40 años de presencia de México en las Naciones Unidas, published in 1985.

Luis Padilla Nervo died in Mexico City on 9 September 1985.

== Books ==
- Testimonios de 40 años de presencia de México en las Naciones Unidas, ISBN 9789688101001, 9688101001

== Family ==
Padilla Nervo's parents were Luis G. Padilla and Ángela Nervo. He was a nephew of the poet Amado Nervo, whose funeral in Montevideo, Uruguay, he attended.

== Notes ==
Political offices
Preceded by Manuel Tello Baurraud	Secretary of Foreign Affairs; 1952–1958	Succeeded by Manuel Tello Baurraud
Diplomatic posts
Preceded by Position created	Permanent Representative of Mexico to the United Nations; 1945–1952	Succeeded by Martín Luis Guzmán
Preceded by Rafael de la Colina	Permanent Representative of Mexico to the United Nations; 1959–1963	Succeeded by Jorge Castañeda y Álvarez de la Rosa
