= United Nations Security Council Resolution 1987 =

UN Security Council Resolution 1987
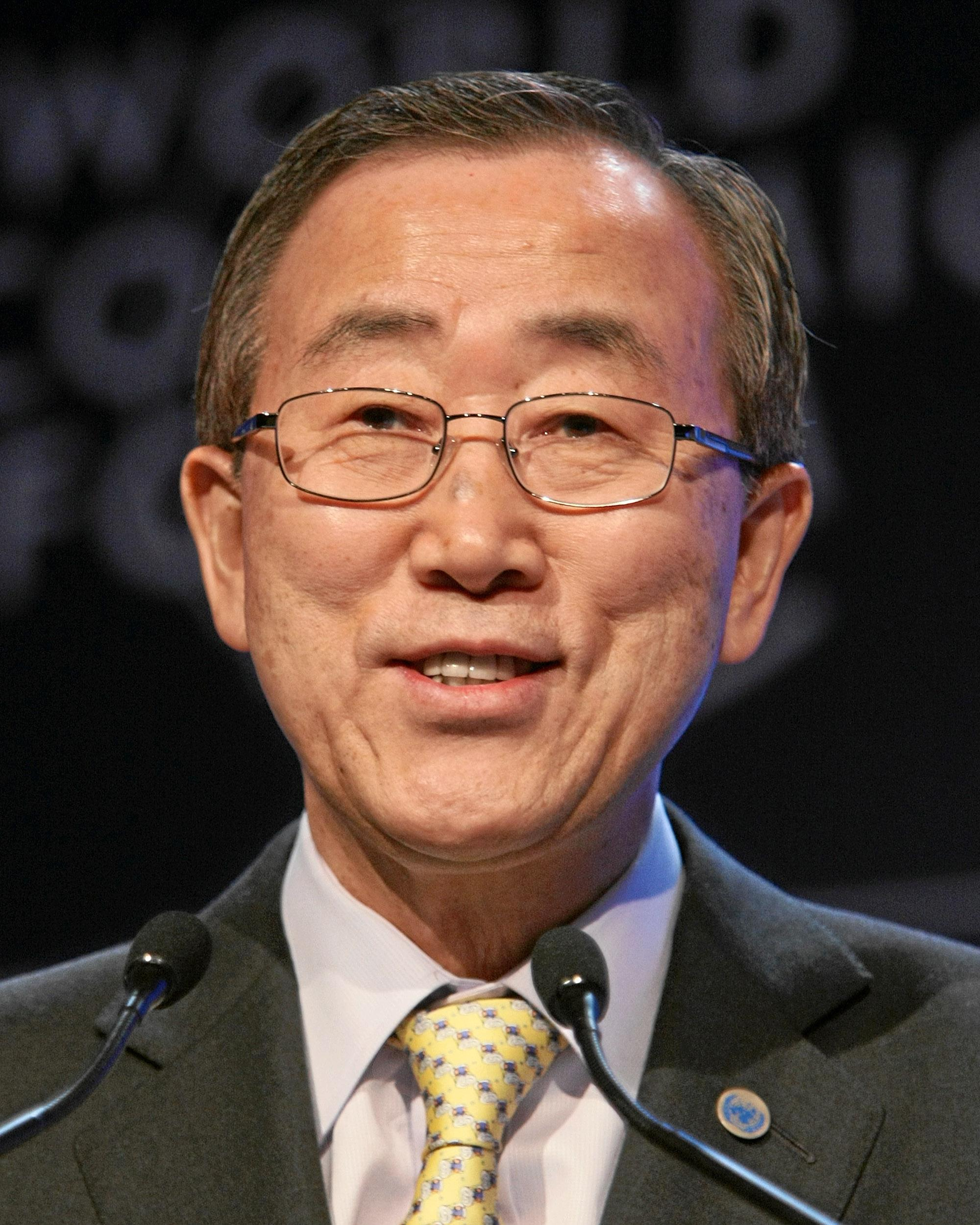
- Ban Ki-moon
- Date: 17 June 2011
- Meeting no.: 6,556
- Code: S/RES/1987 (Document)
- Subject: Recommendation regarding the appointment of the Secretary-General
- Result: Adopted

Security Council composition
- Permanent members: China; France; Russia; United Kingdom; United States
- Non-permanent members: Bosnia–Herzegovina; Brazil; Colombia; Germany; Gabon; India; Lebanon; Nigeria; Portugal; South Africa

United Nations Security Council Resolution 1987, adopted by acclamation at a closed meeting on June 17, 2011, having considered the question of the recommendation for the appointment of the Secretary-General of the United Nations, the Council recommended to the General Assembly that Mr. Ban Ki-moon be appointed for a second term of office from January 1, 2012, to December 31, 2016.

Ban's election was uncontested and nations had approved of his decision immediately. The vote was delayed due to disagreements in the Latin American and Caribbean regional grouping over whether to endorse Ban as he was the sole candidate. Support for his re-election was also given unofficially by North Korea.

His appointment was subsequently endorsed by the General Assembly.

== See also ==
- List of United Nations Security Council Resolutions 1901 to 2000 (2009 – 2011)
- United Nations Security Council Resolution 1358 (2001)
- United Nations Security Council Resolution 2580 (2021)
