= Stanoje Simić =

Yugoslav diplomat

- Станоје Симић
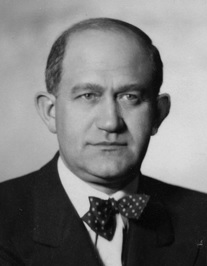

Minister of Foreign Affairs of the FPR Yugoslavia
- In office 1 February 1946 – 31 August 1948
- President: Ivan Ribar
- Prime Minister: Josip Broz Tito
- Preceded by: Josip Broz Tito (acting)
- Succeeded by: Edvard Kardelj

Personal details
- Born: 29 July 1893 Belgrade, Kingdom of Serbia
- Died: 26 February 1970 (aged 76) Belgrade, SR Serbia, SFR Yugoslavia
- Resting place: Belgrade New Cemetery
- Party: League of Communists of Yugoslavia
- Education: University of Belgrade Faculty of Law

Stanoje Simić (Serbian Cyrillic: Станоје Симић; 29 July 1893 – 26 February 1970) was a Serbian lawyer, politician and diplomat who was the Minister for Foreign Affairs of the Federal People's Republic of Yugoslavia and the Yugoslav Ambassador to the United States. In January 1946, he was the Soviet candidate to become the first Secretary General of the United Nations, but was opposed by the United States. The two eventually compromised in the Norwegian socialist Trygve Lie for the position.
