= United Nations Security Council Resolution 1358 =

UN Security Council Resolution 1358
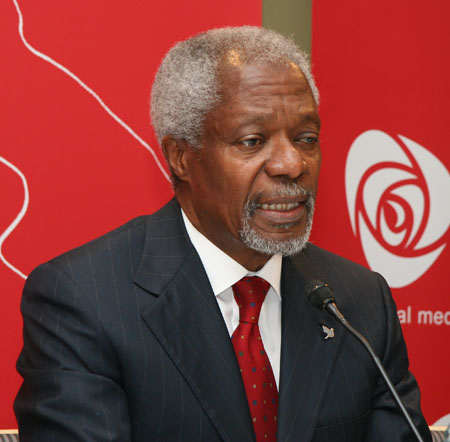
- Kofi Annan
- Date: 27 June 2001
- Meeting no.: 4,337
- Code: S/RES/1358 (Document)
- Subject: Recommendation regarding the appointment of the Secretary-General
- Result: Adopted

Security Council composition
- Permanent members: China; France; Russia; United Kingdom; United States
- Non-permanent members: Bangladesh; Colombia; Ireland; Jamaica; Mali; Mauritius; Norway; Singapore; Tunisia; Ukraine

United Nations Security Council resolution 1358, adopted by acclamation at a closed meeting on 27 June 2001, having considered the question of the recommendation for the appointment of the Secretary-General of the United Nations, the Council recommended to the General Assembly that Mr. Kofi Annan be appointed for a second term of office from 1 January 2002, to 31 December 2006.

Annan's election was uncontested as he had declared his intention to run for Secretary-General in March 2001 and nations had approved of his decision immediately. His appointment was subsequently endorsed by the General Assembly.

== See also ==
- List of United Nations Security Council Resolutions 1301 to 1400 (2000–2002)
- United Nations Security Council Resolution 1987 (2011)
- United Nations Security Council Resolution 2580 (2021)
