= Sixth session of the United Nations General Assembly =

- 6 November 1951 – 13 October 1952 6th session 6th general debate
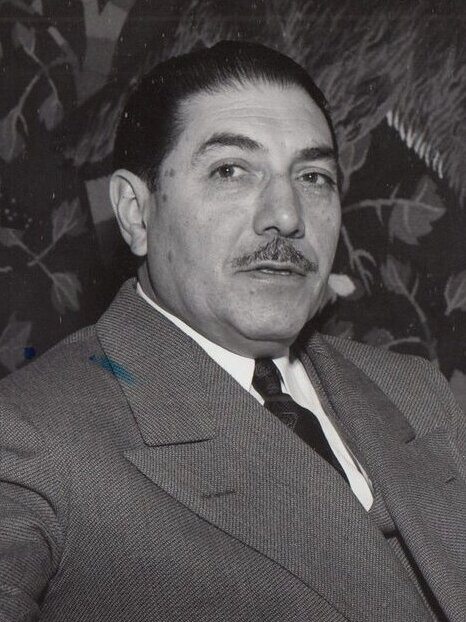
- President of the 6th General Assembly, Luis Padilla Nervo
- Host country: United Nations
- Participants: United Nations Member States
- President: Luis Padilla Nervo
- Secretary-General: Trygve Lie

The sixth session of the United Nations General Assembly opened on 6 November 1951 at the Palais de Chaillot in Paris. The president was Luis Padilla Nervo, previously head of the Mexican delegation to the UN since its first session and later the Secretary of Foreign Affairs of Mexico.

It was the last session held outside the Headquarters of the United Nations in Manhattan.

The first matter of international politics on the agenda was the Unification of Korea

== See also ==
- List of UN General Assembly sessions
- List of General debates of the United Nations General Assembly
