= 1946 United Nations Secretary-General selection =

Selection of Trygve Lie

- 20 January 1946 – 29 January 1946
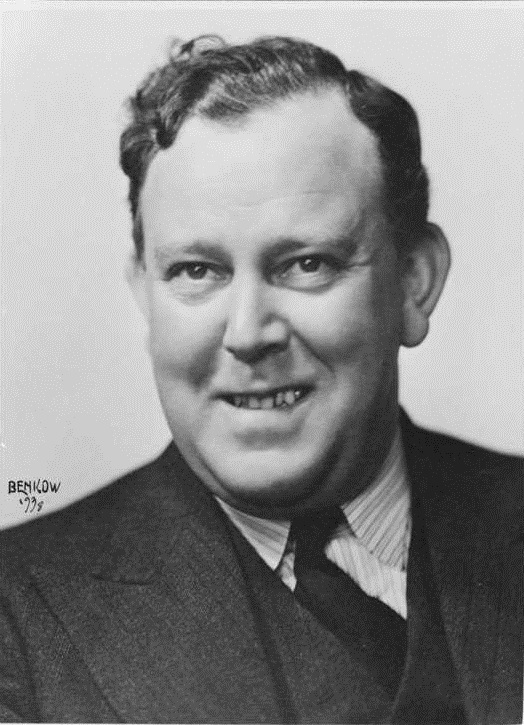

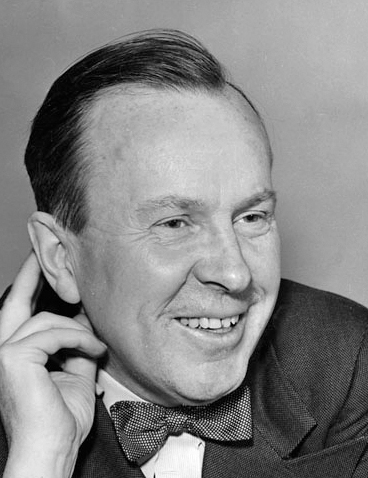
| Candidate | Trygve Lie | Lester B. Pearson |
| Country | Norway | Canada |
| Vote | 11 / 11 | No formal vote |
| Vetoes | None | (Soviet Union) |
| Round | 29 January 1946 | 29 January 1946 |
Elected UN Secretary-General
Trygve Lie

The United Nations Secretary-General selection of 1946 took place at the opening session of the United Nations in London. The General Assembly first voted on the membership of the Security Council, which then selected the first Secretary-General of the United Nations. The United States and the United Kingdom supported Lester B. Pearson of Canada for Secretary-General, but the Soviet Union opposed Pearson since the permanent headquarters of the United Nations would be in North America. The Security Council compromised on Trygve Lie of Norway, who had lost the election for President of the General Assembly to Paul-Henri Spaak of Belgium.

== Background ==
The Secretary-General of the United Nations is appointed by the General Assembly on the recommendation of the Security Council. However, the United Nations Charter provides little guidance for the appointment process.

== President of the General Assembly ==
The Secretary-Generalship was initially overshadowed by the Presidency of the General Assembly. Trygve Lie of Norway and Paul-Henri Spaak of Belgium were the leading candidates for the Presidency. The United States and the Soviet Union favored Lie, but the other permanent members preferred Spaak. After discovering that Adlai Stevenson had picked Trygve Lie and approached the Norwegian and Soviet ambassadors to gain their support, U.S. Secretary of State James F. Byrnes decided that the United States had to vote for Lie to avoid "break[ing] faith with two governments." Although Byrnes thought that Lie's candidacy was hopeless, several Latin American countries decided to switch sides and vote with the United States.

When the General Assembly opened on 10 January 1946, the Soviet Union nominated Lie and attempted to elect him by acclamation. After this maneuver was rejected, the General Assembly proceeded to vote by secret ballot. In the confusion, Spaak's supporters forgot to enter a formal nomination. Nevertheless, Paul-Henri Spaak defeated Trygve Lie for President of the General Assembly in a vote of 28–23.

== Candidates ==
Candidates for Secretary-General
| Image | Candidate | Position | Regional group |
| | (France) Henri Bonnet | Ambassador of France to the United States | Western Europe |
| | (Netherlands) Eelco van Kleffens | Foreign Minister of the Netherlands | Western Europe |
| | (Norway) Trygve Lie | Foreign Minister of Norway | Western Europe |
| | (Canada) Lester B. Pearson | Ambassador of Canada to the United States | British Commonwealth |
| | (Poland) Wincenty Rzymowski | Foreign Minister of Poland | Eastern Europe and Asia |
| | (Socialist Federal Republic of Yugoslavia) Stanoje Simić | Ambassador of Yugoslavia to the United States | Eastern Europe and Asia |

== Consultations ==
After the General Assembly elected the non-permanent members of the Security Council on 12 January 1946, attention turned to the Secretary-Generalship. The British government favored U.S. General Dwight D. Eisenhower, but Eisenhower turned down the nomination. The United States felt that "no national of the Big Five should be selected for the post."

The United States had favored Spaak for Secretary-General, with Alger Hiss noting that his only shortcoming was that he could not speak English. Although the State Department would be "delighted" with Lester B. Pearson of Canada, it felt that the Secretary-General would have to be "non-American" since the permanent UN headquarters would be in the United States. However, Spaak was only willing to serve as President of the General Assembly, and his election as president took him out of the running for Secretary-General.

The permanent members met for informal consultations on 20 January 1946. U.S. Secretary of State James Byrnes nominated Lester B. Pearson, the Canadian Ambassador to the United States. Soviet ambassador Andrei Gromyko opposed Pearson on the basis of geography, nominating Stanoje Simic, the Yugoslav Ambassador to the United States. France then nominated its own Ambassador to the United States, Henri Bonnet. China and the United Kingdom supported Pearson. At an informal consultation of the full Security Council on 21 January 1946, three Foreign Ministers were added to the list of candidates: Wincenty Rzymowski of Poland, Trygve Lie of Norway, Eelco van Kleffens of the Netherlands.

At an informal consultation of the permanent members on 23 January 1946, French delegate Joseph Paul-Boncour advocated for selecting a foreign minister instead of an ambassador. He felt that Trygve Lie, the Norwegian Foreign Minister, would be a good choice except that he could not speak French. None of the other countries changed their positions. The permanent members decided to hold another consultation of the full Security Council and then vote, even if it resulted in a veto. Meanwhile, the General Assembly established a 5-year term with the possibility of appointment to another 5-year term.

Since a Soviet veto of Pearson was expected, the U.S. delegation debated whether Trygve Lie was an acceptable alternative. Eleanor Roosevelt, and John G. Townsend Jr. felt that Lie would be independent of the Soviet Union. However, Arthur Vandenberg was "not impressed" and felt that the defeated Soviet candidate for President of the General Assembly would be "getting a better job." John Foster Dulles said that Lie had once "cast a vote because of the presence of Russian troops on Norway's border." Vandenberg and Dulles felt that Lie "would not dare to be a free agent." Although the United States still preferred Pearson, U.S. Ambassador to the U.N. Edward Stettinius Jr. was "authorized to vote for Mr. Lie in case of an emergency."

On 28 January 1946, the permanent members met again for informal consultations. France remained opposed to Lie on the grounds of his inability to speak French. The Soviet Union remained opposed to Pearson, but the Soviet delegate offered to vote for Lie on his own responsibility. After China agreed to accept Lie in place of Pearson, the French delegate changed his mind. The British delegate then stated that he was bound by instructions from the government, but he would not veto Lie. The Soviets had previously argued for Poland and Yugoslavia on the grounds of their occupation by Germany during World War II. Conveniently, Norway had also been occupied by Germany.

== Vote ==
On 29 January 1946, the Security Council voted unanimously to recommend Trygvie Lie to the General Assembly. On 1 February 1946, the General Assembly ratified the appointment with three dissenting votes. Lie took office on 2 February 1946.
