= Mexicans in Paraguay =

Mexicanos en paraguay (Spanish)

Total population
- 1,805

Languages
- Spanish

Religion
- Roman Catholicism

The presence of Mexican citizens in Paraguay is strongly linked to the immigration of Mennonites in Mexico.

== See also ==
- Mexico–Paraguay relations
