= 2006 United Nations Secretary-General selection =

Selection of Ban Ki-Moon

- 24 July 2006 – 2 October 2006
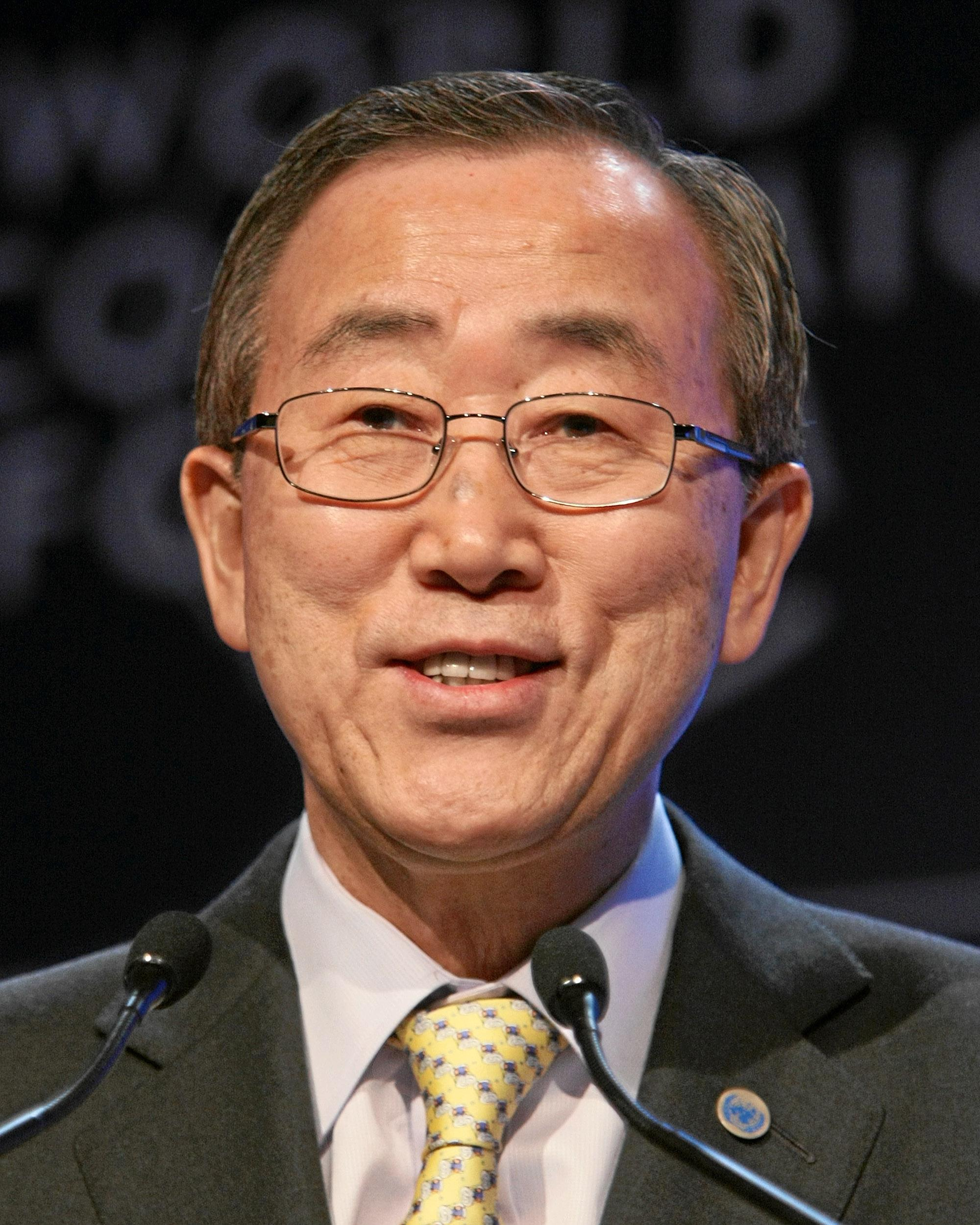

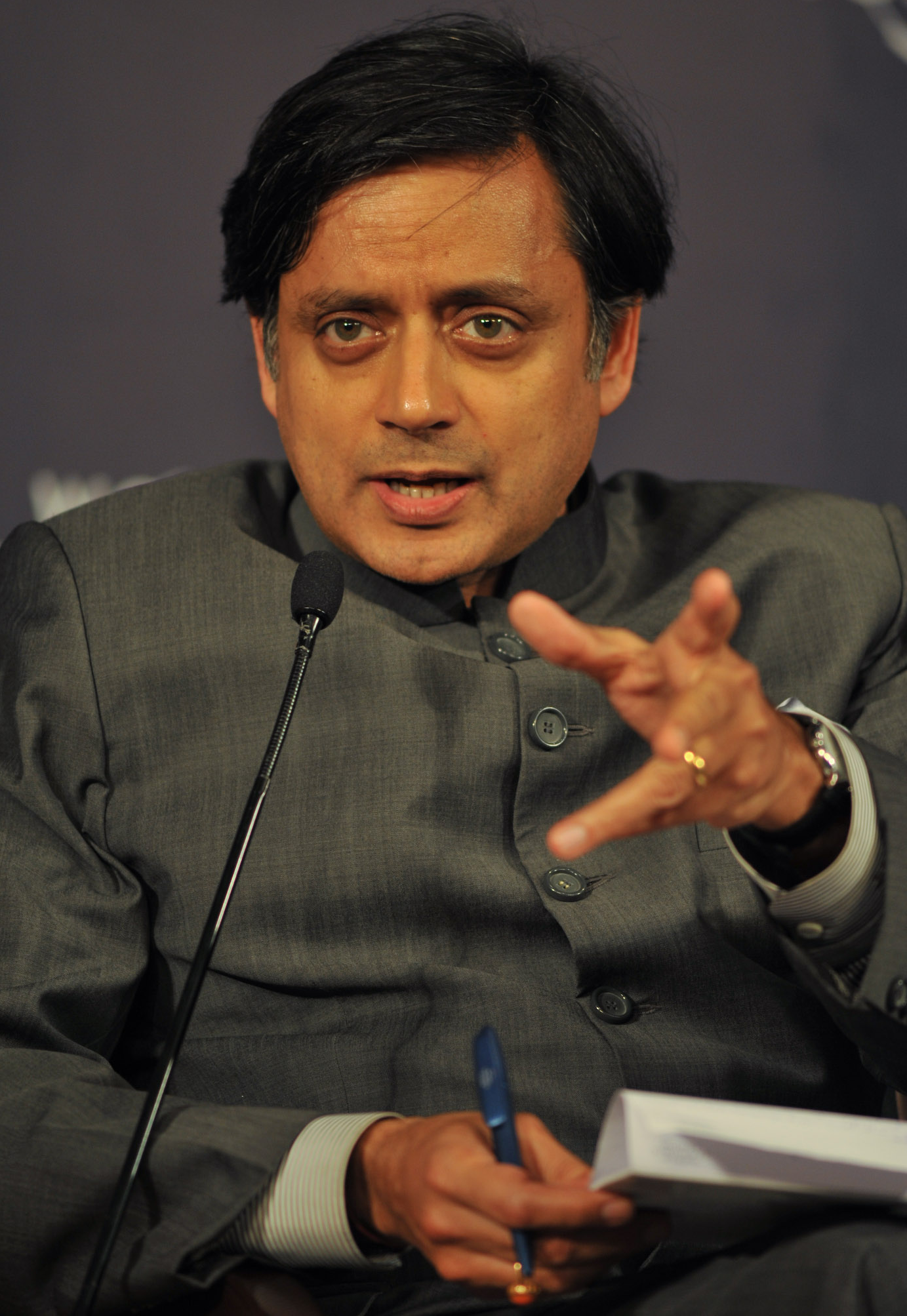

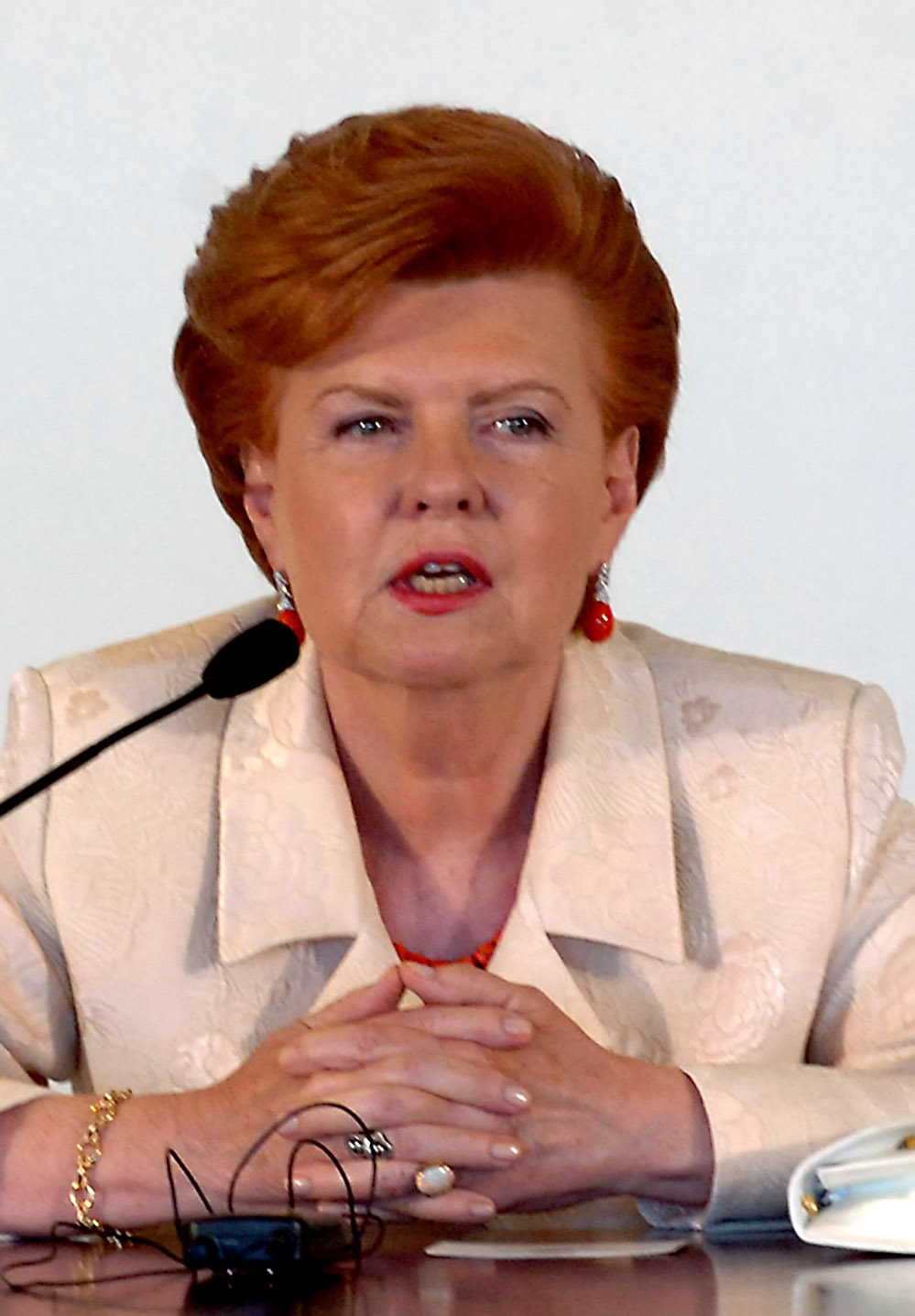
Candidate	Ban Ki-moon	Shashi Tharoor	Vaira Vīķe-Freiberga
Country	South Korea	India	Latvia
Votes to encourage	14 / 15	10 / 15	5 / 15
P5 votes to discourage	None	1 / 5	2 / 5
UN Secretary-General before election
Kofi Annan
Elected UN Secretary-General
Ban Ki-moon

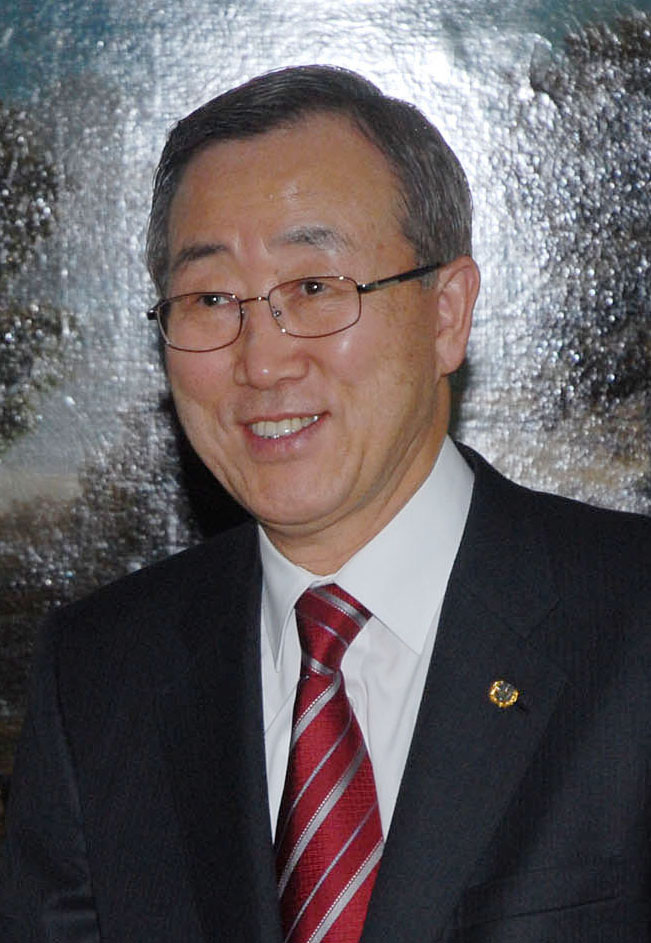
Ban Ki-moon was elected Secretary-General in October 2006.

A United Nations Secretary-General selection was held in 2006 to succeed Kofi Annan, whose second term as Secretary-General of the United Nations ran until 31 December 2006. Seven candidates were officially nominated for the position.

The United Nations Security Council conducted a series of unofficial straw polls between 24 July and 2 October. South Korean Foreign Minister Ban Ki-moon led the polls from the start, emerging as the only candidate with the support of all five veto-wielding permanent members of the Security Council (P5). After the final straw poll, all of the other candidates withdrew. The Security Council conducted a formal vote on 9 October and forwarded its choice to the General Assembly, which elected Ban on 13 October.

== Selection process ==
The United Nations Charter provides for the Secretary-General to be appointed by the General Assembly upon the nomination of the Security Council. Therefore, the selection is subject to the veto of any of the five permanent members of the Security Council.

The Charter's minimal language has since been supplemented by other procedural rules and accepted practices. There is an unofficial term limit of two full terms, disqualifying Kofi Annan from re-selection. A system of regional rotation is in place to select a new Secretary-General after the previous one has served two terms. The ability of a candidate to converse in both English and French is also considered an advantage, although this is not always enforced.

The Security Council conducts a series of straw polls in private to gauge the level of support for each candidate. When a candidate appears to be winning, another straw poll is taken to reveal vetoes. The candidate with no vetoes, at least 9 votes, and more votes than the other candidates is considered to be the most likely choice. The Security Council then takes a formal public vote to announce its choice, and the General Assembly votes to accept the Security Council's recommendation.

== Background ==
When the race to succeed Annan began in 2006, it was widely expected that the successful candidate would be Asian, as there had not been a Secretary-General from Asia since 1971. A number of Security Council members (including China, which has a veto) indicated they would only support an Asian candidate.

Noting that all Secretaries-General to date have been men, Equality Now launched a campaign for the election of a female Secretary-General, and identified a ‘sampling’ of 18 qualified women, including Vaira Vīķe-Freiberga, Louise Arbour, Gro Harlem Brundtland, and Tarja Halonen. Equality Now also noted that there are many qualified Asian women, including Aung San Suu Kyi from Burma, Sadako Ogata from Japan, Nafis Sadik from Pakistan, Anson Chan from Hong Kong, and Leticia Shahani from the Philippines. The idea of a female Secretary-General received some support, (including from Kofi Annan and US Ambassador to the UN John Bolton), but no Asian women were nominated.

== Nominees ==
Seven candidates were officially nominated for the position:

Official candidates
Image	Candidate	Position	Nominated by	Regional group
	Ban Ki-moon	Minister of Foreign Affairs and Trade of South Korea	South Korea	Asian Group
	Shashi Tharoor	Under-Secretary General for Communications and Public Information	India	Asian Group
	Vaira Vīķe-Freiberga	President of Latvia	Estonia; Latvia; Lithuania	Eastern European Group (EEG)
	Surakiart Sathirathai	Deputy Prime Minister of Thailand	Thailand	Asian Group
	Ashraf Ghani	Chancellor of the Kabul University	Afghanistan	Asian Group
	Prince Zeid bin Ra'ad	Jordanian Ambassador to the United Nations	Jordan	Asian Group
	Jayantha Dhanapala	Former Under Secretary General to re-establish the Department of Disarmament	Sri Lanka	Asian Group

A number of other potential candidates were mentioned by commentators but did not run, including Bill Clinton (former President of the United States), Jean Chrétien (former Prime Minister of Canada), Anwar Ibrahim (former Deputy Prime Minister of Malaysia), Goh Chok Tong (Senior Minister of Singapore), Fidel Ramos (former President of the Philippines), José Ramos-Horta (Prime Minister of East Timor), Aleksander Kwaśniewski (former President of Poland), and Tony Blair (then Prime Minister of the United Kingdom). However, Bill Clinton and Tony Blair did not qualify for the post, since one of the unofficial rules of the selection process is that a citizen of a permanent member could not hold the position.

== Selection ==
The Security Council conducted four straw polls, on 24 July, 14 September, 28 September, and 2 October, in which each of the 15 member states were asked whether they would "encourage" or "discourage" each of the official candidates (or if they had ‘no opinion’ on the candidate). Ban Ki-moon led all of the polls, and Shashi Tharoor came in second.

In the final poll, the permanent members voted on red paper, while the rotating members voted on white paper. Ban was the only candidate not to be vetoed, while Tharoor received one red "discourage" vote from the United States. After the vote, Shashi Tharoor withdrew his candidacy, and China's Permanent Representative to the UN told reporters that "it is quite clear from today's straw poll that Minister Ban Ki-moon is the candidate that the Security Council will recommend to the General Assembly".

Zeid and Ghani withdrew from the race on 4 October. They were followed on 5 October by Surakiart and Vīķe-Freiberga, leaving only Ban in the race. The Security Council conducted a formal vote on 9 October and forwarded its choice to the General Assembly, which then appointed Ban Ki-moon on 13 October.

United Nations Secretary-General selection straw poll results
Candidate	24 July			14 September			28 September			2 October			Final Vote
Candidate	E	D	N	E	D	N	E	D	N	E	D	N	Final Vote
(South Korea) Ban Ki-moon	12	1	2	14	1	0	13	1	1	14	0	1	Acclaimed
(India) Shashi Tharoor	10	2	3	10	3	2	8	3	4	10	3 (1P)	2	Withdrawn
(Thailand) Surakiart Sathirathai	7	3	5	9	3	3	5	7	3	4	7 (2P)	4	Withdrawn
(Sri Lanka) Jayantha Dhanapala	5	6	4	3	5	7	3	7	5	Withdrawn			Withdrawn
(Jordan) Prince Zeid bin Ra'ad	Not yet nominated			6	4	5	3	6	6	2	8 (1P)	5	Withdrawn
(Latvia) Vaira Vike-Freiberga	Not yet nominated			Not yet nominated			7	6	2	5	6 (2P)	4	Withdrawn
(Afghanistan) Ashraf Ghani	Not yet nominated			Not yet nominated			3	6	6	4	11 (3P)	0	Withdrawn

== 2011 re-selection ==
Traditionally, the Secretary-General is re-selected for a second term unless vetoed by a permanent member. Ban Ki-moon ran unopposed for a second term in 2011. The Security Council met for informal consultations on 16 June 2011, where Ban received no vetoes. The Security Council adopted Resolution 1987 by acclamation on 17 June 2011, recommending Ban for a second term ending 31 December 2016. The General Assembly adopted Resolution 65/282 on 21 June 2011, ratifying Ban's re-appointment.

== See also ==
- Reform of the United Nations
- United Nations General Assembly
- United Nations Security Council
