= 1953 United Nations Secretary-General selection =

Selection of Dag Hammarskjöld

- 13 March 1953 – 31 March 1953
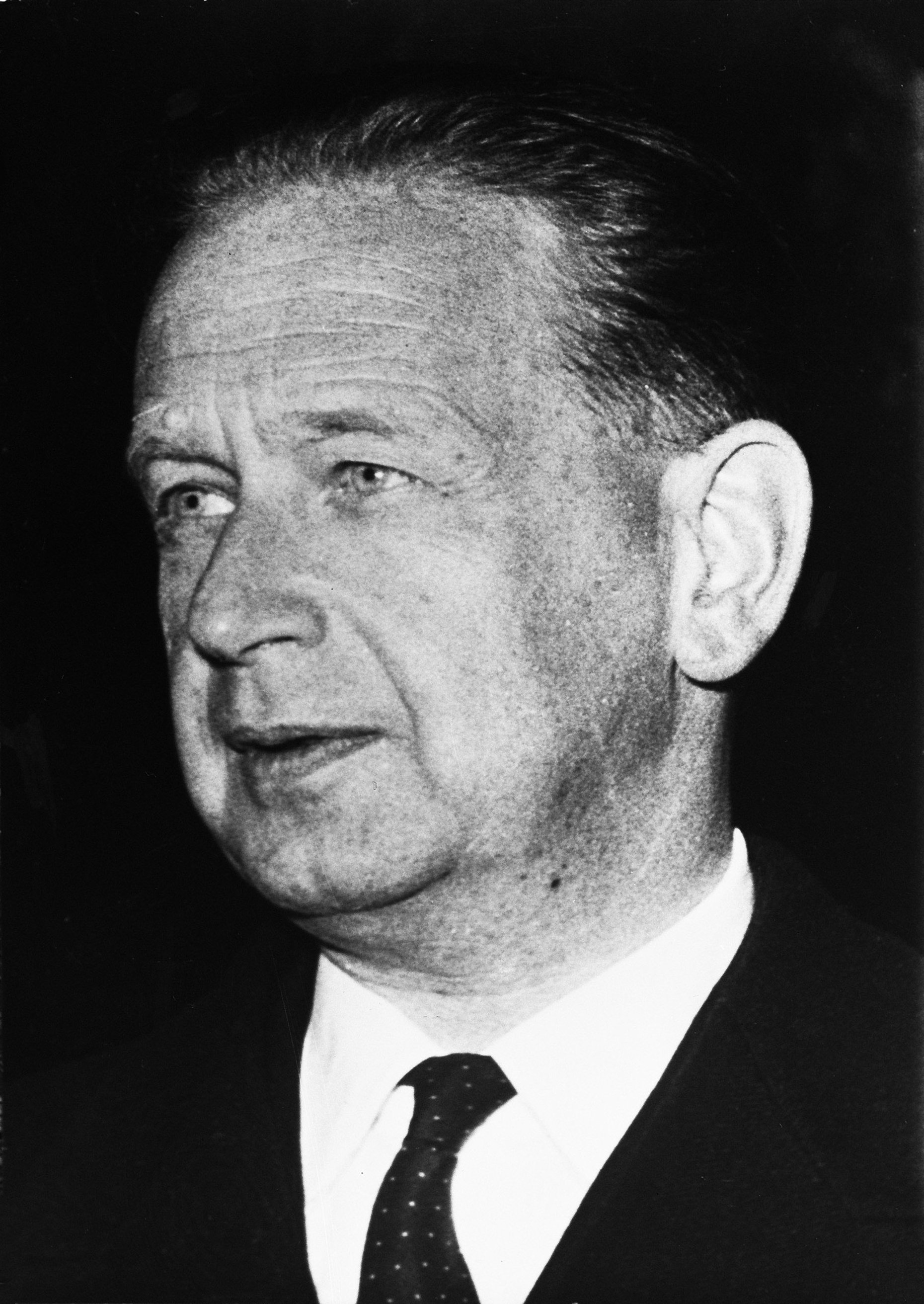

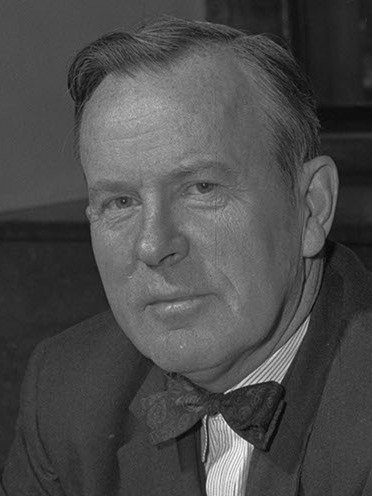

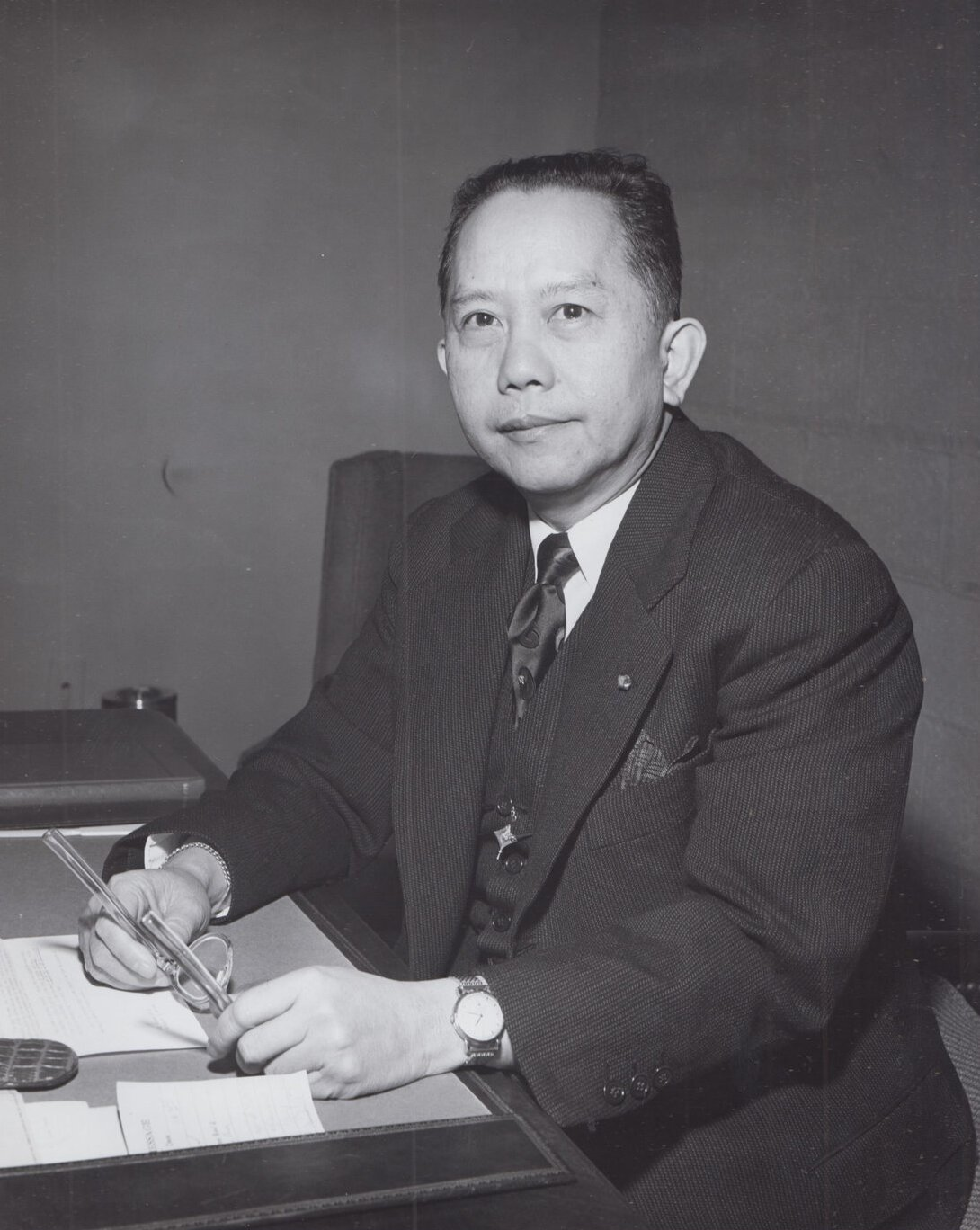
Candidate	Dag Hammarskjöld	Lester B. Pearson	Carlos P. Romulo
Country	Sweden	Canada	Philippines
Vote	10 / 11	9 / 11	5 / 11
Vetoes	None	(Soviet Union)	(France) (Soviet Union)
Round	5th vote 31 March 1953	3rd vote 13 March 1953	1st vote 13 March 1953
UN Secretary-General before election
Trygve Lie
Elected UN Secretary-General
Dag Hammarskjöld

A United Nations Secretary-General selection was held in 1953 after Trygve Lie announced his intention of resigning. Lie had been at odds with the Soviet Union since the outbreak of the Korean War, and the negotiations for an armistice offered the opportunity for a new Secretary-General to turn the page. The British delegation dragged out the selection process as they campaigned for Lester Pearson of Canada, but he was vetoed by the Soviet Union. Other candidates fell short of a majority in the Security Council. After two weeks of deadlock, France proposed Dag Hammarskjöld of Sweden as a dark horse candidate. Hammarskjöld was acceptable to both superpowers and was selected Secretary-General for a 5-year term.

Hammarskjöld subsequently ran unopposed for re-selection in 1957 and was unanimously appointed to a second term.

== Background ==
The Secretary-General of the United Nations is appointed by the General Assembly on the recommendation of the Security Council. When the United Nations met in 1946, it was agreed that the Security Council would select one candidate for the General Assembly's approval. The United States had backed Lester Pearson of Canada, while the Soviet Union supported Stanoje Simic of Yugoslavia. Since neither superpower would accept the other's candidate, they compromised on Trygve Lie of Norway, who became the first Secretary-General of the United Nations.

In the late 1940s, international tensions affected the workings of the United Nations. Norway joined the North Atlantic Treaty Organization in 1949, placing the post of Secretary-General in the hands of a country that was aligned with one side in the Cold War. Lie took the United Nations into the Korean War in 1950, leading the Soviet Union to veto his re-selection in 1950. The United States then announced that it would veto every other candidate. With the Security Council unable to break the Soviet-American veto duel, the General Assembly extended Lie's term to 1954. The Soviet Union subsequently treated Lie as an illegitimate office-holder, addressing all communications to "The Secretariat" rather than the Secretary-General.

On 10 November 1952, Lie announced his resignation, declaring in a speech to the General Assembly, "I am quite sure that this is the time to leave without damage to the UN." The Korean War had reached a stalemate, and armistice talks had begun. Lie felt that his successor "may be more helpful than I can be" in concluding the armistice. However, if a successor could not be found, Lie was willing to serve out the rest of his term.

At the time of Lie's resignation, all five permanent members were represented by their foreign ministers in New York. Nationalist China held the rotating Presidency of the Security Council, but the Soviet Union had a policy of boycotting informal meetings where Nationalist China was present. Although U.S. Secretary of State Dean Acheson agreed with Soviet Foreign Minister Andrei Gromyko that informal consultations should be held, Acheson declined to take the initiative to avoid usurping Nationalist China's role.

== Candidates ==
Candidates for Secretary-General
Image	Candidate	Position	Regional group
	(Sweden) Erik Boheman	Ambassador of Sweden to the United States	Western Europe
	(Iran) Nasrollah Entezam	Former President of the U.N. General Assembly (1950)	Middle East
	(Mexico) Luis Padilla Nervo	Foreign Minister of Mexico; President of the U.N. General Assembly (1951)	Latin America
	(Canada) Lester B. Pearson	Canadian Secretary of State for External Affairs; President of the U.N. General Assembly (1952)	British Commonwealth
	(Philippines) Carlos P. Romulo	Ambassador of the Philippines to the United States	Asia

== Campaign ==
Lester B. Pearson of Canada had been a leading contender for Secretary-General in 1946, and the United Kingdom launched an intense campaign on his behalf. British ambassador Gladwyn Jebb declared to Dean Acheson that the United Kingdom would veto anyone except Pearson or Erik Boheman of Sweden. France also regarded Pearson as their first choice. The British delegation had instructions from London to delay the selection until February 1953, when the General Assembly would reconvene after its holiday recess.

On 20 January 1953, Dwight Eisenhower succeeded Harry S. Truman as President of the United States, with John Foster Dulles as his Secretary of State. The United States offered to vote for Pearson if the British would vote for an American candidate in case of a Soviet veto. The Canadians were "upset" that the British were throwing around Pearson's name so casually, and the Canadian delegation respected Pearson's wishes by not campaigning for him. Pearson was the heir-apparent to be Prime Minister of Canada, but he had a deep interest in the United Nations and very much wanted the job.

Carlos P. Romulo of the Philippines was the leading candidate from Asia. Although the United States supported Romulo, it did not conduct a vigorous campaign on his behalf.

Nasrollah Entezam of Iran was the leading candidate from the Middle East. France considered Entezam to be their second choice after Lester Pearson. The Soviet Union also selected Entezam as their second choice, after Stanisław Skrzeszewski of Poland. British ambassador Gladwyn Jebb admitted that he was a capable candidate, but he repeatedly announced that the United Kingdom would veto Entezam. British opposition to Entezam was motivated by Iran's nationalization of the Anglo-Persian Oil Company in 1951.

The United States approached the Swedish government to determine if Erik Boheman was willing to run for Secretary-General, since the British had threatened to veto anyone except Pearson or Boheman. However, Boheman declined and stated that the Soviet Union probably would not accept him. Nevertheless, if Boheman was the only candidate to avoid a Soviet veto, then the Swedish government was willing to press him to reconsider.

== Voting ==
United Nations Secretary-General selection results, 1953
Date	Vote	Candidate	For	Against	Abstain	Vetoes
13 March	1	(Philippines) Carlos P. Romulo	5	2	4	(France) (Soviet Union)
13 March	2	(Poland) Stanisław Skrzeszewski	1	3	7	(France) (United Kingdom) (United States)
13 March	3	(Canada) Lester B. Pearson	9	1	1	(Soviet Union)
19 March	4	(India) Vijaya Lakshmi Pandit	2	1	8	(Taiwan)
30 March	5	(Sweden) Dag Hammarskjöld	10	0	1	None

On 2 March 1953, Gladwyn Jebb announced that he would be calling a meeting of the Security Council the following week. Jebb claimed that Pearson was the only candidate who could win the necessary 7 votes in the Security Council. U.S. Ambassador Henry Cabot Lodge warned Jebb about calling for a vote on Pearson only to be vetoed. However, Jebb felt that Pearson might win on the second round if the other candidates were also vetoed. The Soviet delegation had hinted that they might accept Pearson if there were no other choice.

Soviet Premier Joseph Stalin died on 5 March 1953. Soviet Foreign Minister Andrey Vyshinsky left New York for Moscow, but the selection process continued. On 12 March 1953, France, the United Kingdom, and the United States met to discuss their tactics for the upcoming meeting of the Security Council. The United States expressed its support for Romulo. However, French ambassador Henri Hoppenot objected to Romulo because of his unfavorable attitude towards the French colonial empire.

=== First round ===
On 13 March 1953, the Security Council met and voted successively on three candidates. First, Carlos P. Romulo fell short with a vote of 5–2–4. The Soviet Union and France both voted against Romulo, while the United Kingdom, Chile, Denmark, and Pakistan abstained. Next, Stanisław Skrzeszewski was rejected with a vote of 1–3–7. The Soviet Union was the only vote in favor, while France, the United Kingdom, and the United States all voted against. Finally, Lester Pearson won a favorable vote of 9-1-1. However, the Soviet Union vetoed Pearson, and Lebanon abstained.

The United States had supported Romulo because of its close ties with the Philippines, which had only become independent from the United States in 1946. Romulo claimed that he would be elected if the Soviet Union were forced to choose between him and Lie, but Dulles was noncommittal. U.S. failure to advance Romulo's candidacy was criticized by Filipino newspapers, which accused the United States of "snubbing" and "double crossing" their candidate. However, Romulo's failure to win 7 votes and his veto by France made it unlikely that he could win, even if the Soviets agreed to withdraw their veto.

=== Second round ===
On 17 March 1953, the Soviet Union suggested Vijaya Lakshmi Pandit and Benegal Rama Rau of India for the Secretary-Generalship. The nomination of two Indians was calculated to force the Western powers to cast an embarrassing vote against an Asian. However, this became unnecessary when Nationalist China informed the United States that it would veto both candidates, as India recognized Communist China. The U.S. State Department felt that it was "very bad for the United Nations" if an Indian became Secretary-General, since "the problem facing the United Nations now is stopping Communist agression [sic?] and ... this can not be done with the passive resistance advocated by India." U.S. Ambassador Henry Cabot Lodge Jr. was instructed to abstain if possible but authorized to veto if necessary.

The permanent members engaged in consultations on 18 March 1953 and failed to agree on a candidate. However, 9 additional candidates were nominated in addition to the ones that had already been voted on.

The Security Council met again on 19 March 1953. Although the Soviet Union attempted to delay the vote, Pandit was rejected by a vote of 2–1–8. Lebanon and the Soviet Union voted for Pandit, Nationalist China voted against, and the Western powers all abstained. Zorin professed astonishment that the United Kingdom could abstain on a Commonwealth citizen. The Council then asked the permanent members to "continue their consultations" and adjourned.

=== Deadlock ===
The permanent members met for consultations on 23 March 1953 and failed to agree on a candidate. The list of candidates was reduced to six by removing Pandit and two candidates who declined their nominations. The Security Council met on 24 March 1953 and decided to wait for Soviet Ambassador Andrey Vyshinsky to arrive on the RMS Queen Mary. However, Vyshinsky declined to attend the next meeting of the Security Council on 27 March 1953, and the Council did not vote.

=== Third round ===
An unexpected breakthrough occurred at a consultation of the permanent members on 30 March 1953. After the existing candidates were discussed and rejected, French Ambassador Henri Hoppenot suggested two new names: Dirk Stikker of the Netherlands and Dag Hammarskjöld of Sweden. To the surprise of the Western powers, Valerian Zorin declared that the Soviet Union was prepared to vote for Hammarskjöld.

U.S. Ambassador Lodge said that he would not veto Hammarskjöld but had to seek instructions from Washington. At the U.S. State Department, the nomination "came as a complete surprise to everyone here and we started scrambling around to find out who Mr. Hammarskjold was and what his qualifications were." After consulting H. Freeman Matthews, former U.S. Ambassador to Sweden, the State Department authorized Lodge to vote for Hammarskjöld. British Foreign Secretary Anthony Eden sent an urgent telegram to Washington, expressing strong support for Hammarskjöld. Eden also asked the United States to "take any appropriate action to induce the Chinese to abstain." A Nationalist Chinese veto was possible because Sweden recognized Communist China.

The Security Council met that afternoon to vote. Hammarskjöld was recommended by a vote of 10–0–1, with Nationalist China abstaining. Just before the meeting, Ambassador Lodge "dragooned" the Latin American delegates into voting for a man whom they had never heard of before. Hammarskjöld was caught by surprise when his phone rang in Stockholm shortly after midnight on 1 April 1953. Upon being told that he had been named the Secretary-General of the United Nations, he replied, "This April Fool's Day joke is in extremely bad taste." He finally believed the news after the third call. After consulting with the Swedish government, he cabled the President of the Security Council, "I do not feel I can refuse the task imposed on me."

On 7 April 1953, the General Assembly voted 57-1-1 to appoint Dag Hammarskjöld Secretary-General of the United Nations for a 5-year term. The negative vote was from Nationalist China, and the abstention may have been a Latin American country. The Swedish ambassador speculated that tensions with Juan Perón caused Argentina to abstain, but others felt that Uruguay abstained to protest the manner in which Hammarskjöld had been rushed through the Security Council without consulting the non-permanent members. U.S. ambassador Lodge attempted to mollify the Latin American countries by explaining that the nomination had happened so fast that there had been no time to consult with them.

== 1957 re-selection ==
Dag Hammarskjöld ran unopposed for re-selection in 1957. Hammarskjöld was recommended unanimously by the Security Council on the morning of 26 September 1957. The General Assembly voted unanimously that afternoon to appoint him for another 5-year term.
