= Mexico–Paraguay relations =

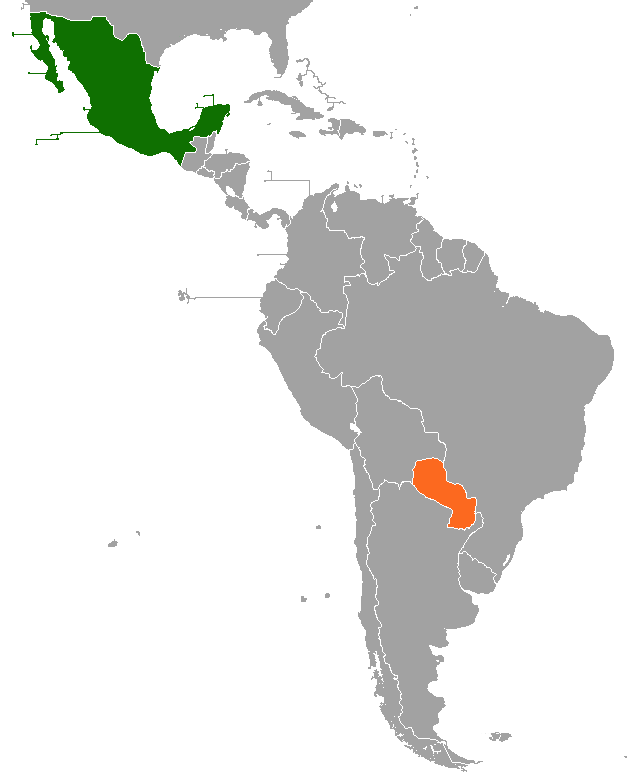

- Mexico: Paraguay

The nations of Mexico and Paraguay established diplomatic relations in 1831. Both countries are full members of the Community of Latin American and Caribbean States, Latin American Integration Association, Organization of American States, Organization of Ibero-American States and the United Nations.

== History ==
Historically, both countries were part of the Spanish Empire until the early 19th century. Mexico was part of the Viceroyalty of New Spain while Paraguay was part of the Viceroyalty of the Río de la Plata. Soon after independence, in 1831, Mexico and Paraguay established diplomatic relations. That same year, Mexico accredited a non-resident embassy concurrent to Paraguay from its embassy in Buenos Aires, Argentina. In 1901, Paraguay established a diplomatic mission in Mexico City with Mexico reciprocating the gesture three years later in 1904. In 1943, both diplomatic missions were elevated to the rank of embassies.

During the presidency of Alfredo Stroessner, Mexico maintained diplomatic relations with Paraguay despite international condemnation of the Paraguayan government. Mexico applied its foreign policy known as the Estrada Doctrine. A few years after the removal of President Stroessner from power; in 1992, Mexican President Carlos Salinas de Gortari paid a state visit to Paraguay, becoming the first Mexican head-of-state to visit Paraguay. In 1997, Paraguayan President Juan Carlos Wasmosy also paid a state visit to Mexico.

In 2003, the 'Mexico-Paraguay Mechanism for Consultation and Coordination' group was created so that both nations meet periodically to analyze joint ongoing projects and discuss future bilateral, economic and mutual projects. In 2016, both nations celebrated 185 years of diplomatic relations.

In September 2021, Paraguayan President Mario Abdo Benítez traveled to Mexico to attend the 6th CELAC summit. While in Mexico, President Abdo Benítez met with President Andrés Manuel López Obrador and the two leaders discussed issues affecting the region.

In October 2024, President Santiago Peña travelled to Mexico to attend the inauguration of President Claudia Sheinbaum.

== High-level visits ==
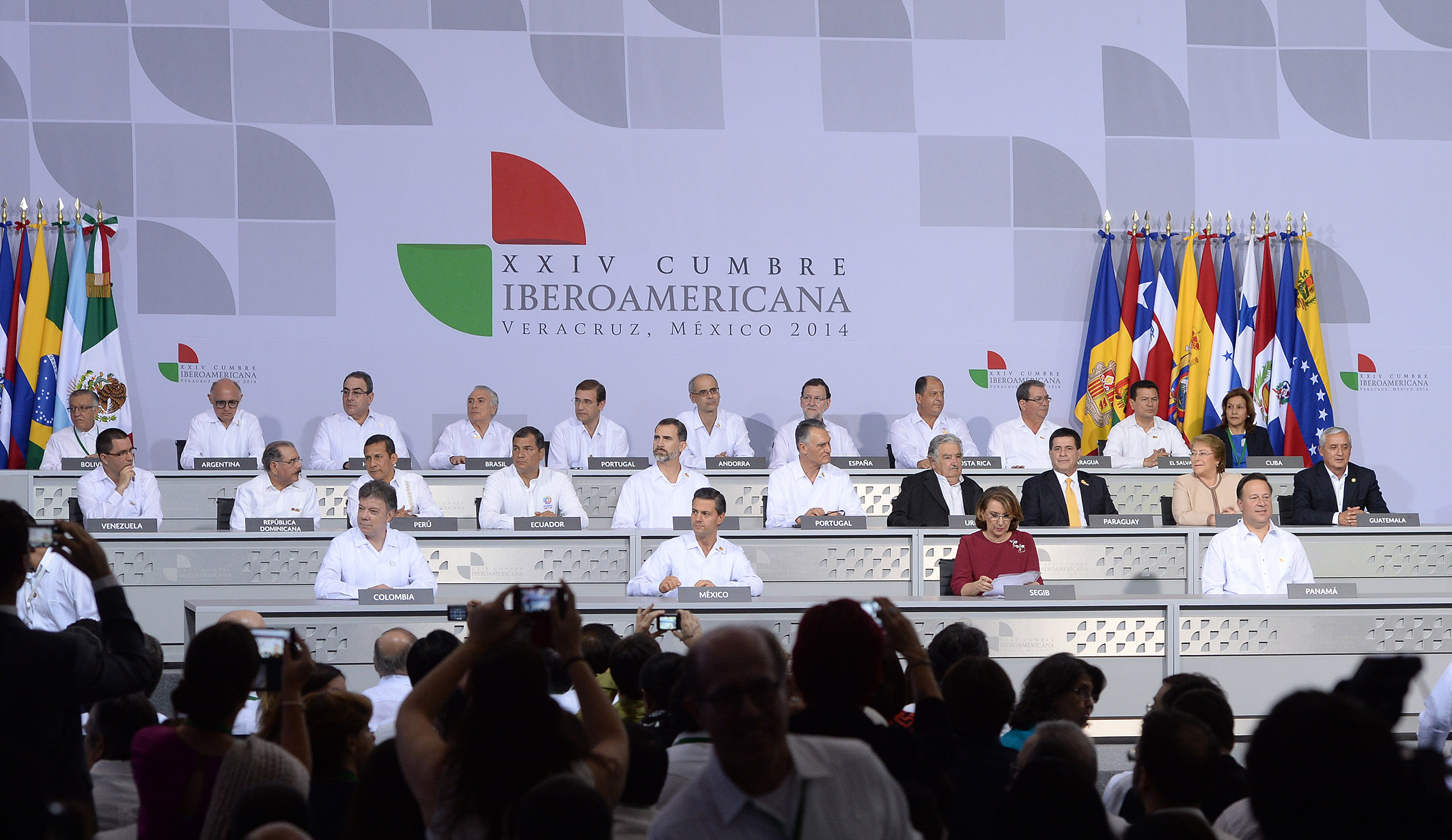
Paraguayan President Horacio Cartes attending the Ibero-American summit in Veracruz, Mexico; 2014

Presidential visits from Mexico to Paraguay

- President Carlos Salinas de Gortari (1992)
- President Ernesto Zedillo (1997)
- President Vicente Fox (2004)
- President Felipe Calderón (2011)
- President Enrique Peña Nieto (2018)

Presidential visits from Paraguay to Mexico

- President Andrés Rodríguez (1991)
- President Juan Carlos Wasmosy (1997)
- President Nicanor Duarte Frutos (2004, 2005)
- President Fernando Lugo (2008, 2010)
- President Horacio Cartes (2014, 2015)
- President Mario Abdo Benítez (2021)
- President Santiago Peña (2024)

== Bilateral agreements ==
Both nations have signed several bilateral agreements such as an Arbitration Agreement (1902); Cultural Agreement (1992); Agreement for Technical and Scientific Cooperation (1992); Agreement of Cooperation between Bancomext and the Paraguayan General Directorate of Promotion of Exports and Investments (1992); Agreement of Cooperation in the fight against Illicit Trafficking and abuse of Narcotic Drugs, Psychotropic Substances, Control of Chemical Precursors and related Crimes (1997); Academic Cooperation between both Foreign Ministries (1997); Agreement for the Suppression of visas in Diplomatic and Official Passports (1997); Treaty on Mutual Legal Assistance Cooperation in Criminal Matters (2005); Extradition Treaty (2005); Agreement on the Mutual Recognition for Degrees, Diplomas and Academic Degrees of Higher Education (2006) and an Agreement on Air Transportation (2007).

== Trade ==
In 2023, two-way trade between both nations amounted to US$179.5 million. Mexico's main exports to Paraguay include: tractors, automobile parts, beer, tequila, cement and machinery. Paraguay's main exports to Mexico include: tung oil, sugar, cassava, fruits and textiles. Mexican multinational companies such as Cemex, Claro and Grupo Bimbo (among others) operate in Paraguay.

== Resident diplomatic missions ==
- Mexico has an embassy in Asunción.
- Paraguay has an embassy in Mexico City.
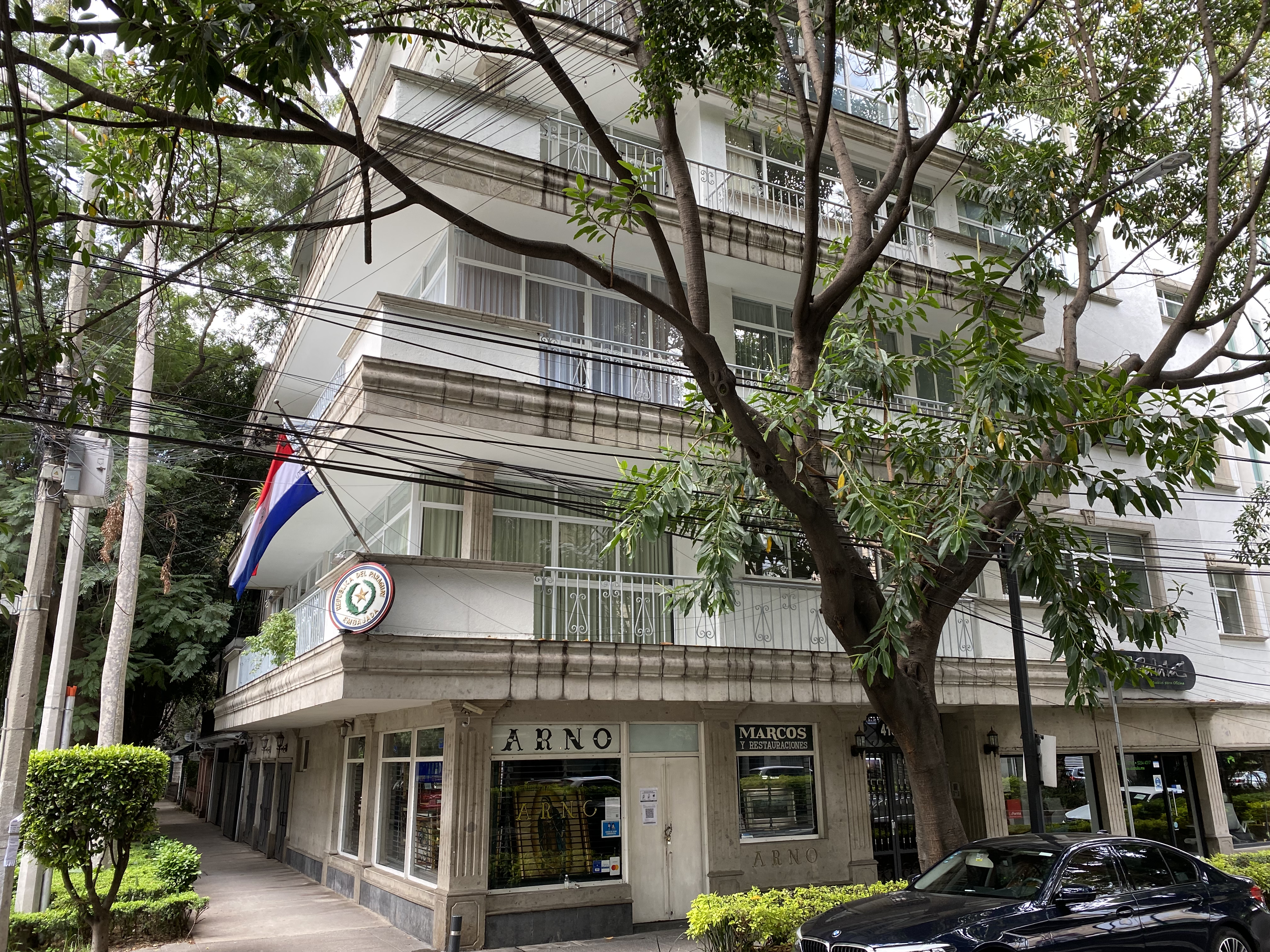
Embassy of Paraguay in Mexico City

== See also ==
- Mexicans in Paraguay
