= Secretary-General of the United Nations =

Head of the United Nations Secretariat

- Other official names: أمين عام الأمم المتحدة (Arabic) 联合国秘书长 (Chinese) Secrétaire Général des Nations Unies (French) Secretario General de las Naciones Unidas (Spanish) Генеральный секретарь ООН (Russian)
- Emblem of the United Nations

- Flag of the United Nations

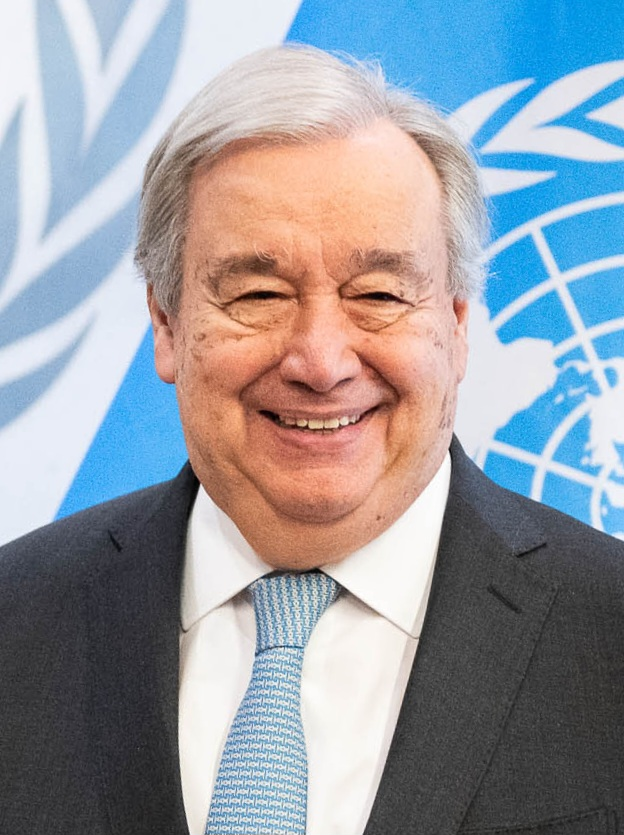
- Incumbent; António Guterres since 1 January 2017
- United Nations Secretariat
- Style: His Excellency
- Type: Chief administrative officer
- Abbreviation: UNSECGEN
- Member of: Secretariat; General Assembly
- Residence: Sutton Place, New York City
- Seat: United Nations Headquarters, New York City (international territory)
- Nominator: Security Council
- Appointer: General Assembly
- Term length: Five years, renewable once
- Constituting instrument: United Nations Charter
- Precursor: Secretary-General of the League of Nations
- Formation: 24 October 1945
- First holder: Gladwyn Jebb as acting Secretary-General; Trygve Lie as first Secretary-General
- Deputy: Deputy Secretary-General
- Salary: $ 227,253 per annum (2024)
- Website: un.org/sg

The secretary-general of the United Nations (UNSG or UNSECGEN) is the de facto head of the United Nations who oversees the United Nations Secretariat, one of the six principal organs of the United Nations, which also represents all 193 nations on the global stage. While the president of the Security Council chairs its meeting, the secretary-general acts as the Security Council's executive officer who oversees the implementation of its decisions and mandates.

The role of the secretary-general and of the secretariat is laid out by Chapter XV (Articles 97 to 101) of the United Nations Charter. However, the office's qualifications, selection process and tenure are open to interpretation; they have been established by custom.

== Selection and term of office ==
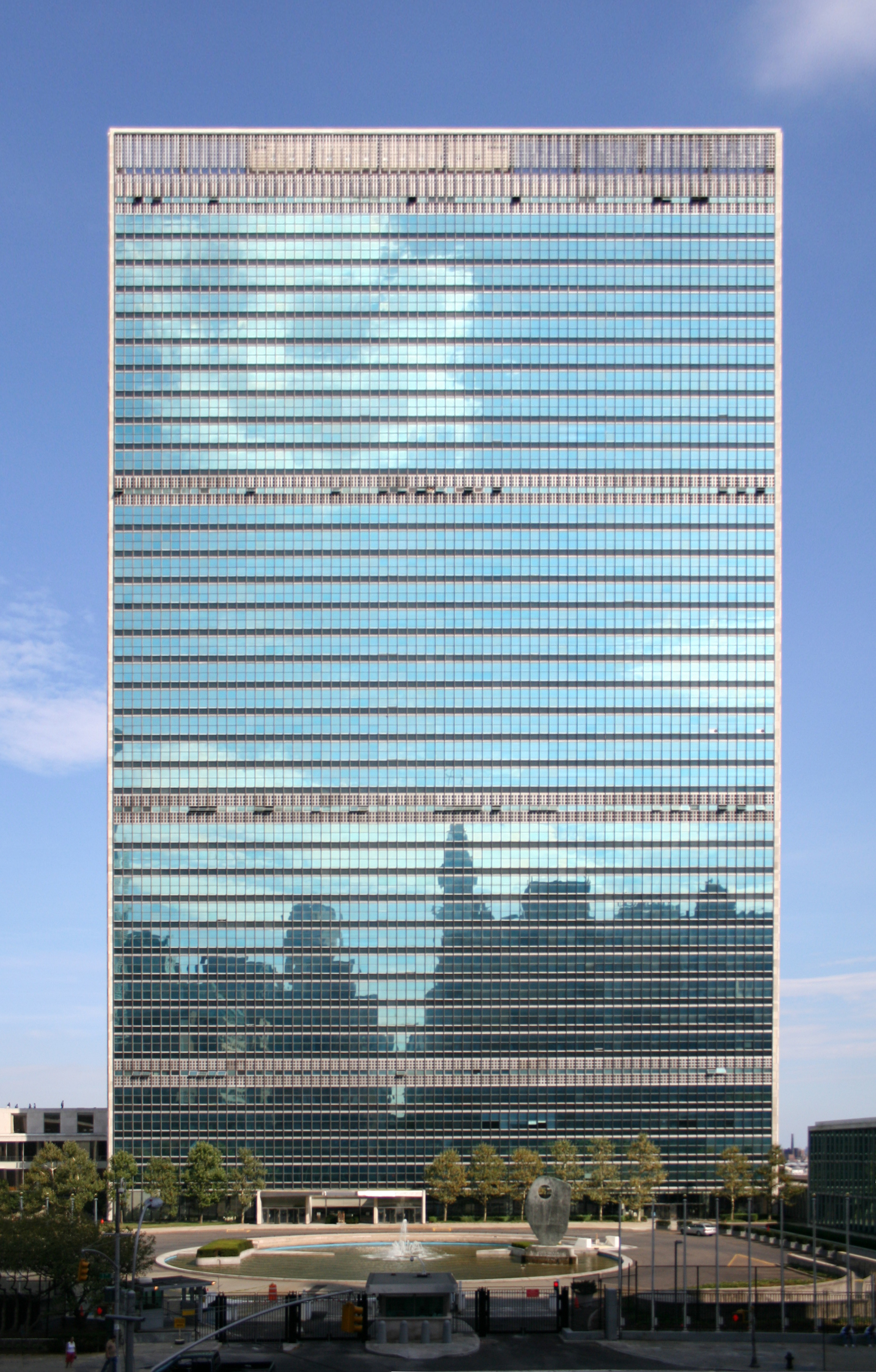
The Secretariat Building is a 154-metre-tall (505 ft) skyscraper and the centerpiece of the Headquarters of the United Nations.

The secretary-general is appointed by the General Assembly upon the recommendation of the Security Council. As the recommendation must come from the Security Council, any of the five permanent members of the council can veto a nomination. Most secretaries-general are compromise candidates from middle powers and have little prior fame.

Unofficial qualifications for the job have been set by precedent in previous selections. The appointee may not be a citizen of any of the Security Council's five permanent members. The General Assembly resolution 51/241 in 1997 stated that, in the appointment of "the best candidate", due regard should be given to regional (continental) rotation of the appointee's national origin and to gender equality, although no woman has yet served as secretary-general. All appointees to date have been career diplomats.

The length of the term is discretionary, but all secretaries-general since 1971 have been appointed to five-year terms. Every secretary-general since 1961 has been re-selected for a second term, with the exception of Boutros Boutros-Ghali, who was vetoed by the United States in the 1996 selection. While the position does not have a formal term limit, incumbent secretaries-general have avoided seeking a third term since the 1981 selection, when China cast a record 16 vetoes against a third term for Kurt Waldheim.

The selection process is opaque and is often compared to a papal conclave. Since 1981, the Security Council has voted in secret in a series of straw polls; it then submits the winning candidate to the General Assembly for ratification. No candidate has ever been rejected by the General Assembly, and only once, in 1950, has a candidate been voted upon despite a UNSC veto.

In 2016, the General Assembly and the Security Council sought nominations and conducted public debates for the first time. However, the Security Council voted in private and followed the same process as previous selections, leading the president of the General Assembly to complain that it "does not live up to the expectations of the membership and the new standard of openness and transparency".

== Powers and duties ==
The UN Charter designates the secretary-general as the "chief administrative officer" of the UN, and gives the secretary-general the power to make employment decisions about Secretariat staff. The Charter also empowers the secretary-general to inform the Security Council of "any matter which in his opinion may threaten the maintenance of international peace and security", and allows the secretary-general to perform "such other functions as are entrusted" by other United Nations organs. These provisions have been interpreted as providing broad leeway for officeholders to serve a variety of roles as suited to their preferences, skill set, or circumstances. The UN describes the role of the secretary-general as combining the functions and responsibilities of an advocate, diplomat, civil servant, and chief executive officer.

The secretary-general's routine duties include overseeing the activities and duties of the secretariat; attending sessions with United Nations bodies; consulting with world leaders, government officials, and other stakeholders; and travelling the world to engage with global constituents and bring attention to certain international issues. The secretary-general publishes an annual report on the work of the UN, which includes an assessment of its activities and an outline future priorities. The secretary-general is also the chairman of the United Nations System Chief Executives Board for Coordination (CEB), a body composed of the heads of all UN funds, programmes, and specialized agencies, which meets twice a year to discuss substantive and management issues facing the United Nations System.

Many of the secretary-general's powers are informal and left open to individual interpretation; some appointees have opted for more activist roles, while others have been more technocratic or administrative. The secretary-general is often reliant upon the use of their "good offices", described as "steps taken publicly and in private, drawing upon his independence, impartiality and integrity, to prevent international disputes from arising, escalating or spreading". Consequently, observers have variably described the office as the "world's most visible bully pulpit" or as the "world's moderator". Examples include Dag Hammarskjöld's promotion of an armistice between the warring parties of Arab-Israel conflict, Javier Perez de Cuellar's negotiation of a ceasefire in the Iran-Iraq War, and U Thant's role in deescalating the Cuban Missile Crisis.

== Residence ==
The official residence of the secretary-general is a townhouse at 3 Sutton Place, Manhattan, in New York City, United States. The townhouse was built for Anne Morgan in 1921 and donated by Arthur A. Houghton Jr. to the United Nations in 1972. Prior to this, secretaries-general chose where to live.

== Initiatives ==
=== Youth 2030 ===
Youth 2030 is a UN system-wide Youth Strategy, launched on 24 September 2018 by the Secretary-General. It "seeks to strengthen and increase commitments at the global, regional and national level to meet young people's needs, help them realize their rights, and recognize their positive contributions as agents of change. Denmark was the first member country to make a financial commitment to the strategy, and on 19 September the Misk Foundation signed a partnership agreement with the Office of the United Nations Secretary-General's Envoy on Youth, pledging support.

=== Our Common Agenda ===
Our Common Agenda is "the Secretary-General's vision for the future of global cooperation". It calls for cooperation and multilateralism to promote action that achieves the Sustainable Development Goals.

=== Youth Advisory Group on Climate Change ===
The Secretary-General's Youth Advisory Group on Climate Change was launched on 27 July 2020, in the midst of the COVID-19 pandemic. The group was convened under the Youth2030 strategy and Our Common Agenda, as a way for the Secretary-General to engage directly with young people on issues related to climate change. Initially established with seven members, it was expanded to 14 with the third cohort beginning its term on 12 August 2025. Each group has a two-year term.

== List of secretaries-general ==
No.	Portrait	Name (born–died)	Term of office			Country	UN Regional Group
No.	Portrait	Name (born–died)	Took office	Left office	Time in office	Country	UN Regional Group
Acting		Gladwyn Jebb (1900–1996)	24 October 1945	2 February 1946	101 days	United Kingdom	Commonwealth of Nations
Acting	Jebb served as executive secretary of the Preparatory Commission of the United Nations in August 1945 and was appointed Acting United Nations secretary-general until the appointment of the first secretary-general.						
1		Trygve Lie (1896–1968)	2 February 1946	10 November 1952	6 years, 282 days	Norway	Western Europe
1	Lie, a foreign minister and former labour leader, was recommended by the Soviet Union to fill the post. After the UN involvement in the Korean War, the Soviet Union vetoed Lie's reappointment in 1951. The United States circumvented the Soviet Union's veto and recommended reappointment directly to the General Assembly. Lie was reappointed by a vote of 46 to 5, with eight abstentions. The Soviet Union remained hostile to Lie; he resigned in 1952.						
2		Dag Hammarskjöld (1905–1961)	10 April 1953	18 September 1961 †	8 years, 161 days	Sweden	Western European and Others
2	After a series of candidates were vetoed, Hammarskjöld emerged as an option that was acceptable to the Security Council. He was re-elected unanimously to a second term in 1957. Angered by Hammarskjöld's leadership during the Congo Crisis, the Soviet Union suggested replacing the position of secretary-general by a troika. Facing great opposition from the Western nations, the Soviet Union gave up on its suggestion. Hammarskjöld died in a plane crash in Northern Rhodesia (now Zambia) in 1961. US president John F. Kennedy called him "the greatest statesman of our century". Hammarskjöld was posthumously awarded the 1961 Nobel Peace Prize.						
Acting		U Thant (1909–1974)	3 November 1961	30 November 1962	1 year, 27 days	Burma	Asian
3		U Thant (1909–1974)	30 November 1962	31 December 1971	9 years, 31 days	Burma	Asian
3	Following Hammarskjöld's death, the developing world insisted on a non-European secretary-general; U Thant was unanimously recommended but due to opposition from the French (Thant had chaired a committee on Algerian independence) and the Arabs (Burma supported Israel), Thant was only appointed for the remainder of Hammarskjöld's term (1 year and 5 months, until 10 April 1963). The following year, on 30 November, Thant was unanimously re-elected and his partial term was promoted to a full 5-year term ending on 3 November 1966. On 2 December 1966, Thant was again unanimously re-elected, and appointed by a General Assembly session to a 5-year-and-2-month term aligned with the calendar year. Thant did not seek a third election. Thant was the first Asian secretary-general.						
4		Kurt Waldheim (1918–2007)	1 January 1972	31 December 1981	10 years	Austria	Western European and Others
4	Waldheim launched a discreet but effective campaign to become the secretary-general. Despite initial vetoes from China and the United Kingdom, Waldheim was elected in the third round. In 1976, China initially blocked Waldheim's re-election but relented on the second ballot. In 1981, Waldheim's re-election for a third term was blocked by China, which vetoed his selection through 15 rounds. From 1986 to 1992, Waldheim served as President of Austria. In 1985, it was revealed that a post-World War II UN War Crimes Commission had labelled Waldheim as a suspected war criminal based on his involvement with the Wehrmacht.						
5		Javier Pérez de Cuéllar (1920–2020)	1 January 1982	31 December 1991	10 years	Peru	Latin American and Caribbean
5	Pérez de Cuéllar was selected after a five-week deadlock between the re-election of Waldheim and China's candidate, Salim Ahmed Salim of Tanzania. Pérez de Cuéllar, a Peruvian diplomat who a decade earlier had served as President of the UN Security Council during his time as Peruvian ambassador to the UN, was a compromise candidate. He became the first and thus far only secretary-general from the Americas. He was re-elected unanimously in 1986. From 2000 to 2001, Pérez de Cuéllar served as Prime Minister of Peru.						
6		Boutros Boutros-Ghali (1922–2016)	1 January 1992	31 December 1996	5 years	Egypt	African
6	The 102-member Non-Aligned Movement insisted that the next secretary-general come from Africa. With a majority in the General Assembly and the support of China, the "Non-Aligned Movement had the votes necessary to block any unfavorable candidate". The Security Council conducted five anonymous straw polls and Boutros-Ghali emerged with 11 votes on the fifth round. In 1996, the United States vetoed the re-appointment of Boutros-Ghali due to political fallout over the Battle of Mogadishu.						
7		Kofi Annan (1938–2018)	1 January 1997	31 December 2006	10 years	Ghana	African
7	On 13 December 1996, the Security Council recommended Annan. He was confirmed four days later by the vote of the General Assembly. Annan and the UN were the recipients of the 2001 Nobel Peace Prize.						
8		Ban Ki-moon (b. 1944)	1 January 2007	31 December 2016	10 years	South Korea	Asia-Pacific
8	Ban was Foreign Minister of South Korea and became the first East Asian to be selected as the secretary-general. He was unanimously elected to a second term on 21 June 2011.						
9		António Guterres (b. 1949)	1 January 2017	Incumbent	9 years, 324 days	Portugal	Western European and Others
9	Guterres is the first former head of government to become secretary-general, and the first secretary-general born after the establishment of the United Nations. He was the Prime Minister of Portugal from 1995 to 2002. He has also been President of the Socialist International (1999–2005) and United Nations High Commissioner for Refugees (2005–2015). Since August 2024, Guterres also holds East-Timorese citizenship.						

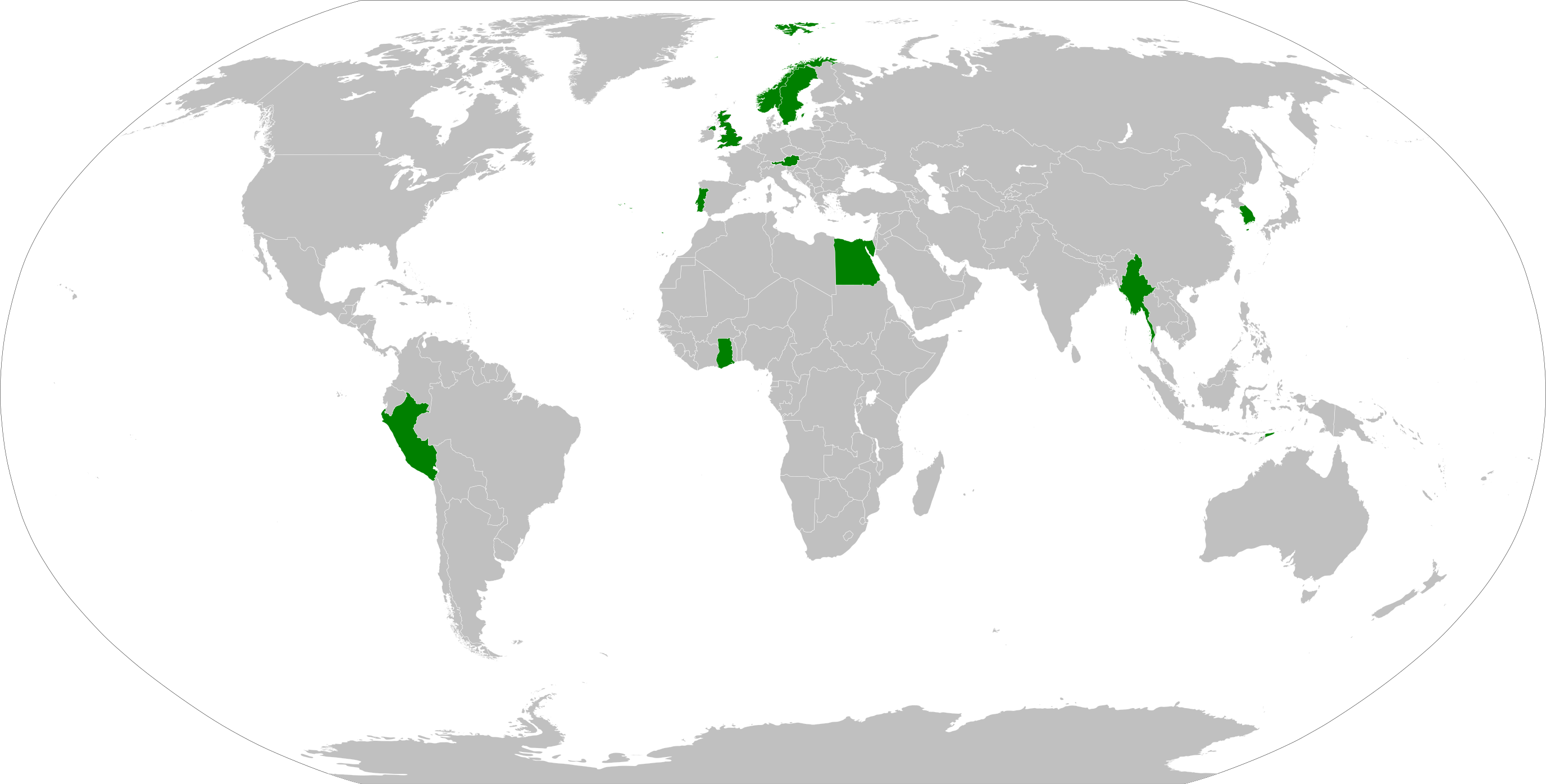
Map showing which nations have had a national serving as secretary-general of the United Nations

Birthplaces of Secretaries-General of the United Nations

== Statistics ==
#	Country of Origin	Secretary-General	Born	Age at start of first term	Time in office (total)	Age at retirement	Lifespan	
#	Country of Origin	Secretary-General	Born	Age at start of first term	Time in office (total)	Age at retirement	Died	Age
–	United Kingdom	Gladwyn Jebb	25 April 1900	45 years, 182 days 24 October 1945	102 days	45 years, 283 days 2 February 1946	24 October 1996	96 years, 182 days
1	Norway	Trygve Lie	16 July 1896	49 years, 201 days 2 February 1946	6 years, 283 days	56 years, 117 days 10 November 1952	30 December 1968	72 years, 167 days
2	Sweden	Dag Hammarskjöld	29 July 1905	47 years, 255 days 10 April 1953	8 years, 162 days	56 years, 51 days 18 September 1961 †	18 September 1961	56 years, 51 days
3	Burma	U Thant	22 January 1909	52 years, 285 days 3 November 1961	10 years, 59 days	62 years, 343 days 31 December 1971	25 November 1974	65 years, 307 days
4	Austria	Kurt Waldheim	21 December 1918	53 years, 11 days 1 January 1972	10 years, 0 days	63 years, 10 days 31 December 1981	14 June 2007	88 years, 175 days
5	Peru	Javier Pérez de Cuéllar	19 January 1920	61 years, 347 days 1 January 1982	10 years, 0 days	71 years, 346 days 31 December 1991	4 March 2020	100 years, 45 days
6	Egypt	Boutros Boutros-Ghali	14 November 1922	69 years, 48 days 1 January 1992	5 years, 0 days	74 years, 47 days 31 December 1996	16 February 2016	93 years, 94 days
7	Ghana	Kofi Annan	8 April 1938	58 years, 268 days 1 January 1997	10 years, 0 days	68 years, 267 days 31 December 2006	18 August 2018	80 years, 132 days
8	South Korea	Ban Ki-moon	13 June 1944	62 years, 202 days 1 January 2007	10 years, 0 days	72 years, 201 days 31 December 2016	(living)	82 years, 161 days
9	Portugal	António Guterres	30 April 1949	67 years, 246 days 1 January 2017	9 years, 324 days	(incumbent)	(living)	77 years, 205 days

=== By regional group ===
UN Regional Group	Secretaries-General	Terms
African Group	2	3
Asia-Pacific Group	2	5
Eastern European Group	0	0
Latin American and Caribbean Group	1	2
Western European and Others Group	4	8

== See also ==
- Under-Secretary-General of the United Nations
