= Austria victim theory =

Ideological basis for Austria (1949–1988)

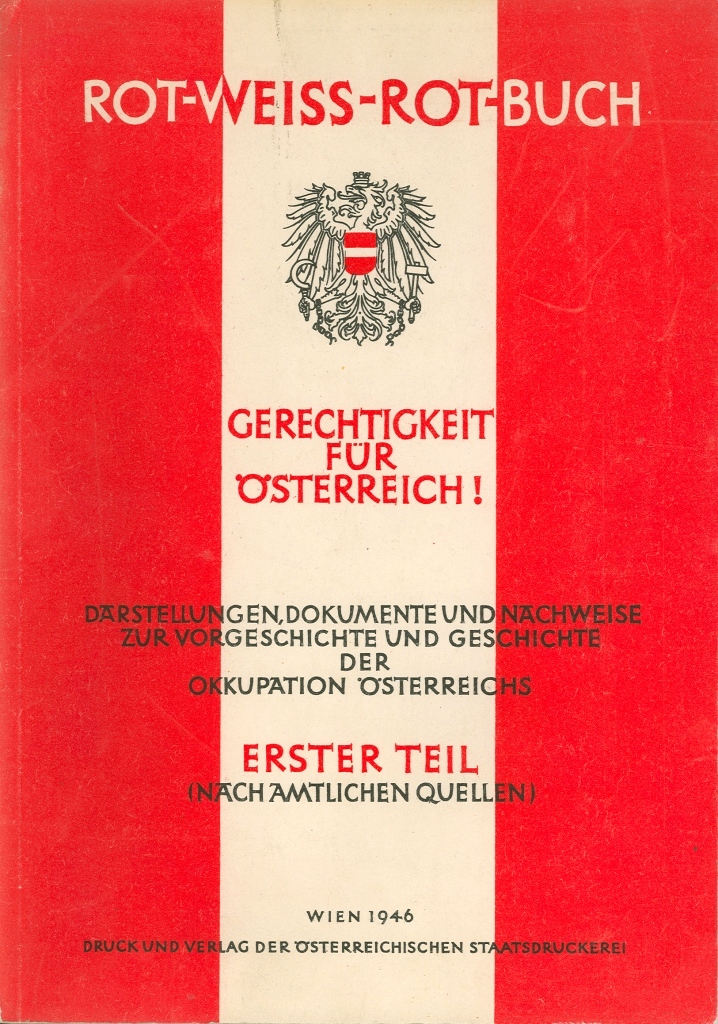
"Red-White-Red Book" published by the Austrian Ministry of Foreign Affairs in 1946, an official description of the point of view on events of 1938–1945 by the founders of the Second Austrian Republic

The victim theory (German: Opferthese), encapsulated in the slogan "Austria – the Nazis' first victim" (Österreich – das erste Opfer der Nazis), was the Austrian ideological basis formed by Austrians themselves under Allied occupation and the independent Second Austrian Republic, officially promoted from 1949 to 1988. According to the founders of the Second Austrian Republic, the 1938 Anschluss was an act of military aggression by the Third Reich and therefore the newly revived Austria of 1945 could not be considered responsible for the Nazis' crimes in any way. The "victim theory" that had formed by 1949 insisted that all of the Austrians, including those who strongly supported Adolf Hitler, had been unwilling victims of the Nazi regime and were therefore not responsible for its crimes.

The "victim theory" became a fundamental myth in Austrian society which allowed previously bitter political opponents – e.g. the Social Democrats and the conservative Catholics – to unite and bring former Nazis back into social and political life. For almost half a century, the Austrian state denied the existence of any continuity between it and the political regime that had existed in Austria from 1938 to 1945, actively kept up the myth of Austrian self-sacrificing statehood, and cultivated an image of national unity. Postwar denazification was quickly wound up; veterans of the Wehrmacht and the Waffen-SS took an honorable place in society. The struggle for justice by the actual victims of Nazism – primarily Jews – was deprecated as an attempt to obtain illicit enrichment at the expense of the rest of the Austrian nation.

In 1986, the election of a former Wehrmacht intelligence officer, Kurt Waldheim, as federal president put Austria on the verge of international isolation. Powerful external pressure and an internal political discussion forced Austrians to reconsider their attitude to the past. Starting with the political administration in 1988 and then followed by most of the Austrian people, the nation admitted its collective responsibility for the crimes committed during the Nazi occupation and officially abandoned the "victim theory". Some historians also call the "victim theory" the "big lie".

== Historical background ==
A map of the German Confederation

The idea of grouping all Germans into one nation-state had been the subject of debate in the 19th century from the ending of the Holy Roman Empire until the ending of the German Confederation. The Habsburgs and the Austrian Empire favored the Großdeutsche Lösung ("Greater German solution") idea of uniting all German-speaking peoples into one state. On the other hand, the Kleindeutsche Lösung ("Lesser German solution") sought only to unify the northern German states and not include Austria; this proposal was largely advocated by the inhabitants of the Kingdom of Prussia. The Prussians defeated the Austrians in the Austro-Prussian War in 1866, which ultimately excluded Austria from Germany. Otto von Bismarck established the North German Confederation, which sought to prevent the Austrian and Bavarian Catholics from forming any sort of force against the predominantly Protestant Prussian and northern German states. He used the Franco-Prussian War to convince other German states, including the Kingdom of Bavaria, to fight against the Second French Empire. After Prussia's victory in that war, Bismarck unified Germany into a nation-state in 1871 and proclaimed the German Empire, without Austria.

After its defeat by Prussia in 1866, the following year Austria sided with Hungary and formed the Austro-Hungarian Empire in 1867. During its existence, the German-speaking Austrians hoped the empire would dissolve and advocated an Anschluss with Germany. Following the dissolution of the empire in 1918, the rump state of German-Austria was created. Immediately following the publication of the humiliating terms of the Treaty of Saint-Germain-en-Laye (1919) a drive for unification with Germany emerged, but its practical actions were strictly suppressed by the victorious states. The short-lived state of "German-Austria" ceased to exist and the concept of union with Germany was rejected by the victors, thus leading to the establishment of the First Austrian Republic.

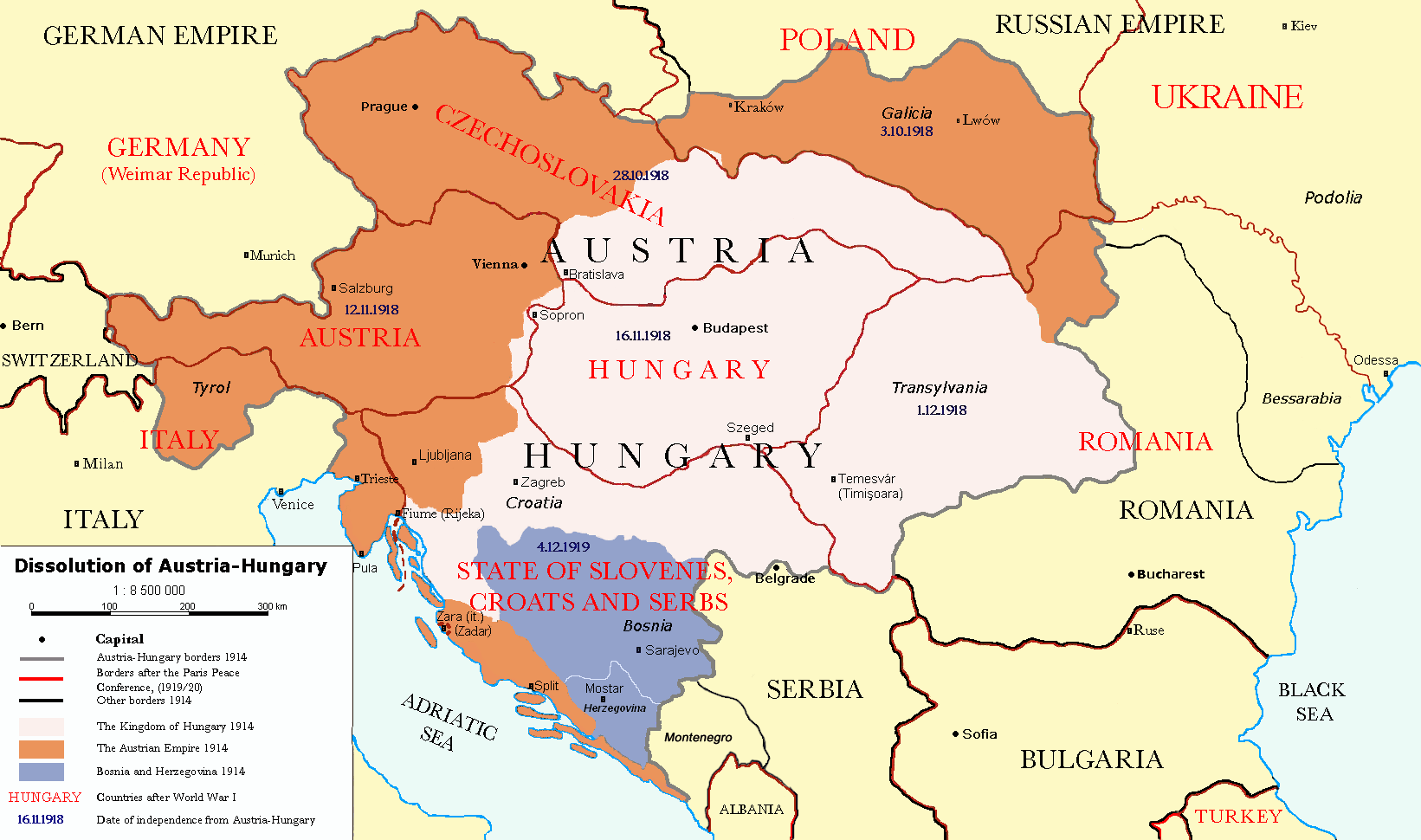
The partition of Austria-Hungary in 1918

After a short period of unity (1918–1920), people did not recognize themselves as a nation but divided into three armed enemy camps: the working class, led by the social democrats; the conservative Catholics, led by the governing Christian Social Party and the Catholic Church; and supporters of unification with Germany. In 1933, the conservative leader Engelbert Dollfuss dissolved parliament, drove social democrats from power structures, banned communists and Nazis, and installed a one-party authoritarian rule with a right-wing trend. In February 1934 the conflict developed into a civil war, which resulted in the defeat of the left-wing forces. In July, National Socialist sympathisers rebelled and killed Dollfuss but failed in their attempt to seize power. From March 11 to 13, 1938, the Austrian state fell under the pressure of Nazi Germany and Austrian National Socialists. The vast majority of Austrians supported annexation by Germany. Only some solitary pieces of evidence show public rejection or even indifference to the Anschluss, mainly in rural areas. Although there were about half-a-million people in the capital, including thousands of Jews, Mischlings and political opponents, with reasons to fear Nazi repressions, there was no active resistance to the Anschluss.

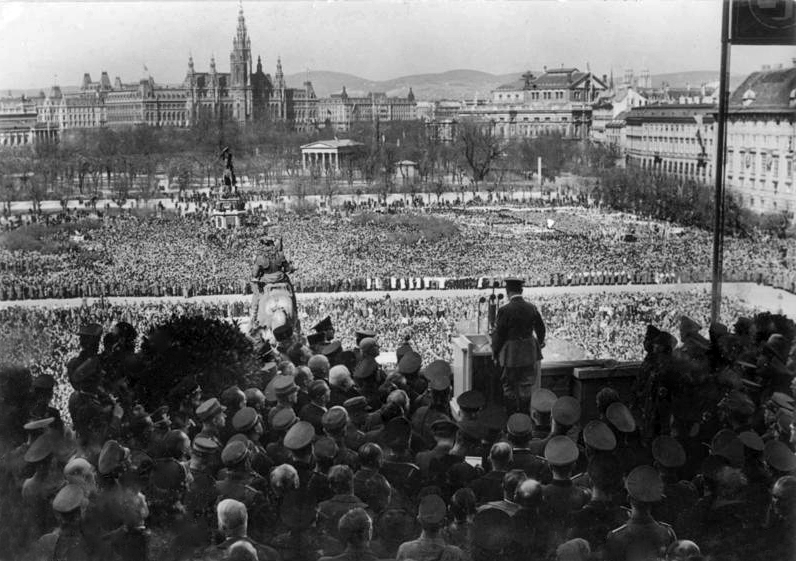
March 15, 1938. Vienneses greet Hitler on Heldenplatz. That evidence was rejected in postwar Austria as Nazi propaganda. Ideologists of the Second Republic alleged that there had been no mass support for the Anschluss and all the Austrians were "victims of occupation".

Austrian Germans favored the advent of strong power capable of preventing another civil war and negating the humiliating Treaty of Saint-Germain-en-Laye, rather than the specific unification with the northern neighbor. Nearly all Austrians expected that the new regime would quickly restore a standard of living like that before the Great Depression. Most of the population also awaited a "solution" of the odious Jewish question. Antisemitism, as one of the national strains, flourished in Austria more than in any other German-speaking land: since 1920, parties with openly antisemitic manifestos had been ruling the country. Pogroms starting in Vienna and Innsbruck during the Anschluss were organized not by Hitler's agents but by the Austrians themselves. According to eyewitness accounts, they exceeded similar acts in Germany in the level of cruelty and the scale of involvement of local townspeople. Following the March 1938 Anschluss with Germany, there was an organized "Aryanization", whereby the Nazis confiscated Jewish assets—whether businesses, homes, or financial holdings alike—in an effort to remove Jews from the economy. For instance, no Jews owned any property in Linz after "Aryanization" was implemented. The primary goal at that time was not to create a Holocaust in Austria but to force Jews to emigrate from Germany. From 1938 to 1941, about 126,000 or 135,000 Jews escaped from Austria, nearly 15,000 of whom perished in German-occupied countries. Starting with the Dollfuss-Schuschnigg regime and after that wave of emigration, Austria forever lost its scientific schools of physics, law, economy, Viennese school of psychoanalysis and Werkbund architects. However, apart from emigration, there was from 1933 to 1937 an influx of refugees from Germany.

The Holocaust started in Austria in July 1941 and had mostly finished by the end of 1942. The arrestees were taken to ghettos and concentration camps in Belarus, Latvia and Poland via Theresienstadt and were ultimately killed. Toward the end of the war, the slaughter resumed in Austria, where thousands of Hungarian Jews worked on the construction of defense lines. The extermination of Jews, treated as slaves "privatized" by the local Nazis, continued in the rural areas of Styria for several weeks after Germany had surrendered. The case of slaveowners from Graz reached the court of the British occupation power. The British field investigations resulted in 30 death sentences for Styrian Nazis, 24 of whom were executed. In total, one third of Austrian Jews perished just in 7 years (nearly 65,000 people). As few as 5,816 Jews, including 2,142 camp prisoners, survived until the end of the war in Austria.

The total number of deaths caused by Hitler's repressions in Austria is estimated to be 120,000. During the two years (1940–1941) of Aktion T4, 18,269 people deemed mentally ill were murdered in Hartheim Castle alone. Practically all of the Roma community living in Austria was eliminated; moreover, no fewer than 100,000 Slovenes, Czechs, Hungarians and Croatians were forced to leave Austrian Germany. Also, 100,000 other people were arrested for political reasons, nearly 2700 were executed for active resistance, and nearly 500 perished by resisting arrest or being targeted by local forces. Austrian resistance against the regime was meagre and produced no significant results. The overwhelming majority of Austrians actively supported the regime until its end. Among 6.5 million Austrians of all ages, 700,000 (17% of adults) were members of the NSDAP. In 1942, before the number of German casualties began to increase, the ratio was greater: 688,000 Austrians (8.2% of the overall population) were NSDAP members. Together with their family members, a fourth of all Austrians were involved in the NSDAP. A disproportionate share of the personnel within the Nazi repression machine came from Austria, which had 8% of the German population, but produced 14% of SS soldiers and 40% of extermination camp staff. More than 1.2 million Austrians fought on the side of the Axis powers. During the war 247,000 military personnel were killed and 25,000 to 30,000 civilians perished in Allied bombings and the Vienna offensive. Also, 170,000 Austrians returned disabled, and more than 470,000 were taken prisoner by the Allies.

Despite all of those losses, the actual population of Austria did not decrease during the war. The country accepted hundreds of thousands of Germans escaping Allied bombings, and at least more than a million foreigners (war prisoners and workers from the countries occupied by Germany) had been working in Austria. In April 1945, there were 1.65 million displaced persons in Austria.

== Moscow Declaration ==
The characterization of Austria as a victim of Germany first appeared in English-speaking journalism in 1938, before the beginning of the Anschluss. Shortly before the outbreak of the war in 1939, the writer Paul Gallico - himself of partly Austrian origin - published the novel The Adventures of Hiram Holliday, part of which is set in post-Anschluss Austria and depicts an Austrian society strongly detesting the newly imposed Nazi rule, with Austrians feeling oppressed by the vicious alien rule; in Gallico's depiction, there were hardly any Austrians collaborating with the Nazis.

References to Austria as a victim of Germany appeared in Soviet literature after the invasion of the USSR and while Soviet authors called Spain "fascism's first victim", implying combined aggression by Italy and Germany, Austria was assigned the role of "Hitler's first victim." When the Soviets began occupying Austria after the Red Army defeated German forces, its commanders even reiterated to the troops that Austria was "Hitler's first victim" and stressed for them not to conflate "Austrian civilians with German occupiers."

=== British initiative ===
The Allies started to discuss the postwar destiny of Austria in 1941. On December 16 Stalin reported his plan to break up Germany to Anthony Eden: Austria would become an independent state again. The British, having no plans for such a distant future, had nothing against this proposal. During 1942–1943 the attitude of the Allies to the Austrian question changed: the leaders of the USSR had not suggested any new scheme, while the British took the future of Austria into serious consideration. On February 18, 1942, Winston Churchill said in his speech to Austrian emigrants: "We can never forget here on this island that Austria was the first victim of Nazi aggression. The people of Britain will never desert the cause of the freedom of Austria from the Prussian yoke".

On September 26, 1942, Eden declared Churchill's plan for the creation of a "Danube confederation" composed of Austria, Hungary, Poland, and Czechoslovakia – a vast buffer state that would have separated Western Europe from the USSR. In the spring of 1943, Geoffrey Harrison, a 34-year-old civil servant in the Foreign Office, developed a plan for the post-war organisation of Austria, which subsequently became the official British policy regarding the Austrian question. Harrison's viewpoint was that recreation of an independent but weak Austria within the borders of the First Republic was only possible with the readiness of the Western allies to support the new state for many years. Harrison did not believe in the ability of the Austrians to self-organize nor in the probability of them rising in armed resistance against the regime. The best solution according to the British point of view would have been a strong confederation of Danube states with Austria included de jure as an equal member, but de facto as a cultural and political leader. It was not possible to create such a union in immediate post-war Europe; an independent Austria would have to be created first, and it would have to be provided with political guarantees and financial support. Only afterward a political union could have been developed step-by-step.

Soviet historiography of the 1970s called the British project an attempt to "push through the idea of a new Anschluss". As M. A. Poltavsky wrote, the Allies pursued a plan to "create a conglomeration of regions in Europe that would have become a constant seat of conflicts". There are two points of view on the motives of British politicians in contemporary western historiography. The traditional one considers their actions solely an attempt to protect British concerns and to oppose the USSR in the postwar break up of Nazi Germany. According to an alternative explanation advanced by R. Keyserling, the British were mainly guided by erroneous utopian plans to foment mass resistance against the Nazi regime in Austrian lands, to disrupt the German Reich from the inside, and to create a convenient springboard for an attack from the south. Both points of view agree that in 1943 British and American politicians mistakenly thought that Germany was ready to collapse under pressure from Soviet troops or people's indignation from the inside of the Reich.

=== Text endorsements ===
At the end of May 1943 Harrison's plan was approved by the British cabinet, but by June Vyacheslav Molotov had let the Foreign Office know that any association or confederation of Danube states was not acceptable to the USSR. Molotov's deputy, Solomon Lozovsky, decried such a union calling it "the instrument of anti-Soviet politics". The British did not abandon the plan, so on August 14, 1943, Eden sent Harrison's project, the "Declaration on Austria", to Moscow and Washington. The text started by stating that "Austria was the first free country to fall victim to Nazi aggression". Again, facing resistance from Soviet diplomats, the British started to back down. According to Soviet insistence, the project lost any mention of association with neighboring states and Atlantic Charter, the "Austrian nation" was replaced with an unambiguous "Austria", and "Nazi aggression" – with "Hitlerite aggression". The British negotiations with the Americans were not any less difficult.

The Moscow Declaration on Austria was the result of this haggling between the Allied ministers. It was adopted on September 30 and published on November 1, 1943. Despite all the edits made, the phrase "the first victim" remained practically untouched: "Austria, the first free country to fall a victim to Hitlerite aggression, shall be liberated from German domination." The text was finished with a strict reminder, which was insisted by Stalin, that Austria "has a responsibility, which she cannot evade, for participation in the war on the side of Hitlerite Germany" (full text). According to Stalin's addendum, the responsibility did not lie on the shoulders of certain people, groups, or parties, but on the society as a whole; there was no way for an Austrian to escape from collective responsibility. Stalin, like Churchill, had also considered Austria to be a buffer between Soviet and Anglo-American spheres of influence, and had not been in a hurry to carry out the "export of revolution". His short-term goal was to exploit the surviving Austrian industrial, human, and natural resources; probably that's why Stalin insisted on the stricter wording concerning responsibility. The authors are unlikely to have suspected "the first victim" would become an Austrian national theme, which would be carefully cultivated and protected, and determine Austrian foreign policy for many years. Moreover, they didn't know that another part of the Declaration—the Austrian responsibility—would die on the vine. At the Nuremberg trial, the International Military Tribunal found that Austria's annexation constituted a premeditated act of aggression—rejecting the contention that the union reflected genuine popular desire, on the grounds that "the ultimate factor was the armed might of Germany ready to be used if any resistance was encountered."

=== Response of belligerent Austrians ===
Different historical schools admit that defeats in 1943 gave rise to doubt amongst the Austrians about the future of the Reich and helped the spread of separatist sentiments. But they disagree on the role of this sentiment in history. According to the official post-war Austrian point of view, the defeat in the Battle of Stalingrad started a fully-fledged "national awakening". Soviet historians insisted that in 1943 a new stage of resistance began in Austria, and the Moscow Declaration proved to be an "important factor that influenced the Austrian nation". Contemporary Western historians believe that there is no reason for drawing firm conclusions about "awakening" or "resistance". Antihitlerite and separatist sentiments had been spreading both in Vienna and remote places of Austria, but nearly in the same degree as in other lands of the Reich. War defeats, the Italian withdrawal from the war, Anglo-American bombings, streams of refugees and prisoners facilitated this; but Western historians deny the influence of the Moscow Declaration. Evan Bukey admits that the Declaration inspired the Austrian underground, but neither increased their forces nor helped to spread separatist sentiments. R. Keyserling wrote that the Declaration brought the Allies more harm than good. The operation of British propagandists among Austrian soldiers at the Italian front failed : the Moscow Declaration has not influenced the fighting spirit of German troops and, probably, merely was a great help for Goebbels' counterpropaganda.

Austria was far behind the lines of belligerent Germany and the reaction of Austrian civilians to the Moscow Declaration was twofold. On one hand, people made a false conclusion that the status of "the first victim" would help Austria avoid allied bombings. On the other hand, "Moscow" in the title was unmistakably associated not with the western allies, but with uncompromising Bolshevism. The people, as a whole, were indifferent to the news and did not support any anti-Hitler opposition groups. During 1943–1944 the number of arrests increased, but 80% of arrested were foreign workers, whose number was 140 thousand in Vienna alone. During 1944, as the military and economic landscape got worse, dissatisfaction increased among Austrians too, but not with the Hitler regime, but with the stream of refugees, especially Protestants, from the North. Internal conflicts did not undermine the fighting spirit of the nation. Quite the contrary, the success of the Allies and reactivation of air bombings of Austria only consolidated its population around the figure of the Fuehrer. During the unsuccessful 20 July plot people of Vienna fully supported Hitler.

== Declaration of victimhood ==
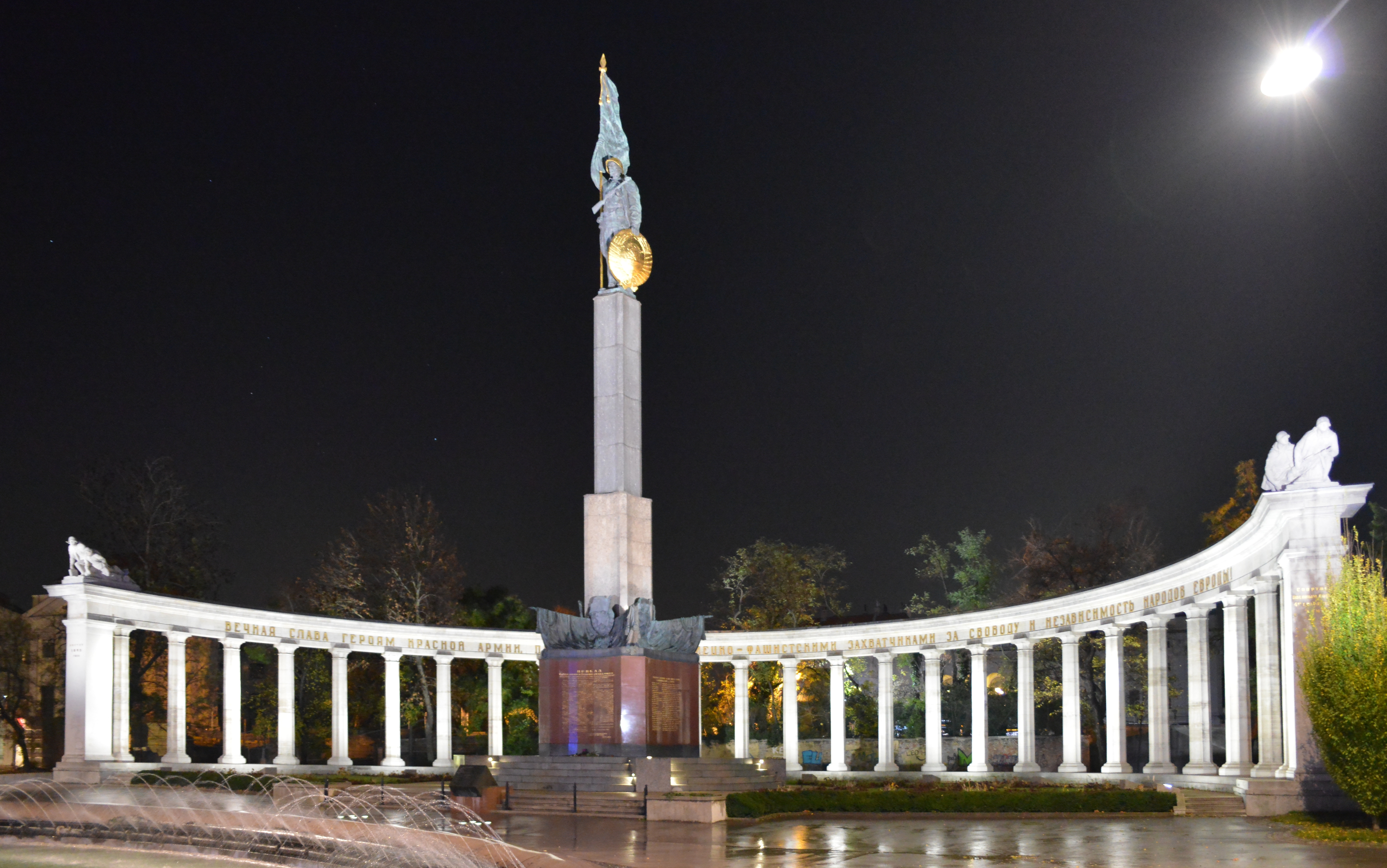
Heroes' Monument of the Red Army in Vienna. The phrase "... in battle against the German fascist invaders" carved on the stone tablet in front of the monument, from the Austrian politicians' point of view, confirmed innocence of Austrians.

On April 13, 1945, the Soviet troops captured Vienna. Two weeks later, on April 27, the Provisional Government, formed by Soviet forces under Karl Renner, promulgated the "Proclamation of the Second Republic of Austria", which reprinted the text of the Moscow Declaration. Renner, who had previously been an active supporter of the Anschluss, still considered it a historical necessity and expressed his regret over the forced separation of Austria and Germany under pressure from the Allies in his address to the nation. The majority of Austrians agreed with him. But the proclamation of April 27, which was addressed not so much to the nationals as to the victorious states, declared the opposite: events of 1938 were not the result of an agreement between equal parties or expression of the popular will, but the result of "an uncovered external pressure, a terrorist plot by own National Socialist [Nazi] minority, deception and blackmail during talks, and then – an open military occupation ... The Adolf Hitler's Third Reich deprived people of Austria of their power and freedom to express their will, led them to a senseless and pointless massacre, which no one Austrian has not wanted to take part in."

The proclamation of April 27 gingerly repudiated the claim of the Moscow declaration about Austria's contribution to its liberation: since, as the fathers of the Second Republic asserted, during the 1938–1945 period Austrian statehood had been temporarily interrupted, the revived Austria should not have been responsible for crimes of "invaders". In May–June 1945 the Provisional Government recorded this proposition in an official "doctrine of the occupation" (German: Okkupationsdoktrin). All the guilt and responsibility for the crimes of the occupation regime was laid at the door of Germany – the only successor of the Hitlerite Reich. The position of the Ministry for Foreign Affairs of Austria on the Jewish question became a practical consequence of this doctrine: as there had not been Austrians to persecute Jews, but German occupiers, then "according to international law Austrian Jews should submit their claims for reparations not to Austria, but the German Reich". The Foreign Minister of Austria Karl Gruber organized the compilation and publishing of the "Red-White-Red Book" in order persuade the victorious Allied Powers. The intent of Austrian politicians, in publishing this collection of real documents and selectively compiled "historical comments", was to persuade the victorious Allied Powers of the forced nature of the Anschluss and also of a mass rejection of Hitler's regime by Austrians. The book was planned to have more than one volume. But the second volume, the "story of Austrian resistance", was not published: according to the official version not enough archive evidence was found. The authors affirmed, for instance, that in 1938 70% of Austrians had not simply been against Anschluss, but they were said to feel a "fanatic animosity" against it. This is how the myth was established to later become an ideological foundation of the postwar Austria.

The founders of the Second Republic probably had a moral right to consider themselves to be victims of political repressions. Twelve of the seventeen members of the Cabinet of Leopold Figl, that headed the government in December 1945, were persecuted under Dollfuss, Schuschnigg and Hitler. Figl himself was imprisoned in Dachau and Mauthausen and for this reason he was insolent towards emigrants who had "escaped from difficulties". So it is not surprising that the claim of a "a spirit of solidarity on [the Dachau] camp street" (German: Der Geist der Lagerstrasse) followed "the first victim" myth: according to this legend, during their imprisonment, Austrian politicians came up with the agreement to stop interparty squabbles and unite forever for the sake of building a new and democratic Austria. Representatives of the major parties of the First Republic – conservatives, social democrats and communists – did unite, but only for a short time in early April 1945. According to the contemporary point of view, the politicians were united not because of conscious choice, but because of the need to survive in harsh postwar conditions and intentional pressure from the Allied occupation powers. The statement about "all-nation unity" of all Austrians in the cause of post-war reconstruction, being essential for the country to survive and revive, became the third fundamental myth. In fact not less important for Austria to survive was political and financial support from the United States.

== Evolution of victimhood ideology ==
=== Anti-fascist period ===
An anti-fascist spirit dominated Austrian public politics for two post-war years. Propaganda about the supposed feats of the Austrian resistance proved to the Allies the contribution made to the defeat of Nazism, which was required from Austrians by the Moscow Declaration. The other task of anti-fascist propaganda was to find a new ideology that could be relied on by a morally and financially exhausted nation. Anti-fascist rhetoric, forced from above, ran through the whole social life of Austria. Broken chains appeared on the coat of arms of Austria as a symbol of liberation of Austria from "foreign occupation" by Germany, memorial tablets and modest temporary monuments in honour of perished anti-fascists were installed in towns (the only big monument of this period, Heroes' Monument of the Red Army in Vienna, was erected due to insistence of the USSR). Propaganda at all levels praised feats of a few anti-fascist heroes, but carefully avoided the topics of Austrian Jews and extermination camps. The "victim theory" of this period, that ended not later than 1949, was based on four statements:

- the Anschluss of 1938 had not been a union of the German nation, but a violent seizure of Austria by a foreign aggressor;
- 1938–1945 should be considered a period of foreign occupation;
- despite having been suppressed by the occupiers, the Austrian resistance made a prominent contribution to the victory of the anti-Hitler coalition;
- Austrian soldiers of the Wehrmacht were forced to serve under a threat of cruel terror.

An informal ideology constructed from an anti-fascist openly left position was adopted by the Union of Concentration Camps Prisoners (German: KZ-Verband). This organisation pursued an aim to take control of the government and insisted that only active anti-fascists should be considered true victims of the regime thus closing their doors to "passive victims" – above all Jews who returned from the camps. Simon Wiesenthal accused KZ-Verband of continuing the "only for Aryans" practice that was accepted in Austrian parties before Anschluss – of copying Nazi division of inmates into "upper" and "lower" categories. The position of KZ-Verband determined the contents of the first Austrian laws about aid to Nazi victims. The Austrian government agreed not to offer them compensation, but solely an allowance and not for everyone - just to active participants of the resistance movement. On the initiative of both social democrats and conservatives, this law was extended to victims of the Dollfuss-Schuschnigg regime (except National Socialists). The "passive victims", especially emigrants, were not eligible for the allowance. The legislators followed political interests and helped only those from whom they could expect political assistance. Several thousands of surviving Jews were of no interest, since they "could not be politically instrumentalized," as opposed to hundreds of thousands of former front-line soldiers and Nazis.

=== Change of direction ===
Already in 1946 it became clear that leftist anti-fascist propaganda was not being accepted in Austrian society, so by 1947 its time was over. Prisoners, who returned from Allied detention, were surprised to find that Austrians "forgot" about the years of Hitler's regime. A patriotic upsurge appeared in the country and replaced bitter memories. In 1947 the Allies began the mass liberation of captivated Austrians and Austrian government restored half a million of "less tainted" (German: Minderbelastete) members of the former NSDAP (Nazi party) to their civil rights. From that moment a political struggle for the votes of former Nazis and veterans became a governing trait of Austrian political life. Conservatives and Social Democrats rejected anti-fascist rhetoric, while communists, who supported it, quickly lost their political weight. At the beginning of 1947 they lost their places in government, the police closed the 'KZ-Verband' at the end of that year. The 1948 Czechoslovak coup d'état and the threat of "export of revolution" deprived communists of all their former influence. A three-party coalition changed to a classical two-party system; the "Federation of Independents" now took the role of a small third political force. The grouping - created under Social Democratic sponsorship, – was a union of former Nazis, a virtual successor of the Austrian branch of NSDAP (Nazi party), who were banned from joining the "large" parties at that time. The marginalization of the communists, who really had been the backbone of the insignificant Austrian resistance, meant a political defeat of anti-fascists as a whole. The communists failed to enter the governing elite, their past endeavors appeared to be not needed in the contemporary internal Austrian politics; they were however occasionally remembered in communication with western diplomats.

Party ideologues realized that the anti-fascist policy did not resonate in Austrian society so they found the way out through the propagation of a conservative view of an Austrian "national identity". The "Book of Austria" published by the government in 1948 stated that Austria has been a country of simple, peaceful people of high culture, kind Catholics famous not for their wars or politics but for their ancient traditions. In place of an internal enemy (Nazism), the new ideology took on the familiar foreign enemy – Bolshevism. The image of "innocent victimhood", mostly addressed to the victory states and anticipating the expected near-term withdrawal of the occupying troops, was a good fit for internal policy, too. The "victim theory" assumed two forms: one for internal and one for foreign use. Austrians were still exploiting the slogan of the Moscow Declaration about being "Hitler's first victim" in their foreign politics. But inside Austria it was transformed into the newest unifying myth that all the Austrians, without any exception, were all victims. As a political expedient all sections of society were sequentially included to the list of the victims. Former Nazis were included to the myth as "victims" who have been deluded and deceived by the foreign tempter. Soon after the Federal Elections of 1949 (German: Nationalratswahl in Österreich 1949), they were officially recognized as "victims" of denazification together with those who they themselves victimized. In 1949 Rosa Jochmann, ideologist of social democrats, anti-fascist of the immediate past, and former prisoner of Ravensbrück, presented the new doctrine in this way:

We all were the victims of fascism. A soldier who has come through the war in its worst form at the front was the victim. The population of the home front, who has been afraid of waiting for air-raid alarm and who has been dreaming of getting rid of bombing horror, was the victim. Those who had to leave their motherland were the victims ... and finally we, unprotected victims of the SS, inmates of prisons and camps, were the victims. (Note: The German text reads: Opfer des Faschismus waren wir alle. Opfer war der Soldat, der draussen an der Front den Krieg in seiner furchtbarsten Form erlebt hat, war die Bevölkerung, die im Hinterland voll Entsetzen auf den Kuckkuckruf wartete, um in ihre Unterstände zu flüchten und voll Sehnsucht der Tag herbeizuwünschen, der diesen Schrecken von ihr nahm. Opfer waren jene, die die Heimat verlassen mussten, um das zumeist traurige Los des Emigranten auf sich zu nehmen, und Opfer waren schliesslich wir, die wir in Gefängnissen, Zuchthäusern und Konzentrationslagern der SS ausgeliefert gewesen sind.)

In the time of this new order, none of the truly abused groups such as Jews, Roma and political opponents to Nazism could ever hope to get targeted support from the state. Austrian society rejected claims from these groups and portrayed them as attempts to enrich themselves at the expense of all the "Nazis' victims". The existence of these groups itself was an 'inconvenience': they reminded the great mass of Austrians about their criminal past, hence their erasure from the collective memory. By 1949 installation of memorials to heroes of the resistance was no longer desirable, at least at the provinces. And by the beginning of the 1950s, it was identified as being antagonistic Communist propaganda. Some of the previously installed monuments were removed (e.g. common graves in KZ Ebensee and Sankt-Florian), other were redesigned to replace "provocative" texts with "neutral" ones (e.g. memorial tablet in Innsbruck at the place of death of Franz Mair (Widerstandskämpfer) that was edited twice – the first time at the alleged request of German tourists, the second time – at the request of local Catholics). The ideas of anti-fascists, who were "undermining the foundations" while hundreds of Austrians were performing their "sacred duty" even if under the banners of "German occupiers," were finally discredited and condemned.

=== Revanche ===
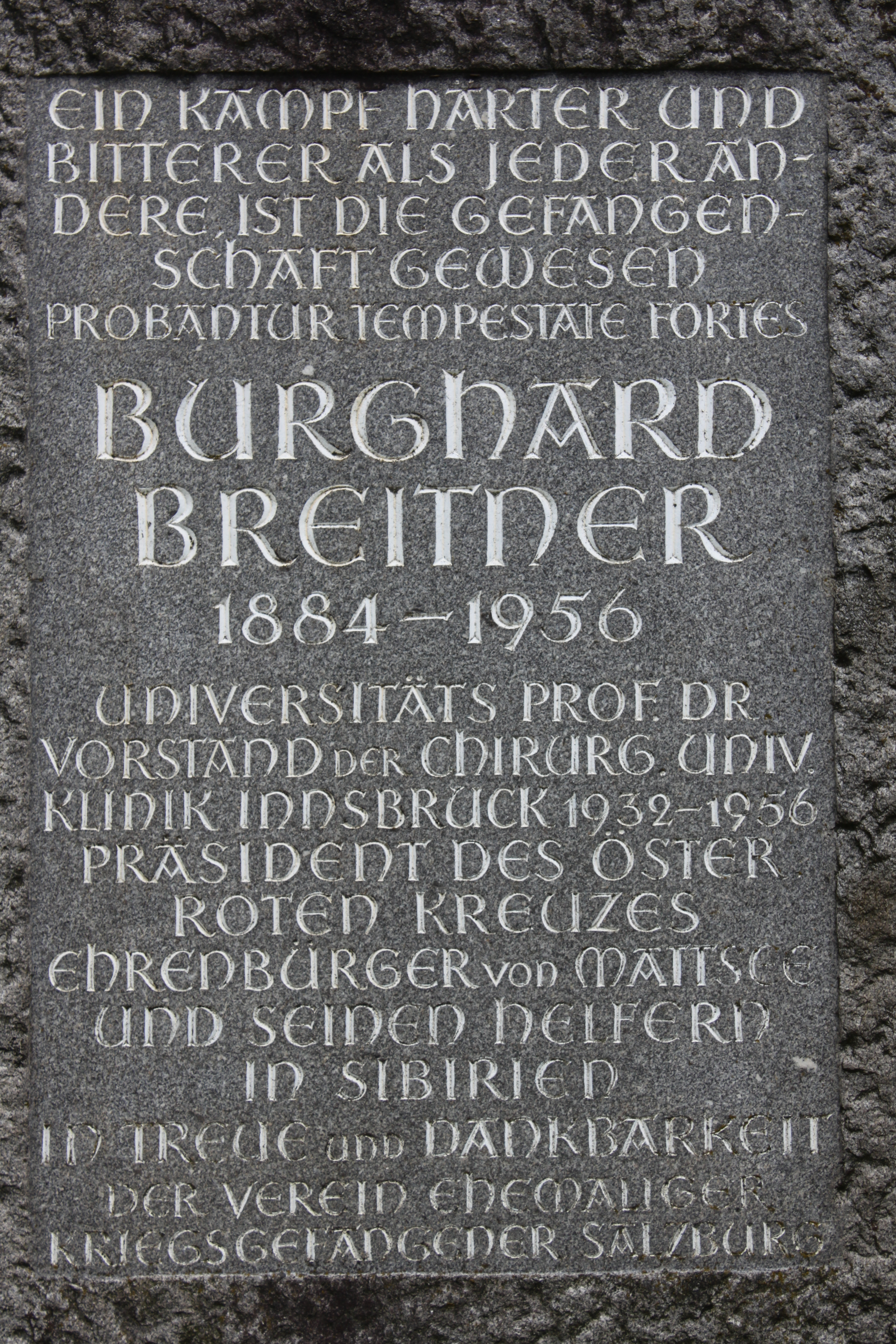
Burghard Breitner memorial in Mattsee. In the presidential elections of 1951, Breitner, a former Nazi, received 622,501 votes (15.4% of the electorate).

On the contrary, war veterans got the seat of honor. In 1949–1950 veteran societies (German: Kameradschaft) appeared spontaneously all over the country. For instance, by 1956 there were 56 veteran groupings in an under-populated region of Salzburg. In 1952 there were 300 groups uniting 60 thousand veterans in Styria. These societies had unequivocal support of all political parties without exception and they actively participated in local political life. War memorials that had been erected throughout the country – from the capital to small villages – became clear evidence of full rehabilitation of Wehrmacht soldiers and SS forces. The peak of their construction was in the years 1949–1950s. Mass meetings of veterans became commonplace. The ban of wearing of German military uniform, that had been introduced in 1945, was demonstratively violated everywhere. The Provisional Government nervously watched the rise of nationalism. On the one hand, veterans in Nazi uniform provoked the occupational powers; on the other hand, Austrian veterans made common cause with their German counterparts. The border of Austria and the FRG was practically open, threatening a new, spontaneous Anschluss that was disturbing for the Allies too. The government tried to prevent the statements of pro-German activists in the federal media, but did not dare to prosecute their political wing – the Federation of Independents. In the presidential elections of 1951 the former Nazi and the candidate of the Federation of Independents Burghard Breitner got more than 15% of votes.

In 1955 Austrians convinced the Allies to exclude any provisions of Austrian responsibility for Hitlerite crimes from the Austrian State Treaty established that year. Earlier, Israel had renounced its claims to Austria. After sovereignty had been recovered and the occupying troops had pulled out, the Austrian conservative rhetoric reached its climax. At last Austrians could openly express their attitude to the results of WWII: according to the "victim theory" of that period (1955–1962) the invasion of the victory states in 1945 was not a liberation, but a hostile occupation that superseded the Hitlerite one. From this point of view Austria had been a "victim" not only of Hitler, but also of the victorious occupiers. The first of federal politicians to express this opinion in public was Figl during the celebrations of the signing the Austrian State Treaty.

Austrian politicians thought that ultra-right forces would have quickly lost their influence in an independent state, but despite their estimations, the veteran movement increased rapidly and took up the role of defender of a society free from the "red threat" and promoter of the state ideology. The distinction between the Austrian Armed Forces and the veteran societies, as it seemed to foreign observers, was smoothed away: employed officers openly wore Hitlerite uniform, the veterans claimed to have a right to carry arms and to create an armed volunteer corps. The Social Democrats, who promoted the establishment of the Federation of Independents in 1949, were the first to realize the threat, but conservatives from the ÖVP prevented the attempts to restrain the veterans. Only in 1960 conservatives became concerned with the unpredictable behaviour of people dressed in Wehrmacht uniform, so Austria banned the wearing of the Swastika.

=== Conciliation ===
The fifteen years of Leopold Figl and Julius Raab's conservative governments maintained a full and uncompromising denial of guilt of Austria and the Austrians in Hitlerite crimes. In 1961 the power passed to the socialist government under Bruno Kreisky. Over the next several years (not later than 1962–1965), as the first post-war generation entered society, the state ideology softened. A process to return the Resistance heroes to the public conscience began. It was followed by a rival campaign of ultra-rightists with the opposite intent. A political dialogue within the firmly consolidated and inflexible ruling elite was still not possible: protesting sentiments started to manifest themselves in both cultural and scientific spheres. In 1963 historians and anti-fascists founded the national archive of the Resistance, in 1964 the federal government approved the construction of the first memorial for the victims of concentration camps in Mauthausen. Austrian society interpreted these cautious steps as a challenge for the dominating ultra-right views and resisted such "attempts to blacken the past". During the shooting of the musical film The Sound of Music, the plot of which unfolds just the times of the Anschluss and immediately after, the Authorities of Salzburg forbade the producers to decorate the streets of the city with Nazi symbols insisting that "there had never been Nazis in Salzburg". They retreated only after the producers threatened to use the true newsreels of the Nazi processions in Salzburg. The film had a worldwide success, but failed in Austria.

The death of a 67-year old anti-fascist Ernst Kirchweger, beaten to death on March 31, 1965, during a demonstration against Nazi professor Taras Borodajkewycz, catalyzed change. The subsequent demonstrations of protest were unexpectedly supported by all the federal-level politicians. The elite no longer had any need for the politics of the ultra-right. Moreover, being afraid of a spontaneous movement to an authoritarian dictatorship, the elite preferred to distance themselves from the ultra-right. In the same year the first memorial for anti-fascists constructed by the federal powers was opened in Hofburg. By the beginning of the 1970s the "victim theory" had mutated again. Anti-fascists were returned to the official pantheon, but the honoring of Wehrmacht soldiers was still predominant. Open antisemitism surrendered its position slowly: according to a 1969 poll the genocide of Jews was firmly approved by 55% of FPÖ electorate, 30% of ÖVP electorate and 18% of SPÖ electorate (the question was "Do you agree that during 1938-1945 the Jews got their come-uppance?"; the results of the "firmly agree" answer are given here); by 1985 these proportions decreased by 45%, 25% and 16% respectively. All the political parties viewed "everyday life" during the Nazi era with considerable tolerance, and they subsequently shaped it, intentionally or not, into legitimacy and even prestige.

The consensus reached in the 1960s was maintained into the following decade. The Protests of 1968 in Vienna, jokingly called "a tame revolution" (German: Eine zahme Revolution), had few consequences. The postwar generation of Austrians, as compared to Germans of the same age, appeared to be passive and did not try to review the past in the same active manner; this generation did not influence politicians, but rather followed them. The ruling Social Democrats, with the knowledge of Kreisky, continued both secret and obvious cooperation with former Nazis. Episodic protests against Nazi officials gave no results. In 1970 a minister of Kreisky's government, former Untersturmführer of the SS Johann Öllinger, was exposed by the West German press and had to resign. Instead Kreisky (a Jew himself, who escaped to Sweden in 1938) appointed another former Nazi in his stead, Oskar Weihs. In 1975 the case of a political ally of Kreisky, FPÖ president Friedrich Peter, who had been an officer in the 1 SS Infantry Brigade during WWII, was a turning point. Austrian politicians solidly supported Peter and condemned Simon Wiesenthal, who had exposed him. According to the opinion polls this viewpoint was supported by 59% of Austrians. Kreisky accused Wiesenthal of aiding and abetting the Gestapo and called Austrians to reconciliation: all of them, the Chancellor said, were the Nazis' victims.

== Practical implementation ==
=== End of denazification ===
Denazification in Austria in comparison with other counties was mild and smoothly transacted: there was nothing like the internal ideological conflict, leading to the civil war in Greece, or the political repressions experienced in Eastern Europe and Yugoslavia. Researchers pick out three or four stages of denazification:

- April – May 1945: the occupying powers took sole charge of the lustration (removal from office) and criminal prosecution of former Nazis;
- May 1945 – February 1946: Austrian "people's courts" (German: Volksgericht) worked simultaneously with the above;
- February 1946 – May 1948: Austrian powers carried out denazification alone.

During the whole period "people's courts" tried 137 thousand cases and passed 43 capital sentences, of which 30 were carried out. Another two death row inmates killed themselves in custody.

The American occupiers conducted denazification firmly and consistently: roughly 18 thousand prosecuted Nazis were convicted in the U.S. sector. During the whole period of the occupation the Soviet powers arrested and prosecuted approximately 2,000 Austrians, while another 1,000 of them were moved to the USSR for trial and penal consequences; about 200 of them were executed (for "espionage", as a rule). Many more Nazis were detained by the Soviet powers and then handed to Austrian authorities. In the beginning, the Soviet powers were prepared to "whitewash" the "less tainted" Nazis with the hope that they would help to reinforce the Austrian communist party resources. But after the latter was defeated at the November elections in 1945, the Soviet powers abandoned the idea to "export the revolution" to Austria and ceased to rely on the Austrian communist party. The British sector of occupation, Carinthia, was the one with the largest part of Nazis within the population. During the elections of 1949 rehabilitated Nazis made 18.8% of Carinthia electorate; this compared with 9.9% in Vienna and 8.7% in Lower Austria and Burgenland. Tensions between the bodies that prosecuted Hitlerites, and economic powers, that actively recruited former Nazi industrial and commercial managers, were never ending in the British sector. Mass lustration and post-war economic restoration appeared to be incompatible: there was not enough spotless people to fill all the urgent vacancies. One third of judges in the "people's courts" were former Nazis; 80%, according to Soviet claims, of the Austrian gendarmerie in the British sector were former Nazis. Austrian powers regularly reported about "full denazification" of one or another department, but in reality the "cleaned out" Nazis were simply transferred from one position to another. Political parties, including the Communists, actively accepted Nazis under their patronage and protected them from the occupational powers and rival parties using the principle "do not touch ours or we will attack yours".

After the Cold War started, the Austrian government used the dissension between the former Allies to promote a reconsideration of the value of denazification. In May 1948 it was discontinued and a 9-year "period of amnesties" of former Nazis started. The victory states preferred civil peace and stability to righting a wrong and secretly agreed with the Austrian viewpoint. In 1955 "people's courts" were dismissed, Nazis' cases were passed to courts of general jurisdiction, that in 1960 become notorious for verdicts of not guilty in resonant cases. In mid-70s the prosecution of Nazis was officially stopped.

=== Denial of financial restitution ===
In the second half of 1945, about 4500 surviving Jews returned to Vienna. Renner and his government, using the "victim theory" as a cover, refused to return them their property seized during the Nazi regime. All the responsibility to help former camp inmates was laid on to the Vienna Israelite Community and the "American Jewish Joint Distribution Committee". According to the Financial Aid Law of July 17, 1945 Austria only supported "active" (political) prisoners, but not "passive" victims of ethnic cleansing. This support was limited to a modest allowance; there was no question of compensations for losses. Politicians justified this rejection of restitution both with ideological clichés and the real weakness of the new state that was established from the ruins of the defeated Reich. According to Figl all that had happened in Austria was similar to a natural disaster. Austria was not capable of either recouping the losses or even easing the miseries of people who had suffered during those years.

Until the end of the 1990s, the public policy of the Second Republic in terms of restitution was defined by the "victim theory". Procrastination of legislative decisions on the matter and bureaucracy during their administration became an unwritten practical rule. The first to formulate it was the Minister of Internal Affairs Oscar Helmer (one of few politicians who have admitted the responsibility of Austrians) in 1945: "Ich bin dafür, die Sache in die Länge zu ziehen" ("I think that this question should be dragged out"). (Note: Helmer announced this on a closed session of the provisional government. For the first time these words were published by Robert Nite in 1988. His work provoked a new round of political discussion about Austrian evasion of responsibility.) All the legislative decisions concerning restitution were passed only under pressure from the allied occupational powers and later – after 1955 – by the US and Jewish social organizations. Austrian legislation has developed in fits and starts from one foreign policy crisis to another. In the beginning Austrians resisted and tried to develop another consensual decision, haggled for mutual concessions, (Note: For instance, in 1952 Austria made the recognition of Israel conditional on withdrawal of Israel's material charges to Austria.) and then silently sabotaged the decision. Successful completion of legislative initiatives to recognise rights of one or another group was determined by the political weight of its activists: for half a century the priority was to get pensions and allowances for Wehrmacht veterans. Jews and Roma got formal recognition in 1949, medical crimes victims – only in 1995, homosexuals and asexuals – in 2005.

As a result, Austrian law that regulated restitution to victims turned out to be a complicated and controversial "patchwork quilt" made of a multitude of acts on separate cases. The law of 1947 about social assistance to the victims of repressions had been corrected 30 times during 50 years. For some incidental points like the restitution of confiscated property Austrians formed a fair and fully-fledged legal basis as early as 1947. The other ones, like the lost rights of rented apartments, (Note: During 1938–1939 no less than 59 thousand apartments occupied by Jews were "aryanised" in Vienna alone. The restitution of the lost rights to rent as such was rejected by all the generations of Austrian politicians under the pretext that it should have required eviction of tens of thousands of new tenants, therefore leading to mass disorders. Only in 2000 Austria agreed to refund the lost rights to rent with 7000 USD for every lost apartment.) were left without any decision. All these laws referred not to public law, but to private civil law. Plaintiffs were obliged to prove their rights in Austrian civil courts that had an adverse policy (except a short period in the end of the 1940s). Even when the federal government had a fair mind to settle another dispute, (Note: Such as the case in the campaign of the Austrian Ministry of Culture to return several thousand pieces of art (1966–1972)) the state apparatus had no time to try all the claims. Probably neither politicians nor ordinary officials realised the real scale of Hitler's repressions.

=== Rewriting of history ===
For the Second Republic to survive it was necessary for the Austrians to establish their own national identity, and this needed to be created. As far back as the 1940s, a new, particular history of Austria had been urgently composed to satisfy this purpose: it introduced into existence a unique Austrian nation that differed from the German one. The heroes' pantheon of this history was made up of people that had no connection with Germany within the 20th century, e.g. Leopold the Glorious or Andreas Hofer. In 1946 a celebration of the 950-year anniversary of the ancient name of Austria (German: Ostarrichi) was right on the button. As Austrians were made up from a set of ancient nations then, according to Austrian historians, they were not Germans genetically The religion was also different: Austrians are mainly Catholics, Germans – Protestants. The consensual opinion of Austrian academics was that a common language could not be the determining factor.

During the first post-war decades historical perspectives within Austria, like the society as a whole, was separated into two-party columns – conservative and social-democratic, who however together wrote the consensual ("coalitionist", German: Koalitionsgeschichtsschreibung) history under administration of the party supervisors. Probably there was no alternative during those years: simply no humanitarian or ideological schools existed outside of the party camps. Both the schools fabricated the contemporary history in their own way, supporting the all-nation "victim" myth. Conservative historians hid Leopold Kunschak's antisemitism, social democrats were silent about Renner's sycophancy before Stalin and Hitler. The competing groups never tried to expose each other, they continued to mutually respect the party legends and taboos for three decades. Anton Pelinka thought that denying and silencing the historical reality allowed for the first time in history, a consolidation of society and healing of the wounds of the past.

In the 1970s historians, following the political order, focused on investigation of the interwar period; the Nazi regime being interpreted as absolution from sins of the First Republic and still within the boundaries of the "victim theory". Authors of the standard "History of Austria" (1977) Gorlich and Romanik stated that WWII belonged to world history, it was not an Austrian war because Austria as a state did not participate in it. Along with this, Austrian patriots knew that the path to Austrian national revival laid through Hitler's defeat. Austria's own history was considered separate to a common one with Germany; by 1980 the belief that a special, "non-German" national identity of Austrians had long existed, became firmly established. The Austrian lineage of Odilo Globocnik, Ernst Kaltenbrunner, Adolf Eichmann and other Nazi criminals was suppressed: the historians called them German occupiers. The only existing (as of 2007) monograph about denazification in Austria (Dieter Stiefel, 1981) described it as an unfounded and incompetent intervention of the victors into home affairs. Left-wing historians, in their turn, criticized the Allies for supposed suppression of a spontaneous anti-fascist movement, which had no appreciable influence in reality.

=== School syllabus ===
One of the methods to consolidate the ideology became the Austrian school syllabus, where the "victim" myth was closely interwoven with the myth about a special, non-German identity of Austrians. The highest goal of the Austrian school system became a patriotic education in a spirit of national union that required forgetting the immediate past and forgiving the past sins of all compatriots.

Textbooks presented the Anschluss as an act of German aggression against innocent "victims" and methodically shifted blame to other countries, who gave Austria up during the hard times. The first textbooks blamed the western countries for appeasement of Hitler. In the 1960s the USSR temporarily became the main villain whom Austrians fought against in a just war. Until the 1970s the existence of Austrian support for the Anschluss as well as Austrian Nazism was denied: according to the textbooks Austrian society was a solid mass, of which every member equally was a "victim" of foreign forces. Authors of a 1955 school reading book ignored the concept of Anschluss ('union'): Austria was literally presented as a victim of German military aggression, just like Poland or France. Books of the 1950s and 1960s mentioned the Holocaust rarely and in a reduced form of a minor episode. The topic of a traditional Austrian antisemitism and its role in the events of 1938–1945 were never discussed; from the authors' point of view the persecution of Jews had been an exclusive consequence of Hitler's personal animosity. In the 1960s a typical cliché of Austrian school curricula was the comparison of the Holocaust and Hiroshima or sometimes the Katyn massacre. But the description of the catastrophes in Hiroshima and Nagasaki were more prominent than the description of the events inside Austria itself. School impressed the idea that the Allies had not been any better than Axis powers, and Nazi crimes were not anything extreme.

The first textbooks to give a real, historical picture of events, not the myth, were published in Austria only in 1982 and 1983. Authors for the first time discussed the problem of antisemitism in their contemporary society and were first to admit that Hitlerite antisemitism had national, Austrian roots. Other textbooks of 1980s continued to diligently reproduce the "victim" myth. They mentioned the existence of concentration camps, but their description was reduced to just a political prosecution of a political enemies of Hitler; the books considered the camps as a place where consolidation of the national elite has happened, a personnel department of the Second Republic in its own way. The Holocaust was mentioned but was never classified as genocide; there were no absolute figures of exterminated people: Austrian school invented the "Holocaust without Jews". Only in the 1990s did textbook authors admit the real scale of the crimes, but they stood behind the comparison of the Holocaust with Hiroshima. The two catastrophes still co-existed and were continuously compared, and Austrians who committed evil acts were still presented as passive executors of foreign will.

== Historical role ==
All the countries that suffered under Nazi power tried more or less to forget their own past after the war. Ones that had a resistance movement glorified it, forgetting about collaborationism. Others, like Austria, preferred to consider themselves victims of the foreign aggression, although Austria, itself, did have a resistance movement (The Resistance in Austria, 1938–1945 Radomír Luza, University of Minnesota Press, 1984). According to the opinion of American political scientist David Art, the Austrian "white lies" about being a "victim" served four important purposes:

- For the first time in modern history the two rival political forces – conservatives and Social Democrats – united around this issue. The common rhetoric of being a "victim" allowed the country to forget the Civil War of the 1930s; mutual silence about the sins of the past helped to establish trust relationships between the two parties. The "big coalition" of conservatives, Social Democrats, church and trade unions, formed in the 1940s, ruled the country for almost half a century;
- The recognition of all Austrians as "victims" allowed the integration of the former Nazis (1/6 of all adults in the country) into social and political life;
- Distancing from the German "occupiers" was essential to build Austrian national identity. Austrians of the 1920s–1930s considered themselves Germans and being a part of the Reich for 8 years just confirmed their beliefs. Politicians of 1940s understood that the so-called "Austrian nation" never existed, but they needed an ideology to form a core of national identity – the "victim theory" solved the problem;
- The "victim theory" allowed the postponement and delay of restitution for half a century. Industrial assets that had been taken from Jews under Hitler and nationalized by the Second Republic, became part of the economic foundation of postwar Austria.

== Decline of the theory ==
=== Waldheim affair ===
In 1985 the ÖVP political party nominated the former UNSG Kurt Waldheim for the 1986 president election. During WWII Waldheim served as an intelligence officer in the Wehrmacht within the occupied territories of the USSR, Greece and Yugoslavia. West German and later Austrian and American journalists and the WJC accused Waldheim of being a member of Nazi organizations and of passive co-operation in punitive actions in the Balkans. Waldheim denied all the accusations and insisted that the campaign of defamation has been directed not towards him in person, but towards all his generation. The president of WJC Edgar Bronfman acknowledged this: "The issue is not Kurt Waldheim. He is a mirror of Austria. His lies are of secondary importance. The real issue is that Austria has lied for decades about its own involvement in the atrocities Mr. Waldheim was involved in: deportations, reprisal murders, and other [acts] too painful to think about". The Waldheim affair captivated the country, an unprecedented discussion about the military past developed in the press. At the beginning of it the conservatives, who absolutely dominated in Austrian media, formulated a new "victim theory" that was the first in history to apply to the patriotism of Austrians. From the right-wing's point of view, both Austria and Waldheim personally became victims of the campaign of defamation by the world Jewry, therefore support for Waldheim should be a duty for all patriots. The questions about a Hitlerite past were interpreted as an attack against the patriotic feelings of Austrians; the right-wingers insisted that during WWII Austrians behaved respectably, so digging the past up was unneeded and harmful.

The electoral campaign of Waldheim was built on a call to Austrian national feelings. Waldheim won the elections in the second round of voting, but he was not able to perform his main responsibility as the president of Austria – diplomatic representation. The USA and later European countries boycotted Waldheim. Austria gained a reputation as a promoter of Nazism and a foe to Israel. European organizations continuously criticized the country for its support of the Palestine Liberation Organization. In order to rehabilitate the president, the Austrian government founded an independent commission of historians. In February 1988 they confirmed accusations against Waldheim: while not being the direct executor or the organizer of war crimes, it was impossible for him not to know about them. The direct result of the Waldheim affair in home policy was the defeat of the social democrats and the factual break-up of the postwar two-party system. The Green Party appeared on the political scene and the radical right-wing FPÖ under Jörg Haider grew in strength. The system of mutual taboos collapsed and politicians were no more obliged to keep silent about rivals' affairs.

=== Left-wing opposition ===
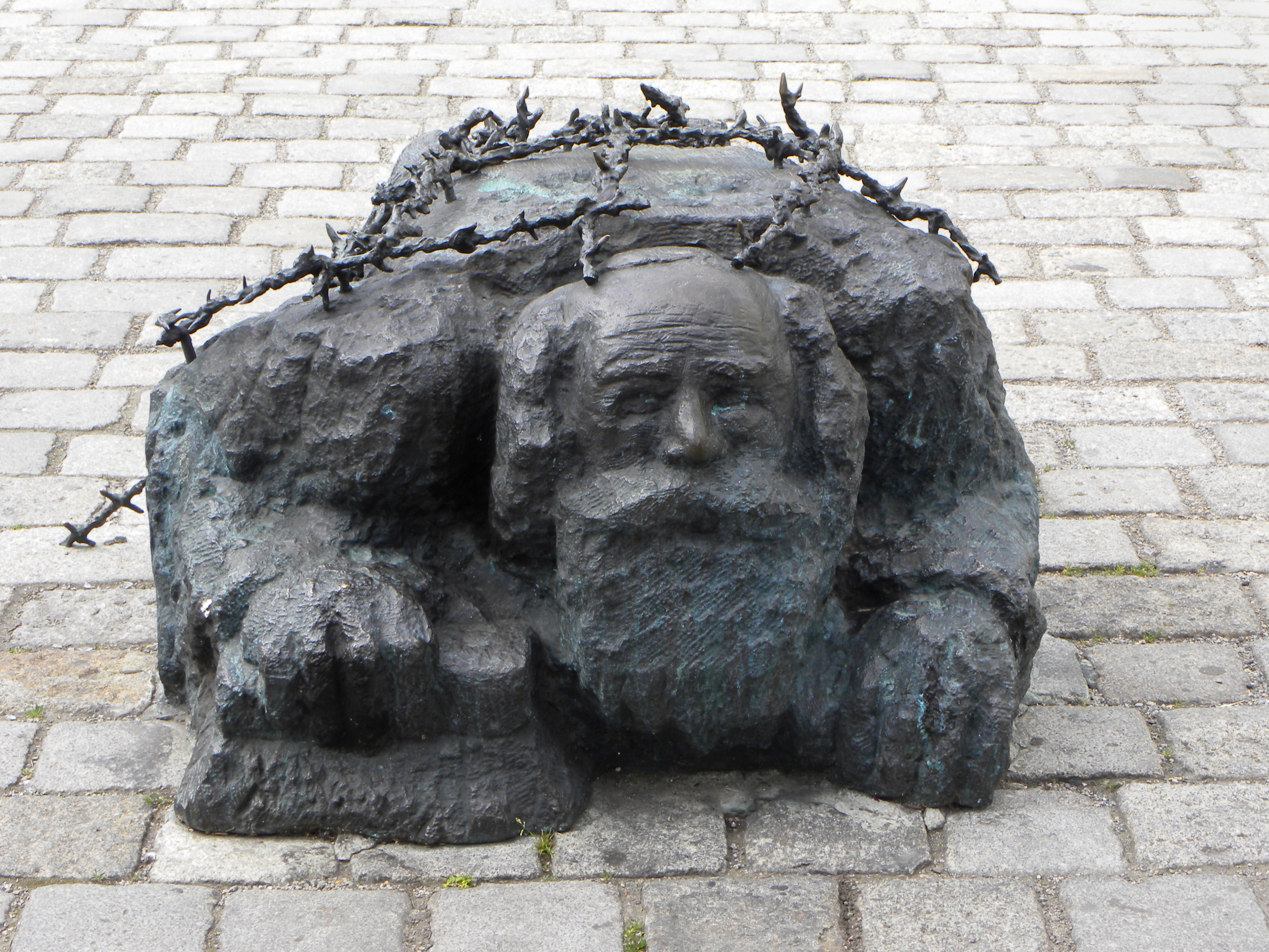
"A Jew forced to clean the street" – a part of the memorial against wars and fascism at Albertinaplatz, 1988

Domestic opposition to the ideology represented by Waldheim arose from the circles of liberal-left intellectuals, far from the political power of the influential mass media. During the latter decades of the 20th century, the left movement mobilized. In 1992, they called out more than 300,000 people to demonstrate against Jörg Haider. Scandals around Waldheim and Haider ended with the victory of the liberal-left school and a full revision of the former ideological guidelines. Authors of the generation of 1990s investigated the evolution of old prejudices and stereotypes (first of all anti-Semitism), disputed the role of the Resistance in the history of the country and analyzed the immoral, in their opinion, evasion by Austrian politicians by not admitting the responsibility of the nation. Attention of the researchers switched from the acts of individual Austrian politicians to previous campaigns against Roma and homosexuals. Critics of this school (Gabriele Matzner-Holzer, Rudolf Burger and others) stated that the left-wing authors tended to judge people of the past, using the moral norms existing at the end of the 20th century, and have not tried to clearly ascertain if it ever was really possible to repent in such a criminal society (German: Tätergesellschaft) steeped in Nazism as the Austria of the 1940s.

In the 1980s, the topic of Nazi crimes started getting covered regularly on television. Victims of Nazism who survived to the 1980s and who were previously afraid of speaking out, started to appear regularly on the screen both as witnesses of the past and as heroes in documentaries. In 1988 the memorial against wars and fascism (German: Mahnmal gegen Krieg und Faschismus) was opened under the walls of the Albertina in Vienna; in 1995 a public exhibition about the Wehrmacht (German: Wehrmachtsausstellung) became the event of the year and started a discussion of the previously untouchable topic of the almost half a million Austrians who fought on Hitler's side. A change of social sentiment resulted from the Austrian media turnaround: admission of the criminal past replaced the previous denial. At the beginning of the 1990s collective responsibility was admitted by only a small circle of intellectuals, politicians and left-wing youth; by the mid-2000s a majority of Austrians had gradually joined them.

=== Acknowledgement of liability ===
The abandonment of the "victim theory" by the Austrian state and gradual admittance of the responsibility began in 1988. Austria contributed to an existing fund for Nazi victims, established a new fund and for the first time in history made payments for benefit of emigrants, and widened the scope of legally recognized victims (in particular Roma and Carinthian Slovenes). These actions of the state were prompted both by changes in Austrian society and by the unparalleled crisis in foreign politics. During the whole of Waldheim's term of office (1986–1992) Austria's international situation deteriorated; governments of the US and Israel joined the pressure made by the Jewish diasporas as they did not want to admit such a 'Nazi country', which had also supported Yasser Arafat and Muammar Gaddafi, to the world political stage.

As early as 1987 Hugo Portisch, advisor of the federal chancellor Franz Vranitzky, recommended the government to immediately and unconditionally admit the responsibility of Austria and to apologize to the global Jewish community; Vranitzky concurred this opinion, but had no courage to act. Only in July 1991, one year before the end of Waldheim's term, when the political influence of Vranitzky and Social Democrats had noticeably increased, did the chancellor make a public apology on behalf of the nation and admit its responsibility (but not guilt) for the crimes of the past. But neither Americans nor Israelis were impressed by this cautious confession made inside the Austrian Parliament. Things started to move only after Vranitzky officially visited Israel in 1993; during his visit he admitted the responsibility not merely of the nation, but also of the state, but under the condition that the concept of a collective guilt was not applicable to Austrians. A year later public apologies were made by the new conservative president Thomas Klestil.

The "victim theory" had now been completely abandoned, at least at the level of the highest organs of government. Nobody has doubted the will of Vranitzky and Klestil, but sceptics doubted if the Austrian nation was ready to share their position. Conservative politicians had no desire to support this new ideology and the influence of the FPÖ party swiftly increased. The unification of the left and right happened only in 2000 during another crisis in foreign politics caused by the FPÖ's electoral victory. This time Austria was not only under pressure from the US and Jewish organizations but also the European Union. Unexpectedly, Austria's integration in the EU appeared to be more vulnerable than in the 1980s. Politicians had to make concessions once again: under the insistence of Klestil the leaders of the parliamentary parties signed another declaration on the Austrian responsibility and approved a new roadmap towards satisfying the claims of victims of National Socialism. The work of the Austrian Historical Commission (German: Österreichische Historikerkommission) resulted in admission of the economic "aryanization" of 1938–1941 as a part of the Holocaust (that was equal to unconditional consent for restitution); under the Washington Agreement signed with the Austrian government and industries, Austria admitted its debts towards Jews ($480 mln) and Ostarbeiters ($420 mln). For the first time in Austrian history, this program of restitution was fulfilled within the shortest possible time.

== See also ==
- The Holocaust in Austria
- German collective guilt
- Holocaust denial
- Italiani brava gente
- Official history
- Pseudohistory

== Sources ==
- Aly, Götz (2006). Hitler’s Beneficiaries: Plunder, Racial War, and the Nazi Welfare State. New York: Metropolitan Books. ISBN 978-0-80507-926-5.
- Art, D (2005). The Politics of the Nazi Past in Germany and Austria. Cambridge University Press. ISBN 978-1-139-44883-3.
- Bailer-Galanda, Brigitte (1997). "They Were All Victims: The Selective Treatment of the Consequences of National Socialism". Austrian Historical Memory and National Identity. Transactionpublishers. pp. 103–115. ISBN 978-1-4128-1769-1.
- Bailer, B (2011). "Restitution and Compensation of Property in Austria 1945-2007". New Perspectives on Austrians and World War II (Austrian Studies vol.I). Transactionpublishers. pp. 306–340. ISBN 978-1-4128-1556-7.
- Bekes, C.; et al. (2015). Soviet Occupation of Romania, Hungary, and Austria 1944/45–1948/49. Central European University Press. ISBN 978-963-386-075-5.
- Berg, M. P. (1997). "Challenging Political History in Postwar Austria: Veterans' Associations, Identity and the Problem of Contemporary History". Central European History. 30: 513–544. doi:10.1017/s0008938900015648. S2CID 143090676.
- Berger, T. (2012). War, Guilt, and World Politics after World War II. Cambridge University Press. ISBN 978-1-139-51087-5.
- Bischof, G. (2004). "Victims? Perpetrators? "Punching Bags" of European Historical Memory? The Austrians and Their World War II Legacies". German Studies Review. 27 (1): 17–32. doi:10.2307/1433546. JSTOR 1433546.
- Bischof, Günter; Pelinka, Anton (1997). Austrian historical memory & national identity. Transaction Publishers. ISBN 978-1-56000-902-3.
- Bukey, E. B. (2002). Hitler's Austria: Popular Sentiment in the Nazi Era, 1938–1945. University of North Carolina Press. ISBN 978-0-8078-5363-4.
- Bukey, E. B. (1983). "Hitler's Hometown under Nazi Rule: Linz, Austria, 1938-45". Central European History. 16 (2): 171–186. doi:10.1017/s0008938900013285. S2CID 145742746.
- Bundesministerium für Inneres (1951). "Bundespräsidentenwahl 1951" (PDF) (in German). Bundesministerium für Inneres.
- CVCE (27 April 1945). "Proclamation of the Second Republic of Austria". CVCE – Centre Virtuel de la Connaissance sur l'Europe. University of Luxembourg.
- Deak, I. (2006). "Political Justice in Austria and Hungary after World War Two". In Ed. J. Elster (ed.). Retribution and Reparation in the Transition to Democracy. Cambridge University Press. pp. 124–147. ISBN 978-1-107-32053-6.
- Embacher, H.; Ecker, M. (2010). "A Nation of Victims". The Politics of War Trauma: The Aftermath of World War II in Eleven European Countries. Amsterdam University Press. pp. 15–48. ISBN 978-90-5260-371-1.
- Feldbacher, Rainer; Guo, Shengda (2021). "The First World War and the Paris Peace Conference with a Special Focus on the 'Republic of Austria' – On the Shards of its Empire" (PDF). Global Academic Journal of Humanities and Social Sciences. 3 (1): 61–71. doi:10.36348/gajhss.2021.v03i01.008. ISSN 2706-901X.
- Geiss, Imanuel (1997). The Question of German Unification: 1806-1996. Routledge. ISBN 978-0-415-15049-1.
- Hammerstein, Katrin (2008). "Schuldige Opfer? Der Nationalsozialismus in der Grundungsmythen der DDR, Osterreichs und der Bundesrepublik Deutschland". In Regina Fritz; Carola Sachse; Edgar Wolfrum (eds.). Nationen und ihre Selbstbilder: Postdiktatorische Gesellschaften in Europa. Diktaturen und ihre Überwindung im 20. und 21. Jahrhundert (in German). Wallstein Verlag. pp. 39–61. ISBN 978-3-8353-0212-9.
- House of Lords (2 February 1943). "Position of Austrians". U.K. Parliament–House of Lords. p. col. 874.
- International Military Tribunal (1946). "Judgement: The Invasion of Austria". Trial of the Major War Criminals before the International Military Tribunal. Avalon Project, Yale Law School.
- Karn, A. (2015). Amending the Past: Europe's Holocaust Commissions and the Right to History. University of Wisconsin Press. ISBN 978-0-299-30554-3.
- Kansteiner, W. (2008). "Sold globally – remembered locally: Holocaust Cinema". Narrating the Nation: Representations in History, Media, and the Arts. Berghahn Books. pp. 153–180. ISBN 978-0-85745-412-6.
- Keyserlingk, R. (1990). Austria in World War II: An Anglo-American Dilemma. McGill-Queen's Press. ISBN 978-0-7735-0800-2.
- Knight, R. (2007). "Denazification and Integration in the Austrian Province of Carinthia". The Journal of Modern History. 79 (3): 572–612. doi:10.1086/517982. JSTOR 10.1086/517982. S2CID 143508858.
- Korostelina, K. (2013). History Education in the Formation of Social Identity. Palgrave Macmillan. ISBN 978-1-137-37476-9.
- Kühberger, Christoph (2023). "Was Austria the First Victim? Nazism in Austrian History Teaching". In Helfer, F.; Geiss, P.; Müller-Tietz, S.; Rohrschneider, M. (eds.). Overcoming Conflict. Wiesbaden: Springer VS. pp. 103–118. doi:10.1007/978-3-658-39237-6_6.
- Majstorovic, Vojin (20 September 2021). "The Soviet Occupation of Austria". The National WWII Museum.
- Monod, D. (2006). Settling Scores: German Music, Denazification, and the Americans, 1945–1953. University of North Carolina Press. ISBN 978-0-8078-7644-2.
- Niederacher, S. (2003). "The Myth of Austria as Nazi Victim, the Emigrants and the Discipline of Exile Studies". Austrian Studies. 11. 'Hitler's First Victim'? Memory and Representation in Post-War Austria: 14–32. doi:10.1353/aus.2003.0024. JSTOR 27944674. S2CID 245849342.
- Pelinka, A. (1988). "The Great Austrian Taboo: The Repression of the Civil War". New German Critique (43): 69–82. doi:10.2307/488398. JSTOR 488398.
- Pelinka, A. (1997). "The Second Republics Reconstruction of History". Austrian Historical Memory and National Identity. Transactionpublishers. pp. 95–103. ISBN 978-1-4128-1769-1.
- Pelinka, A. (1989). "SPO, OVP and the New Ehemaligen". In Ed. F. Parkinson (ed.). Conquering the Past: Austrian Nazism Yesterday & Today. Wayne State University Press. pp. 245–256. ISBN 978-0-8143-2054-9.
- Pick, Hella (2000). Guilty Victims: Austria from the Holocaust to Haider. I. B. Tauris. ISBN 978-1-86064-618-8.
- Polaschek, M. (2002). "Austrian and British trials over massacres of Jews at the end of World War II". In Bischof, Günter; Pelinka, Anton; Gehler, Michael (eds.). Austria in the European Union. Contemporary Austrian studies. Routledge. pp. 298–308. ISBN 978-1-4128-1764-6.
- Poltavsky, M. A. (1973). Дипломатия империализма и малые страны Европы [The Diplomacy of Imperialism and the Small Countries of Europe] (in Russian). Moscow: Международные отношения.
- Riedlsperger, M. E. (1989). "FPO: Liberal or Nazi?". In Ed. F. Parkinson (ed.). Conquering the Past: Austrian Nazism Yesterday & Today. Wayne State University Press. pp. 257–278. ISBN 978-0-8143-2054-9.
- Riekmann, S. (1999). "The Politics of Aufgrenzung, the Nazi Past and the European Dimension of the New Radical Right in Austria". Contemporary Austrian Studies: The Vranitzky Era in Austria. Transactionpublishers. pp. 78–105. ISBN 978-1-4128-4113-9.
- Ritter, H. (1992). "Austria and the Struggle for German Identity". German Studies Review. 15: 111–129. doi:10.2307/1430642. JSTOR 1430642.
- Schwarz, Egon (2004). "Austria, Quite a Normal Nation". New German Critique (93): 175–191. JSTOR i387672.
- Sheehan, James J. (1993). German History, 1770–1866. Oxford University Press. ISBN 978-0-19-820432-9.
- Steininger, Rolf (2008). Austria, Germany, and the Cold War: from the Anschluss to the State Treaty 1938–1955. Berghahn Books. ISBN 978-1-84545-326-8.
- Steininger, Rolf (2012). Austria, Germany, and the Cold War: From the Anschluss to the State Treaty, 1938–1955. Berghahn Books. ISBN 978-0-85745-598-7.
- Stuhlpfarrer, K. (1989). "Nazism, the Austrians and the Military". In Ed. F. Parkinson (ed.). Conquering the Past: Austrian Nazism Yesterday & Today. Wayne State University Press. pp. 190–206. ISBN 978-0-8143-2054-9.
- The New York Times (20 February 1938). "Austria Falls a Victim to Overwhelming Force: Threatened by Hitler, a Nation Yields". The New York Times.
- Uhl, Heidemarie (1997). "Austria's Perception of the Second World War and the National Socialist Period". Austrian Historical Memory and National Identity. Transactionpublishers. pp. 64–94. ISBN 978-1-4128-1769-1.
- Uhl, H. (2006). "From Victim Myth to Coresponsibility Thesis". The Politics of Memory in Postwar Europe. Duke University Press. pp. 40–72. ISBN 978-0-8223-3817-8.
- Uhl, H. (2013). "From Discourse to Representation: Austrian Memory in Public Space". Narrating the Nation: Representations in History, Media, and the Arts. Berghahn Books. pp. 207–222. ISBN 978-0-85745-412-6.
- Utgaard, P. (1999). "Remembering and Forgetting the Holocaust in Austrian Schools 1955–1996". Contemporary Austrian Studies: The Vranitzky Era in Austria. Transactionpublishers. pp. 201–215. ISBN 978-1-4128-4113-9.
