= Centro Cultural Gabriela Mistral =

Coordinates: 33°26′20.70″S 70°38′23.02″W

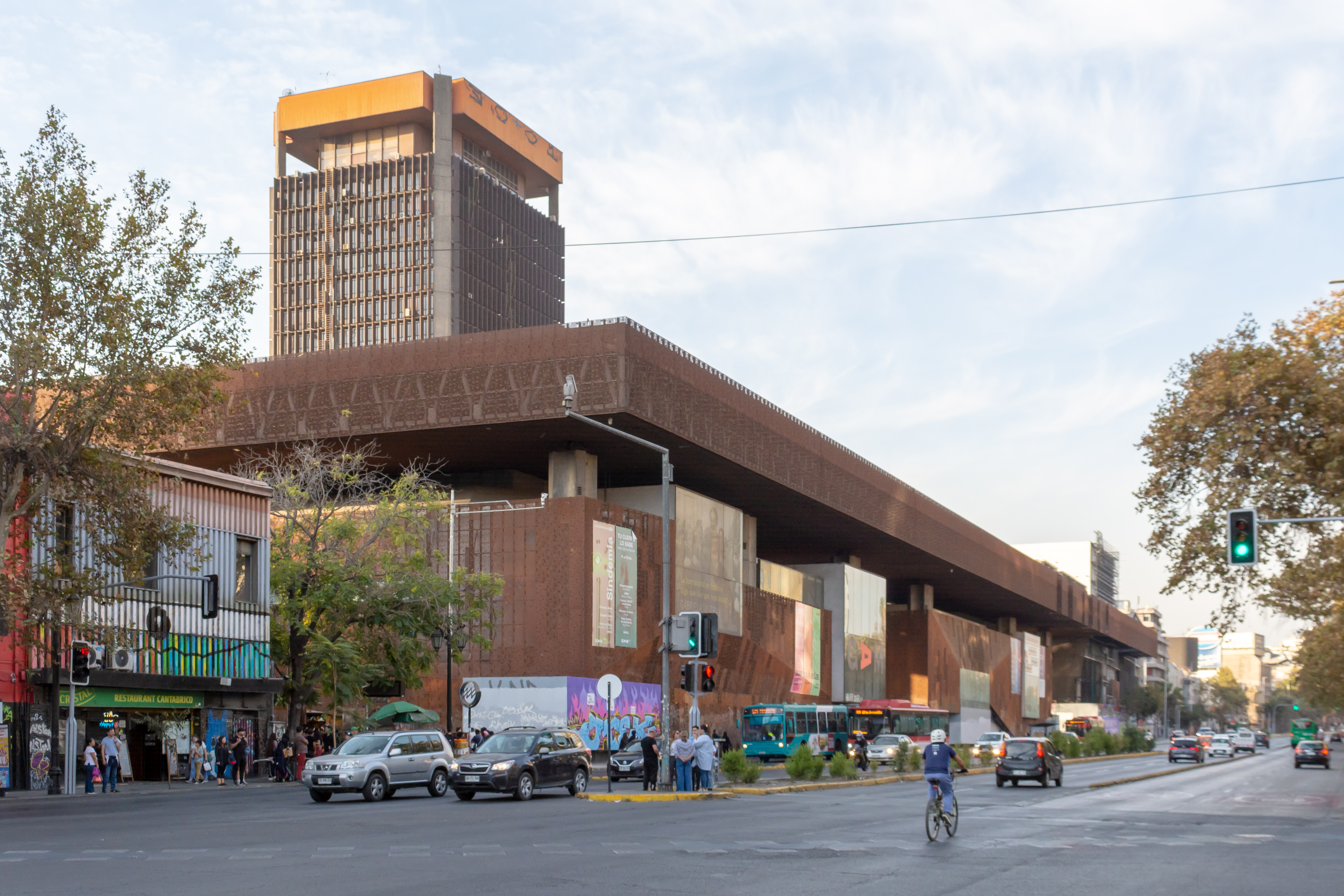
Gabriela Mistral Cultural Center in 2023

The Centro Cultural Gabriela Mistral (GAM) (formerly known as the Diego Portales Building) is a cultural centre located at 227 Av. Libertador Bernardo O'Higgins, in Santiago de Chile. The complex was originally built to serve as the headquarters for the third UNCTAD conference, which was held in Santiago in 1972, and consisted of a convention centre and an adjoining 22-story building. The building was finished in only 275 days in a significant effort supported by several thousand volunteers. This effort was part of a propaganda initiative performed by the socialist government of Salvador Allende. After the conference, the building was used as a cultural center until the 1973 Chilean coup d'état. During the 1980's and 1990's, the building was known as the Edificio Diego Portales (Diego Portales building) and used as a military headquarters, where it was guarded and not open to the public. After the end of the Pinochet regime, it hosted a number of conventions and the adjacent tower became the main building for the Ministry of National Defense. In early 2006, a fire destroyed parts of the building, which led the government of Michelle Bachelet to rethink the original sense of the building and return it to a cultural centre.

The Centro Cultural Gabriela Mistral was inaugurated in September 2010 and is named after Gabriela Mistral. It offers contemporary drama, dance, and music. The GAM houses a range of visual arts.

== See also ==
- UN Trade and Development III
