= 1986 Austrian presidential election =

- 4 May 1986 (first round); 8 June 1986 (second round)
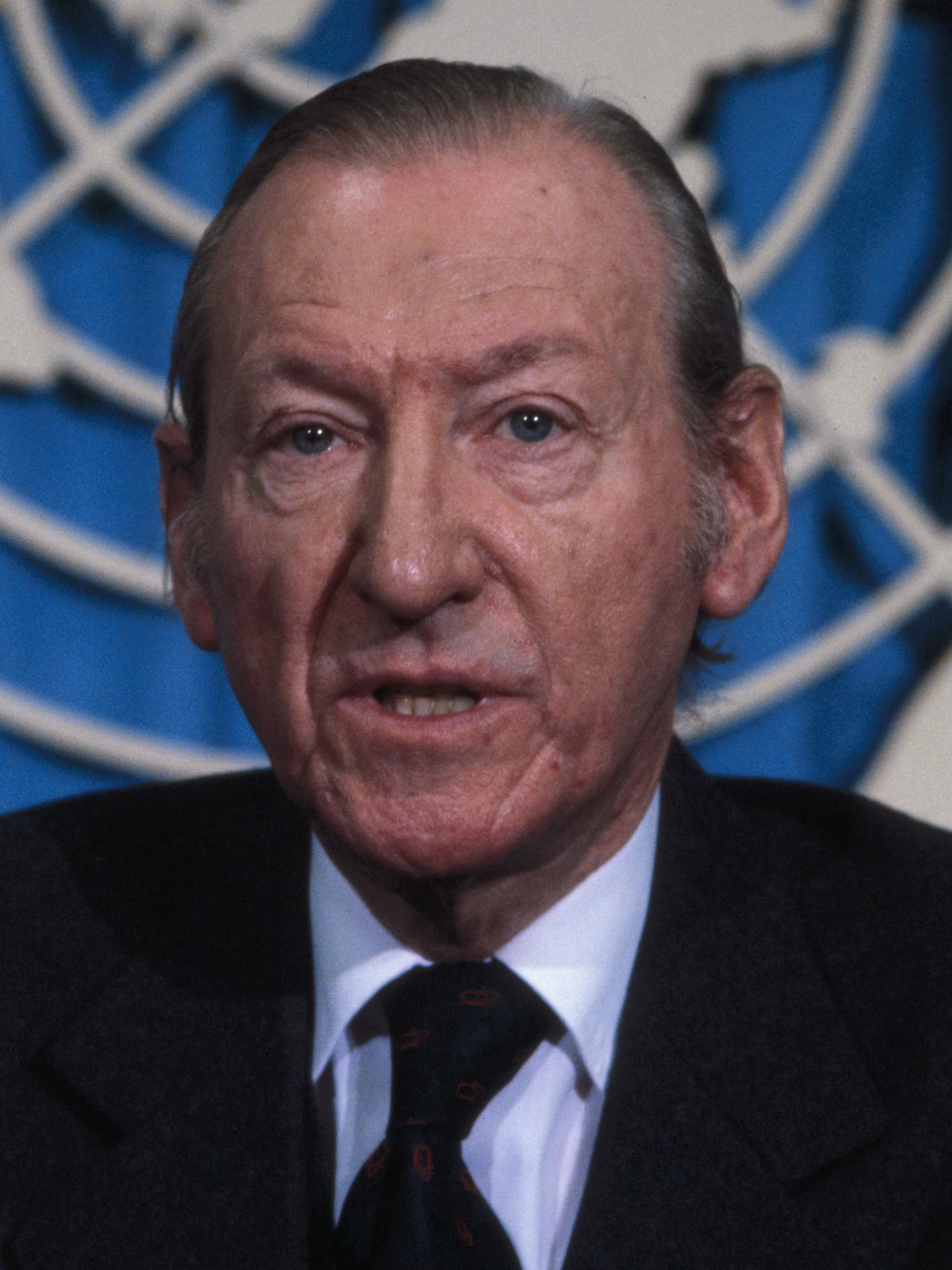

Nominee	Kurt Waldheim	Kurt Steyrer
Party	Independent (ÖVP)	SPÖ
Popular vote	2,464,787	2,107,023
Percentage	53.91%	46.09%
President before election
Rudolf Kirchschläger
SPÖ
Elected President
Kurt Waldheim
Independent (ÖVP)

Presidential elections were held in Austria on 4 May 1986 with a second round on 8 June 1986. Kurt Waldheim, former Secretary-General of the United Nations, endorsed by the Austrian People's Party (ÖVP) was elected, the first time the ÖVP had won a direct presidential election. Following Waldheim's victory, Chancellor Fred Sinowatz and other government members of the defeated Socialist Party stepped down, including the Minister of Foreign Affairs Leopold Gratz, who said he refused to "direct the Austrian foreign service in the defense of President Waldheim." The revelation of Waldheim's service in Greece and Yugoslavia, as an intelligence officer in Nazi Germany's Wehrmacht during World War II, caused international controversy.

== Results ==
Candidate	Party	First round		Second round	
Candidate	Party	Votes	%	Votes	%
Kurt Waldheim	Independent (ÖVP)	2,343,463	49.65	2,464,787	53.91
Kurt Steyrer	Socialist Party of Austria	2,061,104	43.67	2,107,023	46.09
Freda Meissner-Blau	Green Party	259,689	5.50		
Otto Scrinzi	Freedom Party of Austria	55,724	1.18		
Total		4,719,980	100.00	4,571,810	100.00
Valid votes		4,719,980	97.02	4,571,810	96.33
Invalid/blank votes		144,729	2.98	174,039	3.67
Total votes		4,864,709	100.00	4,745,849	100.00
Registered voters/turnout		5,436,846	89.48	5,436,846	87.29
Source: Ministry of Interior
