= UN Trade and Development III =

United Nations conference held in 1972

- United Nations Conference on Trade and Development Santiago 1972

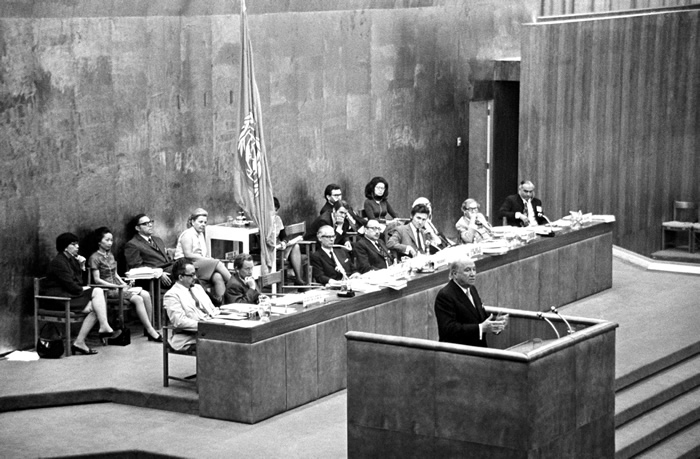
- View of the podium in the plenary hall during the opening of UNCTAD III (April 13, 1972)
- Native name: Conferencia de las Naciones Unidas sobre Comercio y Desarrollo Santiago 1972
- Date: April 1 – May 21, 1972
- Venue: Gabriela Mistral Cultural Center
- Location: Santiago, Chile
- Type: Conference
- Organised by: United Nations
- Participants: 141 countries
- Secretary-General: Kurt Waldheim
- Recorded by: Televisión Nacional de Chile

UN Trade and Development III (UNCTAD III), the acronym for the Third United Nations Conference on Trade and Development, was an event held in Santiago, Chile from April 13 to May 21, 1972.

== Background ==
The UNCTAD was established in 1964, primarily in order to promote increased connection among third-world and developing countries. The first two conferences in Geneva and New Delhi had failed to create any significant change, and as a result a divide had grown between many developing nations (known as the "Group of 77") and many developed countries.

== Venue ==
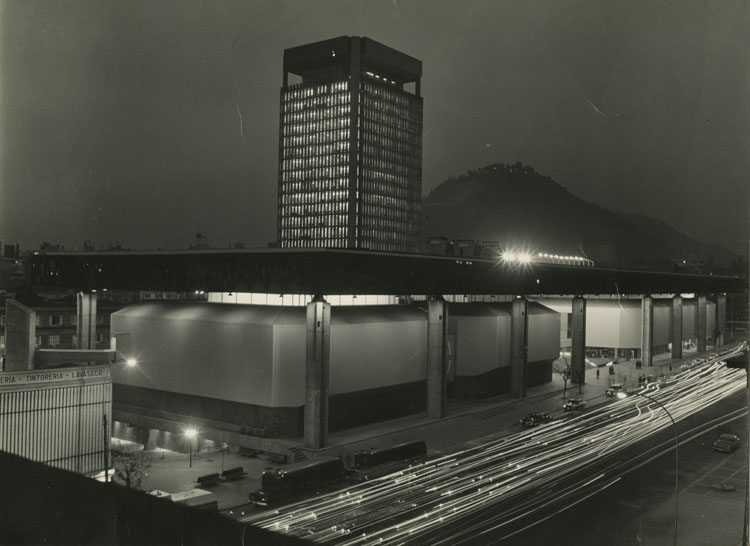
Building constructed to host UNCTAD III

Santiago de Chile was chosen as the site for the third UNCTAD conference on March 5, 1971; it was originally planned that the event would be held in Geneva, Switzerland, which generated reluctance from African and Asian countries. In response, Hernán Santa Cruz, head of the Chilean delegation to UNCTAD, proposed to the President of Chile, Salvador Allende, and the Minister of Foreign Affairs, Clodomiro Almeyda, that the conference be held in the Chilean capital. They accepted, and the bid was approved by a large majority in the United Nations General Assembly.

The building to host UNCTAD III was designed by architects José Covacevic, Hugo Gaggero, Juan Echenique, José Medina, and Sergio González Espinoza, and thousands of volunteers were recruited for the rapid execution of the construction work, which was completed in 275 days. Work began on June 1, 1971, with initial demolitions and excavations, while foundation work on the buildings started on July 14, and the roofing ceremony was held on October 30. The architectural complex was officially received on April 3, 1972, the date on which it was handed over to the United Nations (UN) for the holding of the conference.

== Development ==
The inaugural ceremony of UNCTAD III was held in the Plenary Hall of the building at 11:00 a.m. on April 13, 1972, an event headed by President Salvador Allende, the Secretary-General of the United Nations, Kurt Waldheim, and the Secretary-General of UNCTAD, Manuel Pérez Guerrero. The same day, at 3:00 p.m., the first plenary session began, headed by the provisional president, Lalit Narayan Mishra (India), in which Clodomiro Almeyda (Chile) was elected as president, along with Jean Pierre Martin as Secretary of Organization, Manuel Pérez Guerrero as Secretary-General, and Stein Rossen as Deputy Secretary; the boards of each commission and working group were also appointed, being constituted as follows:

| Commission/Working Group | President | Vice-president | Rapporteur |
|---|---|---|---|
| First Commission | Siaka Coulibaly (Ivory Coast) | S. Thepsithar (Thailand) | S. Shershnev (Soviet Union) |
| Second Commission | Dominique Laloux (Belgium) | M. Fall (Senegal) | L. V. Nogueira Magalhaes (Brazil) |
| Third Commission | Magne Reed (Norway) | Gabriel Rosas (Colombia) | Sherif Lotfy (Egypt) |
| Fourth Commission | C. P. Srivastava (India) | Dimitar Popov (Bulgaria) | Edmond J. Antoun (United States) |
| Fifth Commission | Ladislav Smid (Czechoslovakia) | T. F. Ogrinz (Austria) | F. Al-Obaidi (Iraq) |
| Sixth Commission | Elíseo Mendoza (Mexico) | Pushkar Nath Pant (Nepal) | Arba Hama Diallo (Upper Volta) |
| Working Group I | Hortencio Brillantes (Philippines) | Barna Talas (Hungary) (Note: Later replaced by Janos Nyerges (Hungary).) | José Luis Pérez (Spain) |
| Working Group II | J. B. Kelegama (Ceylon) | Abdel Wahab Tamin (Sudan) | Cyril Seeram (Trinidad and Tobago) |
| Working Group III | L. D. Thompson (Australia) | Julio Eguino Ledo (Bolivia) | Vicente Sánchez (Chile) |

A health post, belonging to the Asistencia Pública, was set up in the UNCTAD III building, providing medical services to conference attendees; working in shifts, three doctors, two nurses, two nursing assistants, an administrative employee, and an ambulance driver attended the facility. The Postal and Telegraph Service issued a commemorative stamp for the conference, consisting of two stamps with denominations of 1.15 and 6 escudos and with a print run of 10 million copies of the first stamp and 3 million copies of the second, while Televisión Nacional de Chile provided continuous coverage of the sessions through a studio set up in the UNCTAD III building from which a segment of the news program Noticiero was broadcast, hosted by Sergio Silva. Cocema, an institution that among other activities organized craft galleries, held an exhibition of Chilean handicrafts in the basement of the UNCTAD building.

Initially, UNCTAD III was scheduled to be closed on May 19; however, its official closing took place on the 21st of the same month when the conference president, Clodomiro Almeyda, delivered his final report; on the 20th, the entry of Bangladesh into UNCTAD was formally announced, thereby increasing the conference to 142 participating nations.

== Related events ==
Parallel to the holding of UNCTAD III, various works were carried out to receive the delegates attending the conference. Among these was the expansion of the facilities at Pudahuel Airport, which took place between December 1971 and April 1972; the expansion works included the main passenger terminal, the customs area, and cargo warehouses.

On April 16, 1972, the Enoteca on San Cristóbal Hill was inaugurated as a way to show the delegates attending UNCTAD III the different varieties of wines and liquors produced in Chile. On May 15, Chilexpo (National Exhibition of Chile) was inaugurated in Quinta Normal Park, aimed at showcasing the country's various productive activities.

Parallel to the conference, the First Meeting of Christians for Socialism was held in Santiago, bringing together 400 delegates from all Latin American countries, plus observers from the United States, Canada, and Europe. On April 16, the "Petropol" theater room was inaugurated, installed in La Casa de la Luna Azul on Villavicencio Street, and managed by mime artist Enrique Noisvander.

== See also ==
- Presidency of Salvador Allende
