= Lujo Tončić-Sorinj =

Austrian diplomat and politician

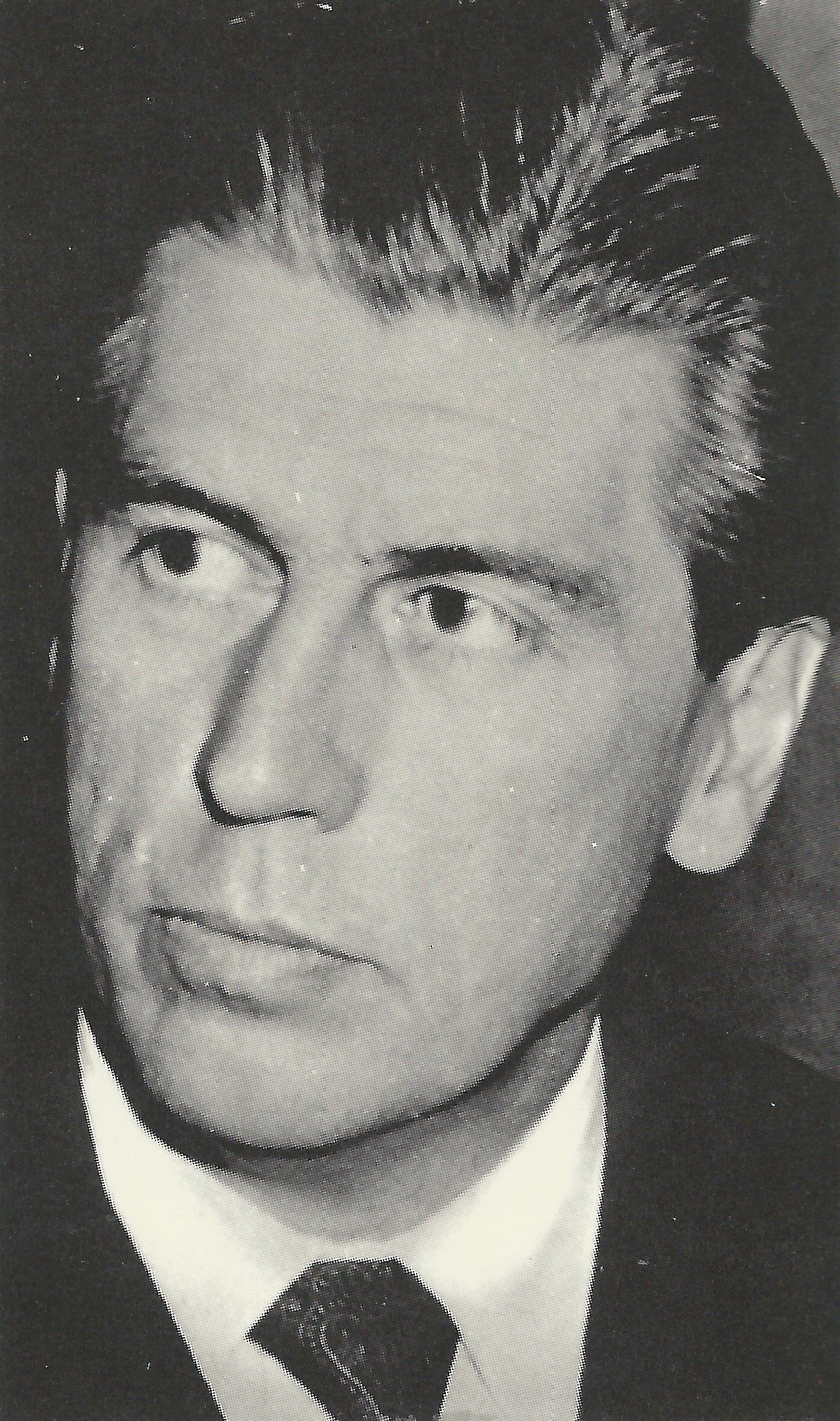
- Tončić-Sorinj in 1960

Foreign Minister of Austria
- In office 19 April 1966 – 19 January 1968
- Chancellor: Josef Klaus
- Preceded by: Bruno Kreisky
- Succeeded by: Kurt Waldheim

Secretary General of the Council of Europe
- In office 16 September 1969 – 16 September 1974
- Preceded by: Peter Smithers
- Succeeded by: Georg Kahn-Ackermann

Personal details
- Born: 12 April 1915 Vienna, Austria-Hungary
- Died: 20 May 2005 (aged 90) Salzburg, Austria
- Party: Austrian People's Party

Lujo Tončić-Sorinj (Croatian pronunciation: [lujɔ tɔntʃitɕ sɔriɲ]; 12 April 1915 – 20 May 2005) was an Austrian diplomat and politician of the conservative Austrian People's Party (ÖVP). He served as Foreign Minister from 1966 to 1968 and as Secretary General of the Council of Europe from 1969 to 1974.

== Life ==
Born in the Austro-Hungarian capital Vienna, he was a member of a Croatian family ennobled in 1911. His paternal grandfather Josip Tončić-Sorinj (1847–1931) had been governor in the Kingdom of Dalmatia, his father served as consul in Jeddah. Tončić-Sorinj attended the Gymnasium in Salzburg and, having obtained his Matura degree, went on to study law, philosophy and Slavistics at the Vienna University and the University of Zagreb. During World War II, he taught languages in a signal corps of the Luftwaffe.

In 1945, Tončić-Sorinj became chairman of the political department of the Austrian Institute for the Economy and Politics in Salzburg, and he joined the newly created ÖVP. Later he was member of the Austrian UNESCO commission and of the Austrian delegation to the advisory convention of the Council of Europe. From 1949 to 1966, he was member of the Austrian National Council parliament for the ÖVP, from 1966 to 1968 he was foreign minister in the cabinet of Chancellor Josef Klaus. Relying on the 1946 Gruber–De Gasperi Agreement, Minister Tončić-Sorinj played a vital role in the negotiations with Italy over the autonomy of South Tyrol. A new Austro-Italian agreement was finally achieved under his successor Kurt Waldheim. Also, Tončić-Sorinj initiated the implementation of the United Nations Office at Vienna (UNOV), with the Vienna International Centre built from 1973 onwards as one of four major UN office sites. From 1969 to 1974, he was Secretary General of the Council of Europe.

After the Revolutions of 1989 and the Breakup of Yugoslavia, Tončić-Sorinj strongly supported the independence of Croatia. In 1992 he decided to take the Croatian citizenship because of his family connections to Dalmatia, but as a result he lost Austrian citizenship. With help from his political party, he became an Austrian citizen again.

Political offices
Preceded by: Bruno Kreisky	Foreign Minister of Austria; 1966–1968	Succeeded by: Kurt Waldheim
Preceded by: Peter Smithers	Secretary General of the Council of Europe; 1969–1974	Succeeded by: Georg Kahn-Ackermann
