= Kurt Steyrer =

Austrian politician (1920–2007)

Kurt Steyrer (June 3, 1920 – July 16, 2007) was an Austrian politician, health minister and Social Democratic Party presidential candidate.

Steyrer was born on June 3, 1920, in the city of Linz. He studied medicine in Vienna and Prague before opening up his own practice in dermatology. His medical background paved the way for him to serve as the health and environment minister of Austria.

Steyrer was one of the leaders of the Social Democratic Party of Austria. He ran unsuccessfully as the Social Democratic candidate for president of Austria in 1986, losing to former UN Secretary-General Kurt Waldheim.

Steyrer died in Vienna in 2007 after a brief illness. His death was initially reported by the Austria Press Agency and the ORF. Waldheim, his 1986 presidential opponent, died a little more than a month before Steyrer in June 2007.
