= Kurt Waldheim =

Austrian diplomat and politician (1918–2007)

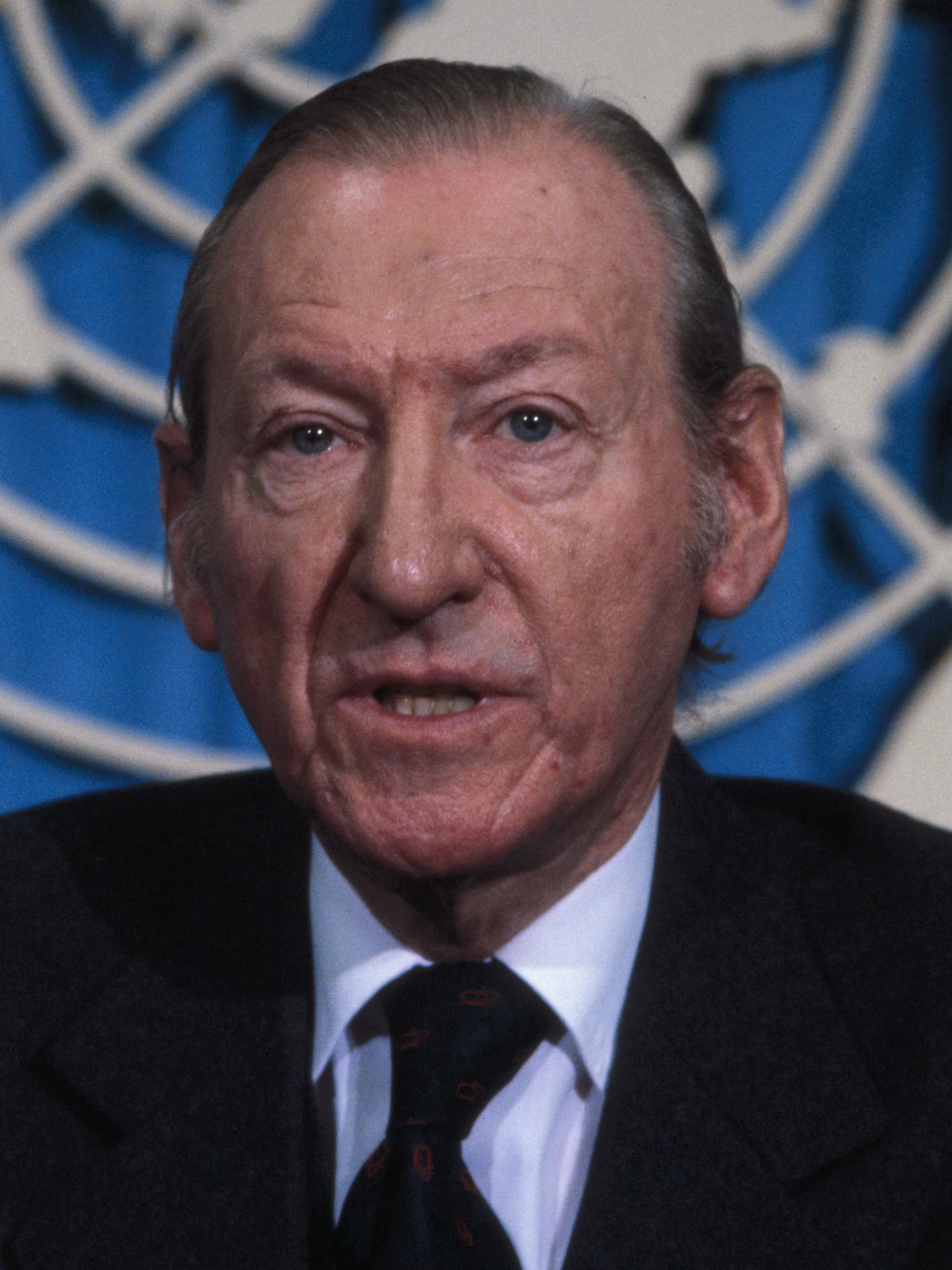
- Waldheim in 1981

4th Secretary-General of the United Nations
- In office 1 January 1972 – 31 December 1981
- Preceded by: Thant
- Succeeded by: Javier Pérez de Cuéllar

8th President of Austria
- In office 8 July 1986 – 8 July 1992
- Chancellor: Franz Vranitzky
- Preceded by: Rudolf Kirchschläger
- Succeeded by: Thomas Klestil

Minister of Foreign Affairs
- In office 19 January 1968 – 21 April 1970
- Chancellor: Josef Klaus
- Preceded by: Lujo Tončić-Sorinj
- Succeeded by: Rudolf Kirchschläger

Personal details
- Born: 21 December 1918 Wördern, Republic of German-Austria
- Died: 14 June 2007 (aged 88) Vienna, Republic of Austria
- Party: Austrian People's Party
- Spouse: Elisabeth Ritschel (m. 1944)
- Children: 3
- Education: Vienna Consular Academy; University of Vienna
- Profession: Lawyer; diplomat

Military service
- Allegiance: Austria (1936–1937); Nazi Germany (1941–1945)
- Branch/service: Austrian Armed Forces; German Army
- Rank: Oberleutnant
- Unit: 5 Alpine Division Pusteria; Kampfgruppe West; 9th Army; 11th Italian Army; Army Group E
- Battles/wars: World War II; Eastern Front; Balkan Front; Kozara Offensive
- Awards: Iron Cross 2nd Class; Medal of the Crown of King Zvonimir
- Waldheim's voice Recorded greeting for the Voyager Golden Record; Recorded 1977

Kurt Josef Waldheim (Austrian German: [kʊrt ˈvaldhaɪm]; 21 December 1918 – 14 June 2007) was an Austrian politician and diplomat. Waldheim was the secretary-general of the United Nations from 1972 to 1981 and the president of Austria from 1986 to 1992.

While he was running for the latter office in the 1986 election, the revelation of his service in Greece and Yugoslavia during World War II, and of his knowledge of Nazi atrocities as an intelligence officer in Nazi Germany's Wehrmacht, raised international controversy.

== Early life and education ==
Waldheim was born in Wördern (from 1972 Sankt Andrä-Wördern), near Vienna, Republic of German-Austria on 21 December 1918. He was the eldest child of Walter Watzlawik, a schoolmaster of Czech origin, and his wife Josefine Petrasch. Watzlawik (original Czech spelling Václavík) changed his name to "Waldheim" that year as the Habsburg monarchy collapsed and eventually rose to become superintendent of schools for the Tulln District, attaining the rank of Regierungsrat (government councillor). Active in the Christian Social Party, he was well regarded as a devoutly Catholic family man. Waldheim and his two younger siblings, a brother, Walther, and a sister, Gerlinde, enjoyed a comfortable middle-class upbringing. From his youth, Waldheim was distinguished by his unusual height of 1.92 m (6 ft 4 in). As a gymnasium student in Klosterneuburg, he excelled at languages and was a competent violinist in the school orchestra, also enjoying swimming, boating and tennis.

Although his father wanted him to study medicine, Waldheim had an aversion to the sight of blood, and had already decided to enter the foreign service. In March 1936, the Schuschnigg government passed a law mandating a period of military service for prospective civil servants. Consequently, following his graduation Waldheim volunteered for a 12-month term of enlistment in the Austrian Army, and was posted to the 1st Dragoon Regiment on his 18th birthday. In the autumn of 1937, now an army reservist, Waldheim entered the prestigious Consular Academy in Vienna on a scholarship, where he began his studies in law and diplomacy. Along with his family, Waldheim opposed the German annexation of Austria in 1938, and while actively campaigning against it in Vienna was attacked and injured by Austrian Nazis. Following the annexation, Waldheim's father was briefly arrested by the Gestapo and dismissed from his post, while Waldheim's scholarship was cancelled. He managed to continue his studies by working as a Latin and Greek tutor and borrowing funds from relatives.

Waldheim applied for membership in the National Socialist German Students' League (NSDStB), a division of the Nazi Party. He joined the Reiter-SA or Mounted SA (SA Mounted Standard 5/90) on 18 November 1938.

In March/April 1944, Waldheim received his doctorate in law from the University of Vienna. He used an approved study leave from the Balkan front (from 25 February to 16 April 1944) to complete his dissertation on the “Reich idea with Konstantin Frantz” at the Faculty of Law and Political Science. Shortly after graduating, he returned to his staff assignment under Alexander Löhr.

On 19 August 1944, he married Elisabeth Ritschel in Vienna; their first daughter, Lieselotte, was born the following year. A son, Gerhard, and another daughter, Christa, followed.

== Military service in World War II ==
In early 1941, Waldheim was conscripted into the Wehrmacht, the armed forces of Nazi Germany, specifically to the Heer (Army), and posted to the Eastern Front where he served as a squad leader. In December, he was wounded but returned to service in 1942. His service from 1942 to 1945 was the subject of international review in 1985 and 1986. In his 1985 autobiography, he claimed that he was discharged from further service at the front and, for the remainder of the war, finished his law degree at the University of Vienna, in addition to marrying in 1944. After publication, documents and witnesses came to light that revealed Waldheim's military service continued until 1945, during which time he rose to the rank of Oberleutnant der Reserve.

=== Service in Yugoslavia and Greece ===
Waldheim's functions within the staff of the German Army's Group E from 1942 until 1945, as determined by the International Commission of Historians, were:

- Interpreter and liaison officer with the 5th Alpine Division (Italy) in Pljevlja, Montenegro from 22 March 1942 to July 1942;
- O2 (2nd Assistant Adjutant) to the 1b (General Staff Quartermaster) with Kampfgruppe West in Bosnia in June/August 1942,
- Interpreter with the liaison staff attached to the Italian 9th Army in Tirana in early summer 1942;
- O1 (1st Assistant Adjutant) to the 1a (General Staff Chief of Operations) in the German liaison staff with the Italian 11th Army and in the staff of the Army Group South in Greece in July/October 1943; and
- O3 (3rd Assistant Adjutant) to the 1c (General Staff Chief Intelligence Officer) officer on the staff of Army Group E in Arsakli, Kosovska Mitrovica and Sarajevo from October 1943 to January/February 1945.

By 1943, Waldheim was serving in the capacity of an aide-de-camp in Army Group E which was headed by General Alexander Löhr, who would be executed as a war criminal in 1947. In 1986, Waldheim said that he had served only as an interpreter and a clerk and had no knowledge either of reprisals against local Serb civilians or of massacres in neighboring provinces of Yugoslavia. He said that he had known some things and was horrified but felt powerless.

Much historical interest has centred on Waldheim's role in Operation Kozara in 1942. According to one post-war investigator, prisoners were routinely shot within only a few hundred metres (yards) of Waldheim's office, and 35 kilometres (22 mi) away at the Jasenovac concentration camp. Waldheim later stated that "he did not know about the murder of civilians there".

Waldheim's name appears on the Wehrmacht's "honour list" of those responsible for the militarily successful operation. The Nazi puppet state, the Independent State of Croatia, awarded Waldheim the Medal of the Crown of King Zvonimir in silver with an oak branches cluster. Decades later, during the lobbying for his election as U.N. Secretary General, Yugoslav President Josip Broz Tito, who had led the Yugoslav Partisans during the war, awarded Waldheim one of the highest Yugoslav orders, not knowing the details of his prior military service.

Waldheim denied that he knew war crimes were taking place in Bosnia at the height of the battles between the Nazis and Tito's partisans in 1943. According to Eli Rosenbaum, in 1944, Waldheim reviewed and approved a packet of antisemitic propaganda leaflets to be dropped behind Soviet lines, one of which ended: "Enough of the Jewish war, kill the Jews, come over."

In 1945, Waldheim surrendered to British forces in Carinthia, at which point he said he had fled his command post within Army Group E, where he was serving with General Alexander Löhr.

== Diplomatic career ==
After finishing his studies in law at the University of Vienna Waldheim joined the Austrian diplomatic service in 1945. Waldheim escaped denazification proceedings, as Austrian governmental forces quashed it, though it would have been required because of Waldheim's memberships in the SA's equestrian unit and in the NSDSB — Nazi Student Association. Thereafter, his diplomatic career could commence.

Waldheim served as First Secretary of the Legation in Paris from 1948, and in the Ministry for Foreign Affairs in Vienna from 1951 to 1956. In 1956 he was made Ambassador to Canada, returning to the Ministry in 1960, after which he became the Permanent Representative of Austria to the United Nations in 1964. For two years beginning in 1968, he was the Federal Minister for Foreign Affairs for the Austrian People's Party, before going back in 1970 as Permanent Representative to the UN. Shortly afterward he ran in the 1971 Austrian presidential election, and was defeated.

== United Nations Secretary-General ==
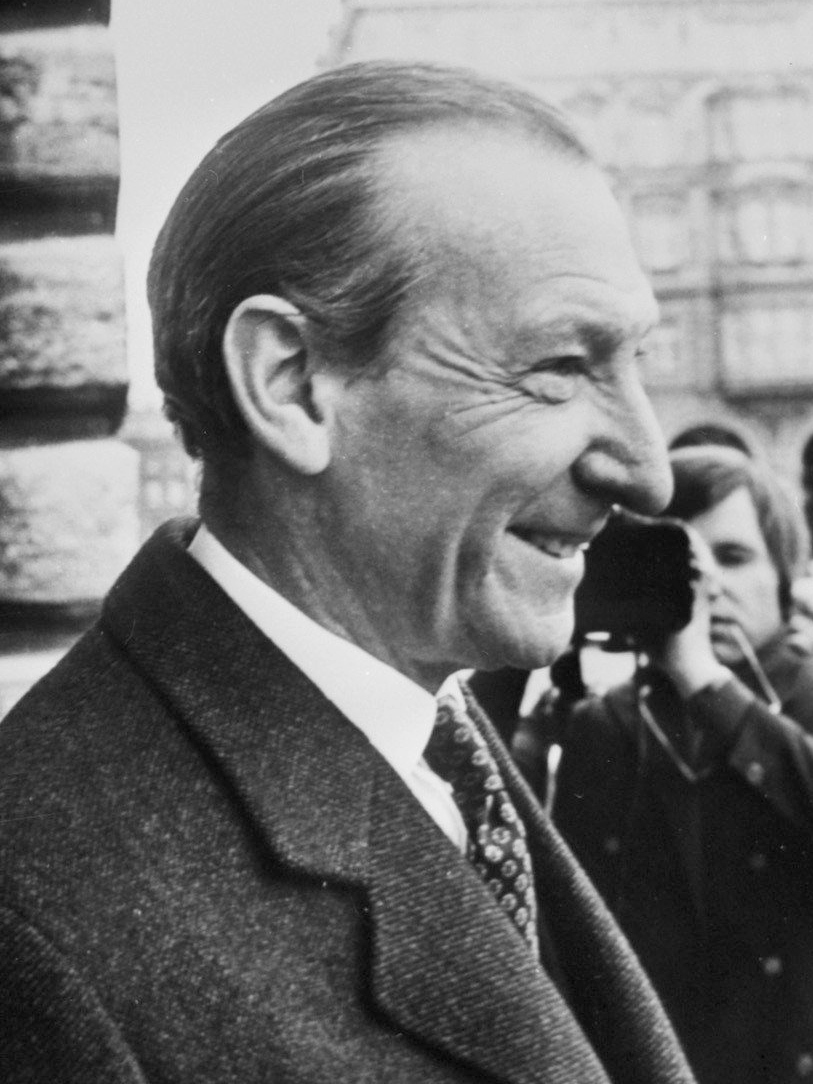
Waldheim c. 1971

After losing the presidential election, Waldheim ran for Secretary-General of the United Nations in the 1971 selection. Waldheim was supported by 11 votes, including the Soviet Union, and led the first two rounds of voting. The United States and United Kingdom initially supported him in the second round of voting. However, he was vetoed by China in the second round. Waldheim won an accidental victory in the third round of voting when those three permanent members failed to coordinate their vetoes and all abstained. According to Finnish diplomat Risto Hyvärinen, Waldheim's former Nazi connections were already known to the Finnish officials who supported Max Jakobson for Secretary-General in the election. However, this knowledge was not used against Waldheim, because the Finns believed he would not be chosen anyway due to China having promised to veto him.

As secretary-general from 1972 onward, Waldheim opened and addressed a number of major international conferences convened under United Nations auspices. These included the third session of the U.N. Conference on Trade and Development (Santiago, April 1972), the U.N. Conference on the Human Environment (Stockholm, June 1972), the third UN Conference on the Law of the Sea (Caracas, June 1974), the Third World Population Conference (Bucharest, August 1974) and the World Food Conference (Rome, November 1974), and the World Conference on Women, 1975 (Mexico City, June 1975). During the later, UN Resolution 3379, which considered Zionism as a form of racism and equated it with South African Apartheid, was approved by impulse of Arab countries, the Soviet bloc, and Non-Aligned Movement countries. His diplomatic efforts particularly in the Middle East were overshadowed by the diplomacy of then U.S. Secretary of State, Henry Kissinger.

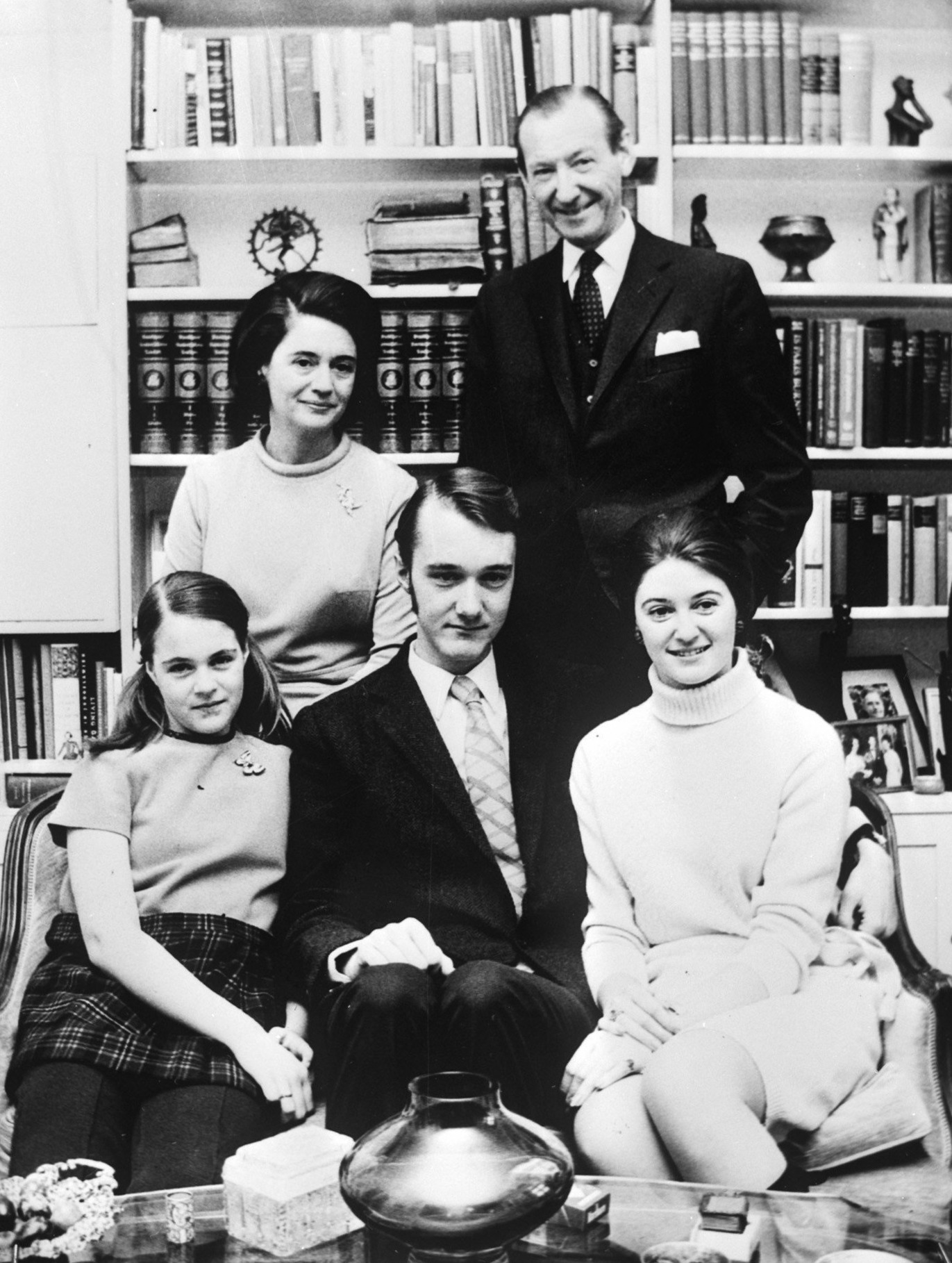
Waldheim with his family, c. 1971

On 11 September 1972, Ugandan dictator Idi Amin sent a telegram to Waldheim, copies of which went to Yasser Arafat and Golda Meir. In the telegram, Amin "applauded the massacre of the Israeli Olympic athletes in Munich and said Germany was the most appropriate locale for this because it was where Hitler burned more than six million Jews". Amin also called "to expel Israel from the United Nations and to send all the Israelis to Britain, which bore the guilt for creating the Jewish state". Amidst international protest, "the UN spokesman said [in his daily press conference] it was not the secretary-general's practice to comment on telegrams sent him by heads of government. He added that the secretary-general condemned any form of racial discrimination and genocide."

After Operation Entebbe on 7 July 1976 – in which Israeli commandos freed more than 100 Israeli and Jewish passengers held captive in Entebbe Airport (Uganda's main airport) by Popular Front for the Liberation of Palestine and German Revolutionary Cells fighters protected by forces of dictator Idi Amin, and where all the hijackers, three hostages, and 45 Ugandan soldiers were killed – Waldheim described the raid as a "serious violation of the national sovereignty of a United Nations member state".

Waldheim ran for a second term in the 1976 UN Secretary-General selection. However, China was still opposed to him, and approached several Third World countries seeking challengers. Outgoing Mexican President Luis Echeverría finally entered the race in October 1976, making Waldheim the only Secretary-General to face a contested re-selection campaign. Waldheim resoundingly defeated Echeverría in the first round of voting. China cast a single symbolic veto against Waldheim in the first round and voted for him in the second round, handing him an easy victory with 14 of 15 votes on the Security Council.

Waldheim's Voyager greeting.
Kurt Waldheim's Golden Record Greeting

In 1977, Waldheim recorded a greeting for the Voyager Golden Records, a pair of discs containing sounds and images representing the diversity of life and culture on Earth, which were launched into deep space on the Voyager spacecraft. The craft were also inscribed with a written message from then-U.S. President Jimmy Carter.

Waldheim was the first Secretary-General to visit North Korea, in 1979. In 1980, Waldheim flew to Iran in an attempt to negotiate the release of the American hostages held in Tehran, but Ayatollah Khomeini refused to see him. While in Tehran, it was announced that an attempt on Waldheim's life had been foiled. Near the end of his tenure as secretary-general, Waldheim and British popular musician Paul McCartney organized a series of concerts for the People of Kampuchea to help Cambodia recover from the damage done by Pol Pot.

Waldheim ran for an unprecedented third full term as Secretary-General in the 1981 selection. China was determined to unseat him this time and lined up a strong candidate in Salim Ahmed Salim of Tanzania. In the first round of voting, Waldheim lost to Salim by one vote. However, Salim was vetoed by the United States, while Waldheim was vetoed by China. The veto duel between China and the United States lasted a record 16 rounds. After six weeks of deadlock, Waldheim and Salim both withdrew from the race. Javier Pérez de Cuéllar of Peru won the selection and succeeded Waldheim as Secretary-General of the United Nations. The events of 1981 established a customary two-term limit on the office, and no Secretary-General since Waldheim has run for a third term.

== Presidency of Austria ==
=== Election and Waldheim Affair ===
Waldheim (2nd from left), with Italian Army Corps General Ercole Roncaglia (on his right), Wehrmacht Colonel Macholz (on his left) and SS General Artur Phleps (with briefcase) at Podgorica airfield in Montenegro during Operation Schwarz, 22 May 1943. This photograph caused much controversy when it was published while Waldheim was running in the 1986 Austrian presidential election.

Waldheim had unsuccessfully sought election as President of Austria in 1971, but his second attempt on 8 June 1986 proved successful. During his campaign for the presidency in 1985, what became known internationally as the "Waldheim affair" began. Before the presidential elections, investigative journalist Alfred Worm revealed in the Austrian weekly news magazine Profil that Waldheim's recently published autobiography had several omissions about his life between 1938 and 1945.

Waldheim had previously claimed to have received a medical discharge after being wounded in winter 1942. His aides at the United Nations even accused the Israeli mission of spreading rumors that he supported the Nazis. Israeli ambassador Yehuda Zvi Blum denied the charges, saying, "We don't believe Waldheim ever supported the Nazis and we never said he did. We have many differences with him, but that isn't one of them."

A short time later, beginning on 4 March 1986, the World Jewish Congress alleged that Waldheim had lied about his service in the mounted corps of the SA and had concealed his service as a special missions staff officer (Ordonnanzoffizier) for Germany's Army Group E in Yugoslavia and Greece, from 1942 to 1944, based primarily on captured German wartime records held at the United States National Archives in Washington, DC, and in other archives. The 23 March 1986 public disclosure by the World Jewish Congress that the organization had unearthed the fact that the United Nations War Crimes Commission concluded after the war that Waldheim was implicated in Nazi mass murder and should be arrested arguably transformed the Waldheim affair into the most sensational of all post-war Nazi scandals.

Waldheim called the allegations, which grew in magnitude in the ensuing months, "pure lies and malicious acts". Nevertheless, he admitted that he had known about German reprisals: "Yes, I knew. I was horrified. But what could I do? I had either to continue to serve or be executed." He said that he had never fired a shot or even seen a partisan. His former immediate superior at the time stated that Waldheim had "remained confined to a desk". Former Austrian chancellor Bruno Kreisky, who was Jewish, denounced the actions of the World Jewish Congress as an "extraordinary infamy", adding that Austrians would not "allow the Jews abroad to ... tell us who should be our President".

Part of the reason for the controversy was Austria's refusal to address its national role in the Holocaust (many leading Nazis, including Adolf Hitler, had been born Austrians, and Austria became part of the Third Reich). Austria refused to pay compensation to victims of Nazism, and from 1970 onwards refused to investigate Austrian citizens who were senior Nazis. Stolen Jewish art remained public property a generation after the Waldheim affair.

Because the revelations leading to the Waldheim affair came shortly before the presidential election, there has been speculation about the background of the affair. Declassified documents from the U.S. Central Intelligence Agency show that the CIA had been aware of some details of his wartime past since 1945. Information about Waldheim's wartime past was also previously published by a pro-German Austrian newspaper, Salzburger Volksblatt, during the 1971 presidential election campaign, including the claim of an SS membership, but the matter was supposedly regarded as unimportant or even advantageous for the candidate at that time.

In view of the ongoing international controversy, the Austrian government decided to appoint an international committee of historians to examine Waldheim's life between 1938 and 1945. Their report found no evidence of any personal involvement in those crimes. Although Waldheim had stated that he was unaware of any crimes taking place, the committee cited evidence that Waldheim must have known about war crimes. The International Committee in February 1988 concluded that Waldheim had been "in close proximity to some Nazi atrocities, knew they were going on and made no attempt to stop them". The committee also noted that "he only had very minor possibilities to act against the injustices happening".

=== Allegations of war crimes ===
On 27 April 1987, the United States Departments of Justice and of State announced that evidence amassed in an investigation conducted by the Justice Department's Office of Special Investigations (OSI) had established a prima facie case that Waldheim participated in Nazi-sponsored persecution during World War II and therefore that his entry into the United States was prohibited by federal statute. This marked the first time that a head of state had been put on an immigration watchlist. The 232-page internal Department of Justice 9 April 1987 investigative report was released in 1994 by that agency, and it is available at the agency's website. The report catalogues evidence that, the U.S. government concluded, proved that Waldheim had taken part in, among other actions: the transfer of civilian prisoners to the SS for exploitation as slave labor; the mass deportation of civilians—including Jews from Greek islands and the town of Banja Luka, Yugoslavia—to concentration and death camps; the utilization of antisemitic propaganda; the mistreatment and execution of Allied prisoners; and reprisal executions of hostages and other civilians.

Additional allegations of participation in Nazi crimes, with citations to captured Nazi documents and other records, were leveled in a 1993 book by Eli Rosenbaum, the former U.S. federal prosecutor who had directed the World Jewish Congress investigation that led to the New York Times' initial exposure of Waldheim's hidden Nazi-era past in 1986. The book also alleged that the Soviet Union was aware of Waldheim's alleged involvement in Nazi crimes and that, after vetoing other candidates in order to get Waldheim installed as U.N. Secretary General in 1972, used that information to extract concessions at the United Nations that facilitated KGB espionage in the United States, and that the CIA's failure to anticipate this possibility was a major failure for the intelligence agency. In a letter to the editor published in Foreign Affairs magazine two years after Rosenbaum's book was released, former Finnish ambassador to the U.N. Max Jakobson (one of the candidates whom the USSR had vetoed) wrote, "The Soviets knew everything about Waldheim. That is why they preferred him."

Throughout his term as President (1986–1992), Waldheim was officially deemed persona non grata by the United States and, officially or informally, by nearly every other nation in the world outside the Arab world.

Not all evidence was weighted against Waldheim. Royal Air Force Squadron Leader Bruce Ogilvie was captured in civilian clothing, carrying a stolen German pistol, on Leros, Greece, in 1943, and was taken to Athens along with other prisoners captured under circumstances that might have led to their executions had not Waldheim exchanged their identity tags for those of Allied soldiers killed in action.

== Later years and death ==
After his term ended in 1992, Waldheim did not seek re-election. In the same year, he was made an honorary member of K.H.V. Welfia Klosterneuburg, a Roman Catholic student fraternity, part of the Austrian Cartellverband. In 1994, Pope John Paul II awarded Waldheim a knighthood in the Order of Pius IX and his wife a papal honor. He died on 14 June 2007, at the age of 88 from heart failure. On 23 June, his funeral was held at St. Stephen's Cathedral, Vienna, and he was buried at the Presidential Vault in the Zentralfriedhof ("central cemetery"). He was survived by his wife, Elisabeth, his three children, and three grandchildren.

In his speech at the cathedral, Federal President Heinz Fischer called Waldheim "a great Austrian" who had been wrongfully accused of having committed war crimes. Fischer also praised Waldheim for his efforts to solve international crises and for his contributions to world peace. At Waldheim's own request, no foreign heads of states or governments were invited to attend his funeral except Hans-Adam II, the Prince of Liechtenstein. Also present was Luis Durnwalder, governor of the Italian province of South Tyrol. Japan and Syria were the only two countries that laid wreaths on his grave. Ban Ki-moon, the secretary-general of the United Nations, issued a message "voicing sadness". In a two-page letter, published posthumously by the Austrian Press Agency the day after he died, Waldheim admitted to making "mistakes" ("but these were certainly not those of a follower let alone an accomplice of a criminal regime") and asked his critics for forgiveness.

== Awards, decorations and honours ==
- Iron Cross (1939), 2nd Class
- General Assault Badge in Silver
- Wound Badge (1939) in Black
- Eastern Front Medal
- Medal of the Crown of King Zvonimir in Silver with Oak Leaves in 1942
- War Merit Cross (1939), 2nd and 1st Class with Swords
  - 2nd Class on 1 January 1944
  - 1st Class on 20 April 1945
- Grand Cross of the Order of Merit of the Federal Republic of Germany in 1969
- Grand Star of the Decoration of Honor for Services to the Republic of Austria in 1986
- Papal Order of Pius in 1994
  - this papal honor drew fierce international criticism at the time due to the Waldheim affair.
- Commander of the French Legion of Honor

=== Honours ===
- 1975: Honorary doctorate from the Katholieke Universiteit Leuven
  - awarded during his tenure as UN Secretary-General
- 1975: Honorary member of the Senior Council of the KVHV in Leuven
  - the Katholiek Vlaams Hoogstudentenverbond admitted him at that time
- 1979: Honorary doctorate (Dr. jur. h. c.) from Humboldt University of Berlin (East Berlin)
  - awarded within the context of the GDR's diplomatic relations with the United Nations
- 1980: Honorary degree from Keele University, later revoked following the Waldheim affair
- 1992: Honorary member of K.H.V. Welfia Klosterneuburg (ÖCV)
  - the long-established Austrian Catholic student fraternity admitted him after his presidency ended
- 2004: Julius Raab Medal of Honor in Gold
  - awarded by the ÖVP’s Business Federation when he was of advanced age

== Publications ==
- Waldheim, Kurt (1985). In the Eye of the Storm: The Memoirs of Kurt Waldheim. London: Weidenfeld and Nicolson. ISBN 0-297-78678-4.
- Waldheim, Kurt (1996) [1966]. Die Antwort (The Answer). Amalthea. ISBN 3-85002-371-0.
- Waldheim, Kurt (1971). The Austrian Example. Macmillan. ISBN 0-297-76522-1.
- Waldheim, Kurt (1980) [1977 (French)]. The Challenge of Peace. Weidenfeld & Nicolson. ISBN 0-297-77586-3.
- Waldheim, Kurt (1980). Building the Future Order. Free Press. ISBN 0-02-933670-8.

== See also ==
- UN Trade and Development III

== Bibliography ==
- Duncan, Evan M., ed. (2004), United Nations, 1969–1972, Foreign Relations of the United States, 1969–1976, vol. V, Washington: United States Government Printing Office
- Herzstein, Robert Edwin (1988). Waldheim: the missing years. New York: William Morrow. ISBN 0-87795-959-5. OCLC 17484125.

Diplomatic posts
Preceded by Franz Matsch	Ambassador of Austria to the United Nations; 1964–1968; 1970–1971	Succeeded by Heinrich Haymerle
Preceded by Heinrich Haymerle	Ambassador of Austria to the United Nations; 1964–1968; 1970–1971	Succeeded by Peter Jankowitsch
Preceded by U Thant	Secretary-General of the United Nations; 1972–1981	Succeeded by Javier Pérez de Cuéllar
Political offices
Preceded by Lujo Tončić-Sorinj	Minister of Foreign Affairs; 1968–1970	Succeeded by Rudolf Kirchschläger
Preceded by Rudolf Kirchschläger	President of Austria; 1986–1992	Succeeded by Thomas Klestil
