= United States presidential address to the United Nations General Assembly =

United States presidential addresses to the United Nations General Assembly are speeches delivered by the President of the United States to the United Nations General Assembly, principally during the annual general debate. By tradition, the U.S. president gives an annual address at the opening of the general debate every September. U.S. presidents have used the United Nations General Assembly as a platform to raise U.S. foreign policy priorities and global issues to heads of state and national leaders in attendance.

== History ==
Harry S. Truman was the first U.S. president to address the United Nations, speaking via direct wire to the United Nations Conference on International Organization in San Francisco, California, on April 25, 1945.

The President of the United States has addressed the United Nations General Assembly every year since 1982.

== Speaking order and protocol ==
In contemporary practice, Brazil traditionally is the first country delegation to speak first at the opening of the general debate. In the early days of the United Nations, Brazil stepped up to speak first when other countries were reluctant to do so. As the host country, the United States traditionally follows Brazil as the second speaker. The President of the United Nations General Assembly, as the chair of the general debate, formally recognizes the U.S. president and invites them to the podium at the front of the General Assembly Hall.

While the general debate has a 15-minute voluntary limit on statements, U.S. presidents have commonly spoken longer than 15 minutes.

== List of addresses ==
Date	President	Details	Image
April 25, 1945	Harry S. Truman	Addressed the United Nations Conference on International Organization via direct wire/radio. Truman stressed that "if we do not want to die together in war, we must learn to live together in peace".	
October 24, 1950	Harry S. Truman	Addressed the United Nations General Assembly on the fifth anniversary of the United Nations Charter. Truman called the United Nations our "greatest advance" toward world peace. Truman stressed that nations must stop armed aggression together, pointing to the ongoing conflict in Korea as a vital test for the UN's power to keep order.	
June 20, 1955	Dwight D. Eisenhower	Addressed the Tenth Anniversary Meeting of the United Nations. Eisenhower delivered a special message from the U.S. Congress reaffirming America's deep desire for global peace. Eisenhower noted that while the UN faced setbacks and failures over its first decade, it had achieved vital victories that prevented major human disasters. Eisenhower looked forward to the upcoming July 1955 Big Four Conference with Britain, France, and the Soviet Union, expressing hope for easing Cold War tensions.	
September 22, 1960	Dwight D. Eisenhower	Addressed the fifteenth session of the United Nations General Assembly. Eisenhower welcomed newly independent African states and proposed a five-point program to protect them from Cold War interference, support regional security, and provide emergency aid during the Congo Crisis. He focused heavily on global hunger and malnutrition, urging the UN to spearhead a cooperative international food program using surplus agricultural production (expanding on the U.S. Food for Peace concept). He reaffirmed U.S. commitment to verified, reciprocal international arms inspection and disarmament, while cautioning against wasteful regional arms races. He proposed dedicating outer space exclusively to peaceful, scientific use and barring weapons of mass destruction from orbit.	
September 25, 1961	John F. Kennedy	Kennedy opened the address by mourning the recent death of UN secretary-general Dag Hammarskjöld in a plane crash, stressing that the organization must survive and grow to preserve global peace. He challenged the Soviet Union to a "peace race", calling for total and general disarmament rather than an arms race. Kennedy also warned "Mankind must put an end to war or war will put an end to mankind."	
September 20, 1963	John F. Kennedy	Addressed the eighteenth session of the United Nations General Assembly. Kennedy celebrated the recent signing of the Partial Nuclear Test Ban Treaty, calling it a shift from fear to hope. He also proposed a joint U.S.-Soviet expedition to the moon.	
December 17, 1963	Lyndon B. Johnson	In the wake of the assassination of John F. Kennedy, Johnson reassured the United Nations that "the assassin's bullet which took his life did not alter his Nation's purpose". Johnson called for slowing the global arms race and preventing the spread of nuclear weapons. He also pledged continued U.S. cooperation to fight worldwide poverty, hunger, disease, and illiteracy.	
October 23, 1964	Lyndon B. Johnson	Delivered recorded remarks on the nineteenth anniversary of the United Nations Charter. Johnson compared the strength of the UN in 1964 to the fragile hopes for peace during the Munich crisis in 1938, 19 years after the League of Nations was founded. Johnson praised UN agencies for fighting humanity's common enemies across national borders, including hunger, sickness, and ignorance. He candidly noted that the organization was facing a real crisis regarding members paying their fair share of operational costs, but emphasized that the United States would not tremble before temporary threats.	
September 18, 1969	Richard Nixon	Addressed the twenty-fourth session of the United Nations General Assembly. President Nixon urged member nations to help end the Vietnam War by using their influence on North Vietnam to negotiate a peaceful settlement.	
October 23, 1970	Richard Nixon	Addressed the Twenty-Fifth Anniversary Session of the United Nations General Assembly. Nixon honored the founders of the UN, addressed global peace, and cautioned against overly optimistic or extravagant expectations while stressing the practical, ongoing necessity of international cooperation.	
September 18, 1974	Gerald Ford	Addressed the twenty-ninth session of the United Nations General Assembly. Ford called for an international cooperative approach to handle skyrocketing oil prices and worsening global food shortages.	
March 17, 1977	Jimmy Carter	In his first major foreign policy address as president, Carter stated that human rights were the "backbone" of U.S. foreign policy. He rejected the idea that a nation's treatment of its citizens is strictly an internal matter, reminding member states of their pledges under the UN Charter. Carter also called for a reduction in global nuclear armaments and efforts to halt the proliferation of nuclear weapons.	
October 4, 1977	Jimmy Carter	Addressed the thirty-second session of the United Nations General Assembly. Carter focused heavily on global peace, arms control, nuclear non-proliferation, and the peaceful resolution of regional conflicts. He proposed reciprocal cuts in nuclear arsenals and discussed human rights.	
June 17, 1982	Ronald Reagan	Addressed a special United Nations General Assembly session devoted to disarmament. Reagan stressed that true peace requires concrete deeds rather than empty rhetoric, warning against manipulating public fear.	
September 26, 1983	Ronald Reagan	Addressed the thirty-eighth session of the United Nations General Assembly. Reagan declared "a nuclear war cannot be won, and it must never be fought". He urged the Soviet Union to engage in serious, flexible, and genuine negotiations rather than relying on rhetoric, noting concerns over compliance with prior agreements. Reagan also called for a return to the UN's founding principles of non-alignment and universality, warning against polarization and bloc politics that hindered the organization's mission.	
September 24, 1984	Ronald Reagan	Addressed the thirty-ninth session of the United Nations General Assembly. He framed world peace and human dignity as the two fundamental, guiding goals of the United Nations. Quoting Thomas Paine, Reagan said "We have it in our power to begin the world over again", urging nations to approach one another with trust and affection.	
October 24, 1985	Ronald Reagan	Addressed the fortieth session of the United Nations General Assembly. Reagan previewed the upcoming Geneva Summit with General Secretary Mikhail Gorbachev. He also introduced a peace initiative targeting regional conflicts in Africa, Asia, and Central America.	
September 22, 1986	Ronald Reagan	Addressed the forty-first session of the United Nations General Assembly. Reagan addressed the organization's severe fiscal problems, urging member states to adopt administrative reforms to restore the body's financial health and global credibility. Reagan also discussed ongoing diplomatic talks with General Secretary Mikhail Gorbachev, emphasizing that mutual trust requires openness and a halt to efforts by the Soviet Union to impose its ideology on other nations through force.	
September 21, 1987	Ronald Reagan	Addressed the forty-second session of the United Nations General Assembly.	
September 26, 1988	Ronald Reagan	Addressed the forty-third session of the United Nations General Assembly. Reagan noted a positive shift in world affairs, pointing to decreasing tensions and a reduction in armed conflicts in regions like the Persian Gulf, Afghanistan, southern Africa, and Cambodia. He highlighted the Intermediate-Range Nuclear Forces Treaty and praised a thawing in East-West relations, expressing hope for continued democratic and economic reforms. Reagan emphasized that true peace relies on upholding individual human rights and noted "my country has always believed that where the rights of the individual and the people are enshrined, war is a distant prospect. For it is not people who make war; only governments do that."	
September 25, 1989	George H. W. Bush	Addressed the forty-fourth session of the United Nations General Assembly. President Bush proposed a major new international treaty to completely eliminate chemical weapons globally. He pledged that the United States would destroy 98% of its chemical weapons stockpile within the first eight years of a ban coming into effect, and 100% within ten years, provided that all other major chemical weapons-capable nations signed the agreement.	
October 1, 1990	George H. W. Bush	Addressed the forty-fifth session of the United Nations General Assembly. President Bush focused heavily on Iraq's invasion of Kuwait, condemning Iraqi aggression and calling for total international compliance with UN economic sanctions and resolutions. He highlighted a new era of global unity between the United States and the Soviet Union, stressing that the end of Cold War divisions allowed the UN to finally function as intended.	
September 23, 1991	George H. W. Bush	Addressed the forty-sixth session of the United Nations General Assembly. Bush welcomed new member states including South Korea, North Korea, Estonia, Latvia, and Lithuania, noting that UN membership had grown to 166 nations. He reiterated accountability for Iraq regarding compliance with UN resolutions following the Gulf War. Bush also called for the repeal of UN Resolution 3379, which equated Zionism with racism.	
September 21, 1992	George H. W. Bush	Addressed the forty-seventh session of the United Nations General Assembly. Bush emphasized that the collapse of communism left an opening for the UN to fulfill its founding mission of keeping world peace.	
September 27, 1993	Bill Clinton	Addressed the forty-eighth session of the United Nations General Assembly. Clinton introduced the policy of "enlargement" to expand democracy and free markets globally. He also addressed the need to reform UN peacekeeping operations.	
September 26, 1994	Bill Clinton	Addressed the forty-ninth session of the United Nations General Assembly. Clinton said "we face a contest as old as history, a struggle between freedom and tyranny, between tolerance and bigotry, between knowledge and ignorance, between openness and isolation".	
October 22, 1995	Bill Clinton	Addressed the fiftieth-anniversary commemorative session of the United Nations General Assembly.	
September 24, 1996	Bill Clinton	Addressed the fifty-first session of the United Nations General Assembly. President Clinton celebrated the signing of the Comprehensive Nuclear-Test-Ban Treaty (CTBT), emphasizing that the collective signatures of major nuclear powers created an immediate international norm against nuclear testing.	
September 22, 1997	Bill Clinton	Addressed the fifty-second session of the United Nations General Assembly. Clinton challenged the UN and world leaders to build new international frameworks and institutions to ensure globalization benefits all nations and people. He also praised Secretary-General Kofi Annan's aggressive reform agenda to make the organization more streamlined, efficient, and focused rather than just smaller. Clinton also announced that he was submitting the Comprehensive Nuclear-Test-Ban Treaty (CTBT) to the U.S. Senate for ratification, urging a permanent halt to nuclear weapons testing globally.	
September 21, 1998	Bill Clinton	Addressed the fifty-third session of the United Nations General Assembly. Clinton highlighted post-Cold War achievements, including peace in Northern Ireland, democratic elections in Bosnia, and the fiftieth anniversary of the Universal Declaration of Human Rights. He framed terrorism as a global peril—not just an American issue—referencing recent attacks globally and calling for strict international cooperation, shared extradition rules, and the denial of sanctuary to terrorist groups.	
September 21, 1999	Bill Clinton	Addressed the fifty-fourth session of the United Nations General Assembly. Clinton praised UN peace efforts in Kosovo and East Timor, urging the international community to strengthen its capacity to stop ethnic cleansing and mass atrocities, while noting practical limits ("We cannot do everything everywhere").	
September 6, 2000	Bill Clinton	Addressed the United Nations Millennium Summit. Clinton called on global leaders to "rewrite human history in the new millennium". Clinton emphasized that the global community faced fewer wars between nations but a sharp rise in brutal wars within nations driven by ethnic and religious differences. He argued that the UN must find ways to protect not only sovereign borders but also the vulnerable people living inside them.	
November 10, 2001	George W. Bush	Addressed the fifty-sixth session of the United Nations General Assembly in the wake of the September 11, 2001 attacks. President Bush called on every member nation to actively participate in the War on Terror. He urged countries to share intelligence, crack down on terrorist financing, coordinate law enforcement, and enforce UN Security Council Resolution 1373.	
September 12, 2002	George W. Bush	Addressed the fifty-seventh session of the United Nations General Assembly. Bush's address centered on challenging the international community to confront the "grave and gathering danger" posed by Iraq. Bush detailed a decade of defiance by the Iraqi regime, citing violations of UN Security Council resolutions regarding weapons of mass destruction, long-range missiles, support for terrorism, and the mistreatment of civilian populations and Kuwaiti prisoners. He urged the Security Council to enforce its own resolutions, warning that the organization would risk irrelevance if it failed to act, and stated that the United States would take necessary actions if Iraq refused to disarm completely and comply unconditionally.	
September 23, 2003	George W. Bush	Addressed the fifty-eighth session of the United Nations General Assembly. Bush defended the U.S.-led coalition's invasion of Iraq, stating that removing Saddam Hussein made the world safer. He urged the international community to put aside past disagreements and help rebuild Iraq into a stable democracy, noting that "Iraq as a dictatorship had great power to destabilize the Middle East; Iraq as a democracy will have great power to inspire the Middle East."	
September 21, 2004	George W. Bush	Addressed the fifty-ninth session of the United Nations General Assembly. Bush focused on expanding liberty globally as an alternative to terror and violence, stating that establishing democracy was vital for lasting peace. He also honored aid workers and peacekeepers, specifically mentioning the late UN envoy Sérgio Vieira de Mello, who was killed in the August 2003 canal hotel bombing in Baghdad.	
September 14, 2005	George W. Bush	Addressed the sixtieth session of the United Nations General Assembly. President Bush began by thanking the international community for contributions to recovery efforts following Hurricane Katrina. Bush also called on the international community to help developing nations through free trade.	
September 19, 2006	George W. Bush	Addressed the sixty-first session of the United Nations General Assembly. Bush directly addressed Muslims to state that the United States is not at war with Islam, calling claims about a "war against Islam" false propaganda. He urged world leaders to support moderates and reformers in places like Iraq, Lebanon, Afghanistan, and the broader Middle East rather than yielding to extremists. Bush also called on the United Nations to quickly deploy a robust peacekeeping force to the Darfur region of Sudan to protect civilians.	
September 25, 2007	George W. Bush	Addressed the sixty-second session of the United Nations General Assembly. Bush marked the upcoming anniversary of the Universal Declaration of Human Rights, stating that its standards must guide global action. Bush also urged tighter economic sanctions and expanded visa bans against the Burmese military regime and human rights abusers.	
September 23, 2008	George W. Bush	Addressed the general debate of the sixty-third session of the United Nations General Assembly. Bush warned that the greatest challenge to international ideals was a global movement of violent extremists who deliberately target the innocent. He urged the international community to move beyond passing resolutions after attacks occur and instead cooperate proactively to prevent terrorism.	
September 23, 2009	Barack Obama	Addressed the general debate of the sixty-fourth session of the United Nations General Assembly. Obama called for a "new chapter of international cooperation." Obama stated that the era of a unilateral U.S. approach was over, but emphasized that other nations must also step up and share the burden of solving global problems rather than expecting America to act alone. He noted that in the 21st century, the security and prosperity of all nations are deeply intertwined, urging the global community to move past old divisions.	
September 23, 2010	Barack Obama	Addressed the general debate of the sixty-fifth session of the United Nations General Assembly. Obama urged Israeli Prime Minister Benjamin Netanyahu and Palestinian President Mahmoud Abbas to push forward with direct peace talks and follow their words of coexistence with concrete action. He emphasized that the goal of two states living side-by-side in peace and security must be realized. He highlighted that international coordination through the G20 had pulled the world back from the brink of a severe economic depression, though he noted more work remained to achieve broad prosperity. Obama also addressed the ongoing drawdown of U.S. troops in Iraq, the shift in focus toward defeating al-Qaeda, and noted that efforts to delegitimize Israel would face the firm opposition of the United States.	
September 21, 2011	Barack Obama	Addressed the general debate of the sixty-sixth session of the United Nations General Assembly. Obama praised the democratic movements of the Arab Spring and peaceful transitions in countries like Tunisia, Egypt, and Libya, while urging the international community to stand united against oppression in places like Syria, Iran, and Yemen. Obama also highlighted the ongoing withdrawal of U.S. troops from Iraq and the transition of security responsibilities in Afghanistan. He also noted the killing of Osama bin Laden earlier that year as a major milestone against al-Qaeda.	
September 25, 2012	Barack Obama	Addressed the general debate of the sixty-seventh session of the United Nations General Assembly. Obama opened the speech by honoring U.S. Ambassador J. Christopher Stevens, who had been killed earlier that month in an attack in Benghazi, Libya. He noted that Stevens embodied the best of America and international cooperation. Following violent protests across the Middle East sparked by an anti-Muslim video, Obama strongly defended freedom of expression. He explained that the U.S. government could not and would not ban the offensive video because free speech is protected by the U.S. Constitution. He also asserted that no offensive speech or video justifies violence or attacks on embassies. He vowed that the United States would bring those responsible for the attacks to justice.	
September 24, 2013	Barack Obama	Addressed the general debate of the sixty-eighth session of the United Nations General Assembly. Obama's speech focused heavily on American policy in the Middle East, specifically addressing the civil war in Syria, Iran's nuclear program, and the Israeli-Palestinian conflict. He noted openness to diplomatic engagement with Iran's new government under Hassan Rouhani while insisting that Tehran must take concrete steps to prove its nuclear program is exclusively peaceful.	
September 24, 2014	Barack Obama	Addressed the general debate of the sixty-ninth session of the United Nations General Assembly. Obama called for global unity to reject the "cancer of violent extremism", specifically targeting the Islamic State of Iraq and the Levant (ISIL) and urging a collective effort to dismantle extremist networks and cut off their funding. He criticized Russia's actions in Ukraine and annexation of Crimea, stating that "bigger nations should not bully smaller ones". He addressed pressing international emergencies including the Ebola outbreak in West Africa, urging stronger global public health cooperation.	
September 28, 2015	Barack Obama	Addressed the general debate of the seventieth session of the United Nations General Assembly. Obama highlighted the Iran nuclear deal and the re-establishment of diplomatic relations with Cuba. Obama also called for a managed political transition away from Syrian President Bashar al-Assad.	
September 20, 2016	Barack Obama	Addressed the general debate of the seventy-first session of the United Nations General Assembly. Obama reviewed major achievements and ongoing challenges of his presidency, including the Paris Climate Agreement, the Iran nuclear deal, and the crisis in Syria. He advocated for open societies, human rights, and international institutions while acknowledging economic inequalities that fuel backlash against globalization.	
September 19, 2017	Donald Trump	Addressed the general debate of the seventy-second session of the United Nations General Assembly. Trump stated that he will always put American interests and people first, emphasizing that nations must protect their own borders and laws rather than submit to globalism. Trump also warned that the United States would "totally destroy" North Korea if it threatened America or its allies, calling Kim Jong Un "Rocket Man". He also called the 2015 Iran nuclear deal an "embarrassment" to the United States.	
September 25, 2018	Donald Trump	Addressed the general debate of the seventy-third session of the United Nations General Assembly. Trump told world leaders that "America is governed by Americans" and asked every nation to protect its own borders and independence.	
September 25, 2019	Donald Trump	Addressed the general debate of the seventy-fourth session of the United Nations General Assembly. Trump declared that "the future does not belong to globalists; it belongs to patriots."	
September 22, 2020	Donald Trump	Delivered a pre-recorded address to the general debate of the seventy-fifth session of the United Nations General Assembly. Trump heavily criticized China, demanding that the UN hold China accountable for unleashing COVID-19. He defended his administration's handling of COVID-19, pointing to domestic mobilizations, surplus ventilator production, and upcoming vaccine developments. Trump also touted his administration's brokering of the Abraham Accords between Israel, the United Arab Emirates, and Bahrain, declaring a "dawn of the new Middle East".	
September 21, 2021	Joe Biden	Addressed the general debate of the seventy-sixth session of the United Nations General Assembly. Biden highlighted the end of twenty years of U.S. involvement in Afghanistan, urged nations to accelerate COVID-19 vaccination efforts, and pledged increased climate support for developing nations.	
September 21, 2022	Joe Biden	Addressed the general debate of the seventy-seventh session of the United Nations General Assembly. Biden strongly rebuked Russian president Vladimir Putin for his invasion of Ukraine, calling it a shameless violation of the UN Charter. He also criticized planned sham annexation votes in occupied regions of Ukraine. He also emphasized that the United States does not seek conflict or a "Cold War" with China, while reaffirming the U.S. commitment to the One China policy.	
September 19, 2023	Joe Biden	Addressed the general debate of the seventy-eighth session of the United Nations General Assembly. Biden strongly condemned Russia's invasion of Ukraine, urging world leaders to continue standing with Ukraine to defend its sovereignty and territorial integrity. He also advocated for modernizing and expanding international bodies like the UN Security Council and the World Bank to make them more inclusive and effective for developing nations. Biden also mentioned the critical need to address climate change and establish global norms for artificial intelligence to ensure it serves as a tool of opportunity rather than oppression.	
September 24, 2024	Joe Biden	Addressed the general debate of the seventy-ninth session of the United Nations General Assembly. Reflecting on his more than 50 years in public service, Biden compared the current era of global tension to past turning points like the Cold War and the Vietnam War. He urged global leaders that "our task, our test, is to make sure that the forces holding us together are stronger than those that are pulling us apart". Emphasizing the importance of democratic values, Biden also noted that "some things are more important than staying in power", explaining his choice to step aside from his reelection campaign.	
September 23, 2025	Donald Trump	Main article: 2025 Donald Trump speech at the United Nations Addressed the general debate of the eightieth session of the United Nations General Assembly. President Trump condemned illegal immigration and called climate change a "con job". He criticized his European allies for investing in renewable energy and opening their borders to "a force of illegal aliens like nobody has ever seen before", claiming "Both the immigration and suicidal energy ideas will be the death of Western Europe." He also criticized Russia for its conduct in the Russo-Ukrainian War, dismissing Russia as a "paper tiger" and not a "real military power" while threatening additional tariffs on the country. He mentioned a brief conversation with Brazilian president Luiz Inácio Lula da Silva moments before, announcing plans to meet with him next week after stating that they had an "excellent chemistry" and "embraced each other".	
September 22, 2026	Donald Trump	Addressed the general debate of the eighty-first session of the United Nations General Assembly. Trump defended U.S. military action against Iran and reiterated his opposition to an Iranian nuclear weapon, warning of further military action if a peace agreement was not reached. He expressed confidence that the Russo-Ukrainian War could be resolved diplomatically and defended U.S. military action against drug cartels while asserting a more active U.S. role in the Western Hemisphere. Trump also criticized the International Criminal Court, promoted reductions to the UN's budget and bureaucracy, and rejected international regulation of artificial intelligence, which he proposed referring to as "super intelligence."	

== Participation in other bodies of the United Nations ==
The President of the United States may occasionally attend or address other high-level UN bodies or sessions outside of the General Assembly. For example, President Barack Obama chaired a session of the United Nations Security Council on foreign terrorist fighters on September 24, 2014. President Donald Trump also chaired a Security Council session on non-proliferation on September 26, 2018.

== See also ==
- United States and the United Nations
- List of UN General Assembly sessions
- List of General debates of the United Nations General Assembly
- United States Oval Office Address
- State of the Union
- List of international trips made by presidents of the United States
