= President of the United Nations General Assembly =

Chair and presiding officer of the body

- Emblem of the United Nations

- Flag of the United Nations

- Incumbent; Khalilur Rahman since 8 September 2026
- United Nations General Assembly
- Style: His Excellency
- Status: Presiding officer
- Member of: General Assembly
- Residence: New York City (International Territory)
- Seat: United Nations Headquarters
- Appointer: Member states of General Assembly
- Term length: One year
- Constituting instrument: Charter of the United Nations
- Inaugural holder: Paul-Henri Spaak
- Formation: 1946
- Website: un.org/en/ga/

The president of the United Nations General Assembly is a position voted by representatives in the United Nations General Assembly (UNGA) on a yearly basis. The president is the chair and presiding officer of the General Assembly.

== Election ==
A map of the world showing the home countries of presidents of the United Nations General Assembly up until the 76th session of the General Assembly in 2021–22, with historical member states in inset.

The session of the assembly is scheduled for every year starting in September—any special, or emergency special, assemblies over the next year will be headed by the president of the UNGA.

The presidency rotates annually between the five geographic groups: African, Asia-Pacific, Eastern European, Latin American and Caribbean, and Western European and other States.

Because of their powerful stature globally, some of the largest, most powerful countries have never held the presidency, including the five permanent members of the United Nations Security Council and Japan.

A few countries had a national elected as president of UNGA twice: Argentina, Chile, Ecuador, Germany, Hungary, Nigeria, and Bangladesh. In addition to the president, a slate of 21 vice-presidents are elected for each General Assembly session. The vice-presidents have the same powers and duties as the president, and the president may designate one of them to cover his or her absence from any meeting or part thereof.

== List of presidents ==
Year elected	Image	Name of president (Birth–Death)	UN member state	Region	Sessions
1946		Paul-Henri Spaak (1889–1972)	Belgium	WES	First
1947		Oswaldo Aranha (1894–1960)	Brazil	LAS	First special Second
1948		José Arce (1881–1968)	Argentina	LAS	Second special
1948		Herbert Vere Evatt (1894–1965)	Australia	COS	Third
1949		Carlos P. Romulo (1898–1985)	Philippines	EAS	Fourth, First Asian president
1950		Nasrollah Entezam (1900–1980)	Iran	EAS	Fifth
1951		Luis Padilla Nervo (1894–1985)	Mexico	LAS	Sixth
1952		Lester B. Pearson (1897–1972)	Canada	COS	Seventh
1953		Vijaya Lakshmi Pandit (1900–1990)	India	COS	Eighth, First woman president
1954		Eelco van Kleffens (1894–1983)	Netherlands	WES	Ninth
1955		José Maza Fernández (1889–1964)	Chile	LAS	Tenth
1956		Rudecindo Ortega Mason (1896–1962)	Chile	LAS	First emergency special Second emergency special
1956		Wan Waithayakon (1891–1976)	Thailand	EAS	Eleventh
1957		Leslie Munro (1901–1974)	New Zealand	COS	Twelfth; Third emergency special
1958		Charles Malik (1906–1987)	Lebanon	MES	Thirteenth
1959		Víctor Andrés Belaúnde (1893–1966)	Peru	LAS	Fourteenth; Fourth emergency special
1960		Frederick Boland (1904–1985)	Ireland	WES	Fifteenth; Third special
1961		Mongi Slim (1908–1969)	Tunisia	MES	Sixteenth, First African president
1962		Muhammad Zafarullah Khan (1893–1985)	Pakistan	COS	Seventeenth; Fourth special
1963		Carlos Sosa Rodríguez (1912–1997)	Venezuela	LAS	Eighteenth
1964		Alex Quaison-Sackey (1924–1992)	Ghana	COS	Nineteenth
1965		Amintore Fanfani (1908–1999)	Italy	WES	Twentieth
1966		Abdul Rahman Pazhwak (1919–1995)	Afghanistan	Asia	Twenty-first; Fifth special Fifth emergency special
1967		Corneliu Mănescu (1916–2000)	Romania	EEG	Twenty-second
1968		Emilio Arenales Catalán (1922–1969)	Guatemala	GRULAC	Twenty-third
1969		Angie Brooks (1928–2007)	Liberia	Africa	Twenty-fourth
1970		Edvard Hambro (1911–1977)	Norway	WEOG	Twenty-fifth
1971		Adam Malik (1917–1984)	Indonesia	Asia	Twenty-sixth
1972		Stanisław Trepczyński (1924–2002)	Poland	EEG	Twenty-seventh
1973		Leopoldo Benites (1905–1996)	Ecuador	GRULAC	Twenty-eighth; Sixth special
1974		Abdelaziz Bouteflika (1937–2021)	Algeria	Africa	Twenty-ninth; Seventh special
1975		Gaston Thorn (1928–2007)	Luxembourg	WEOG	Thirtieth
1976		Hamilton Shirley Amerasinghe (1913–1980)	Sri Lanka	Asia	Thirty-first
1977		Lazar Mojsov (1920–2011)	Yugoslavia	EEG	Thirty-second; Eighth special Ninth special Tenth special
1978		Indalecio Liévano (1917–1982)	Colombia	GRULAC	Thirty-third
1979		Salim Ahmed Salim (born 1942)	United Republic of Tanzania	Africa	Thirty-fourth; Sixth emergency special Seventh emergency special Eleventh special
1980		Rüdiger von Wechmar (1923–2007)	Federal Republic of Germany	WEOG	Thirty-fifth; Eighth emergency special
1981		Ismat T. Kittani (1929–2001)	Iraq	Asia	Thirty-sixth; Seventh emergency special—Continuation; Ninth emergency special Twelfth special
1982		Imre Hollai (1925–2017)	Hungary	EEG	Thirty-seventh
1983		Jorge Illueca (1918–2012)	Panama	GRULAC	Thirty-eighth
1984		Paul J. F. Lusaka (1935–1996)	Zambia	Africa	Thirty-ninth
1985		Jaime de Piniés (1917–2003)	Spain	WEOG	Fortieth; Thirteenth special
1986		Humayun Rashid Choudhury (1928–2001)	Bangladesh	Asia	Forty-first; Fourteenth special
1987		Peter Florin (1921–2014)	German Democratic Republic	EEG	Forty-second; Fifteenth special
1988		Dante Caputo (1943–2018)	Argentina	GRULAC	Forty-third
1989		Joseph Nanven Garba (1943–2002)	Nigeria	Africa	Forty-fourth; Sixteenth special Seventeenth special Eighteenth special
1990		Guido de Marco (1931–2010)	Malta	WEOG	Forty-fifth
1991		Samir Shihabi (1925–2010)	Saudi Arabia	Asia	Forty-sixth
1992		Stoyan Ganev (1955–2013)	Bulgaria	EEG	Forty-seventh
1993		Rudy Insanally (1936–2023)	Guyana	GRULAC	Forty-eighth
1994		Amara Essy (1944–2025)	Ivory Coast	Africa	Forty-ninth
1995		Diogo Freitas do Amaral (1941–2019)	Portugal	WEOG	Fiftieth
1996		Razali Ismail (born 1939)	Malaysia	Asia	Fifty-first; Tenth emergency special Nineteenth special
1997		Hennadiy Udovenko (1931–2013)	Ukraine	EEG	Fifty-second; Tenth emergency special—Continuation; Twentieth special
1998		Didier Opertti (born 1937)	Uruguay	GRULAC	Fifty-third; Tenth emergency special—Continuation; Twenty-first special
1999		Theo-Ben Gurirab (1938–2018)	Namibia	Africa	Fifty-fourth; Twenty-second special Twenty-third special Twenty-fourth special
2000		Harri Holkeri (1937–2011)	Finland	WEOG	Fifty-fifth; Tenth emergency special—Continuation; Twenty-fifth special Twenty-sixth special
2001		Han Seung-soo (born 1936)	South Korea	Asia	Fifty-sixth; Tenth emergency special—Continuation; Twenty-seventh special
2002		Jan Kavan (born 1946)	Czech Republic	EEG	Fifty-seventh; Tenth emergency special—Continuation
2003		Julian Hunte (born 1940)	Saint Lucia	GRULAC	Fifty-eighth; Tenth emergency special—Continuation
2004		Jean Ping (born 1942)	Gabon	Africa	Fifty-ninth; Twenty-eighth special
2005		Jan Eliasson (born 1940)	Sweden	WEOG	Sixtieth
2006		Haya Rashed Al-Khalifa (born 1952)	Bahrain	Asia	Sixty-first; Tenth emergency special—Continuation
2007		Srgjan Kerim (born 1948)	FYR Macedonia	EEG	Sixty-second
2008		Miguel d'Escoto Brockmann (1933–2017)	Nicaragua	GRULAC	Sixty-third
2009		Ali Treki (1937–2015)	Libya	Africa	Sixty-fourth
2010		Joseph Deiss (born 1946)	Switzerland	WEOG	Sixty-fifth
2011		Nassir Al-Nasser (born 1952)	Qatar	Asia-Pacific	Sixty-sixth
2012		Vuk Jeremić (born 1975)	Serbia	EEG	Sixty-seventh (election)
2013		John William Ashe (1954–2016)	Antigua and Barbuda	GRULAC	Sixty-eighth
2014		Sam Kutesa (born 1949)	Uganda	Africa	Sixty-ninth; Twenty-ninth special
2015		Mogens Lykketoft (born 1946)	Denmark	WEOG	Seventieth; Thirtieth special
2016		Peter Thomson (born 1948)	Fiji	Asia-Pacific	Seventy-first (election)
2017		Miroslav Lajčák (born 1963)	Slovakia	EEG	Seventy-second; Tenth emergency special—Continuation
2018		María Fernanda Espinosa (born 1964)	Ecuador	GRULAC	Seventy-third
2019		Tijjani Muhammad-Bande (born 1957)	Nigeria	Africa	Seventy-fourth
2020		Volkan Bozkır (born 1950)	Turkey	WEOG	Seventy-fifth
2021		Abdulla Shahid (born 1962)	Maldives	Asia-Pacific	Seventy-sixth; Eleventh emergency special
2022		Csaba Kőrösi (born 1958)	Hungary	EEG	Seventy-seventh
2023		Dennis Francis (born 1956)	Trinidad and Tobago	GRULAC	Seventy-eighth
2024		Philémon Yang (born 1947)	Cameroon	Africa	Seventy-ninth
2025		Annalena Baerbock (born 1980)	Germany	WEOG	Eightieth
2026		Khalilur Rahman (born 1954)	Bangladesh	Asia-Pacific	Eighty-first

=== Abbreviations ===
Pre-1966

- COS: Commonwealth Seat
- EAS: Eastern European and Asian Seat
- LAS: Latin American Seat
- MES: Middle Eastern Seat
- WES: Western European Seat

Since 1966

- Africa: African Group
- Asia-Pacific: Asian Group, since 2011 the Asia-Pacific Group
- EEG: Eastern European Group
- GRULAC: Latin American and Caribbean Group
- WEOG: Western European and Others Group

== See also ==
- President of the United Nations Security Council
- President of the United Nations Economic and Social Council
- Vice-President of the United Nations General Assembly
- High-Level Week of the 80th Session of the United Nations General Assembly 2025
- List of UN General Assembly sessions
