= List of UN General Assembly sessions =

The United Nations General Assembly (UNGA) holds an annual regular session that formally opens on the third Tuesday of September. Each session is presided over by an elected President and conducted in the presence of the Secretary-General. Sessions formally close just before the following session opens.

== Regular sessions ==
#	Session	Year(s)	President	Country	Secretary-General	Opening Date	Closing Date
81	81st	2026–2027	Dr. Khalilur Rahman	Bangladesh	António Guterres	8 September 2026	ongoing
80	80th	2025–2026	Annalena Baerbock	Germany	António Guterres	9 September 2025	8 September 2026
79	79th	2024–2025	Philemon Yang	Cameroon	António Guterres	10 September 2024	8 September 2025
78	78th	2023–2024	Dennis Francis	Trinidad and Tobago	António Guterres	5 September 2023	9 September 2024
77	77th	2022–2023	Csaba Kőrösi	Hungary	António Guterres	13 September 2022	4 September 2023
76	76th	2021–2022	Abdulla Shahid	Maldives	António Guterres	14 September 2021	12 September 2022
75	75th	2020–2021	Volkan Bozkır	Turkey	António Guterres	15 September 2020	13 September 2021
74	74th	2019–2020	Tijjani Muhammad-Bande	Nigeria	António Guterres	17 September 2019	14 September 2020
73	73rd	2018–2019	María Fernanda Espinosa Garcés	Ecuador	António Guterres	18 September 2018	16 September 2019
72	72nd	2017–2018	Miroslav Lajčák	Slovakia	António Guterres	12 September 2017	17 September 2018
71	71st	2016–2017	Peter Thomson	Fiji	Ban Ki-moon	13 September 2016	11 September 2017
70	70th	2015–2016	Mogens Lykketoft	Denmark	Ban Ki-moon	15 September 2015	12 September 2016
69	69th	2014–2015	Sam Kutesa	Uganda	Ban Ki-moon	16 September 2014	14 September 2015
68	68th	2013–2014	John W. Ashe	Antigua and Barbuda	Ban Ki-moon	17 September 2013	15 September 2014
67	67th	2012–2013	Vuk Jeremić	Serbia	Ban Ki-moon	18 September 2012	16 September 2013
66	66th	2011–2012	Nassir Abdulaziz Al-Nasser	Qatar	Ban Ki-moon	13 September 2011	17 September 2012
65	65th	2010–2011	Joseph Deiss	Switzerland	Ban Ki-moon	14 September 2010	12 September 2011
64	64th	2009–2010	Ali Abdussalam Treki	Libya	Ban Ki-moon	15 September 2009	13 September 2010
63	63rd	2008–2009	Miguel d'Escoto Brockmann	Nicaragua	Ban Ki-moon	16 September 2008	14 September 2009
62	62nd	2007–2008	Srgjan Kerim	North Macedonia	Ban Ki-moon	18 September 2007	15 September 2008
61	61st	2006–2007	Haya Rashed Al Khalifa	Bahrain	Kofi Annan	12 September 2006	17 September 2007
60	60th	2005–2006	Jan Eliasson	Sweden	Kofi Annan	13 September 2005	11 September 2006
59	59th	2004–2005	Jean Ping	Gabon	Kofi Annan	14 September 2004	12 September 2005
58	58th	2003–2004	Julian Robert Hunte	Saint Lucia	Kofi Annan	16 September 2003	13 September 2004
57	57th	2002–2003	Jan Kavan	Czech Republic	Kofi Annan	10 September 2002	15 September 2003
56	56th	2001–2002	Han Seung-soo	South Korea	Kofi Annan	12 September 2001	10 September 2002
55	55th	2000–2001	Harri Holkeri	Finland	Kofi Annan	5 September 2000	11 September 2001
54	54th	1999–2000	Theo-Ben Gurirab	Namibia	Kofi Annan	14 September 1999	4 September 2000
53	53rd	1998–1999	Didier Opertti	Uruguay	Kofi Annan	15 September 1998	13 September 1999
52	52nd	1997–1998	Hennadiy Udovenko	Ukraine	Kofi Annan	16 September 1997	14 September 1998
51	51st	1996–1997	Razali Ismail	Malaysia	Boutros Boutros-Ghali	17 September 1996	15 September 1997
50	50th	1995–1996	Diogo Freitas do Amaral	Portugal	Boutros Boutros-Ghali	19 September 1995	16 September 1996
49	49th	1994–1995	Amara Essy	Côte d'Ivoire	Boutros Boutros-Ghali	20 September 1994	18 September 1995
48	48th	1993–1994	Samuel R. Insanally	Guyana	Boutros Boutros-Ghali	21 September 1993	19 September 1994
47	47th	1992–1993	Stoyan Ganev	Bulgaria	Boutros Boutros-Ghali	15 September 1992	20 September 1993
46	46th	1991–1992	Samir Shihabi	Saudi Arabia	Javier Pérez de Cuéllar	17 September 1991	14 September 1992
45	45th	1990–1991	Guido de Marco	Malta	Javier Pérez de Cuéllar	18 September 1990	16 September 1991
44	44th	1989–1990	Joseph Nanven Garba	Nigeria	Javier Pérez de Cuéllar	19 September 1989	17 September 1990
43	43rd	1988–1989	Dante Caputo	Argentina	Javier Pérez de Cuéllar	20 September 1988 (Note: Part of the 43rd session was held in Geneva, Switzerland in December 1988 to enable Yasser Arafat to address the Assembly after the United States denied him a visa to enter New York City.)	18 September 1989
42	42nd	1987–1988	Peter Florin	East Germany	Javier Pérez de Cuéllar	15 September 1987	19 September 1988
41	41st	1986–1987	Humayun Rasheed Choudhury	Bangladesh	Javier Pérez de Cuéllar	16 September 1986	15 September 1987
40	40th	1985–1986	Jaime de Piniés	Spain	Javier Pérez de Cuéllar	17 September 1985	15 September 1986
39	39th	1984–1985	Paul Lusaka	Zambia	Javier Pérez de Cuéllar	18 September 1984	16 September 1985
38	38th	1983–1984	Jorge Illueca	Panama	Javier Pérez de Cuéllar	20 September 1983	17 September 1984
37	37th	1982–1983	Imre Hollai	Hungary	Javier Pérez de Cuéllar	21 September 1982	19 September 1983
36	36th	1981–1982	Ismat Kittani	Iraq	Kurt Waldheim	15 September 1981	20 September 1982
35	35th	1980–1981	Rüdiger von Wechmar	West Germany	Kurt Waldheim	16 September 1980	14 September 1981
34	34th	1979–1980	Salim Ahmed Salim	Tanzania	Kurt Waldheim	18 September 1979	15 September 1980
33	33rd	1978–1979	Indalecio Liévano	Colombia	Kurt Waldheim	25 September 1978	17 September 1979
32	32nd	1977–1978	Lazar Mojsov	Yugoslavia	Kurt Waldheim	20 September 1977	19 September 1978
31	31st	1976–1977	Hamilton Shirley Amerasinghe	Sri Lanka	Kurt Waldheim	21 September 1976	20 September 1977
30	30th	1975–1976	Gaston Thorn	Luxembourg	Kurt Waldheim	16 September 1975	20 September 1976
29	29th	1974–1975	Abdelaziz Bouteflika	Algeria	Kurt Waldheim	17 September 1974	15 September 1975
28	28th	1973–1974	Leopoldo Benites	Ecuador	Kurt Waldheim	18 September 1973	17 September 1974
27	27th	1972–1973	Stanisław Trepczynski	Poland	Kurt Waldheim	19 September 1972	18 September 1973
26	26th	1971–1972	Adam Malik	Indonesia	U Thant	21 September 1971	19 September 1972
25	25th	1970–1971	Edward Hambro	Norway	U Thant	15 September 1970	20 September 1971
24	24th	1969–1970	Angie Brooks	Liberia	U Thant	16 September 1969	14 September 1970
23	23rd	1968–1969	Emilio Arenales Catalán	Guatemala	U Thant	24 September 1968	15 September 1969
22	22nd	1967–1968	Corneliu Mănescu	Romania	U Thant	19 September 1967	23 September 1968
21	21st	1966–1967	Abdul Rahman Pazhwak	Afghanistan	U Thant	20 September 1966	19 September 1967
20	20th	1965–1966	Amintore Fanfani	Italy	U Thant	21 September 1965	20 September 1966
19	19th	1964–1965	Alex Quaison-Sackey	Ghana	U Thant	1 December 1964	18 February 1965
18	18th	1963–1964	Carlos Sosa Rodríguez	Venezuela	U Thant	17 September 1963	17 September 1964
17	17th	1962–1963	Muhammad Zafrulla Khan	Pakistan	U Thant	18 September 1962	17 September 1963
16	16th	1961–1962	Mongi Slim	Tunisia	U Thant (Note: Dag Hammarskjöld died on 18 September 1961, one day before the 16th session opened. The assembly had to vote on a successor)	19 September 1961	18 September 1962
15	15th	1960–1961	Frederick Boland	Ireland	Dag Hammarskjöld	20 September 1960	21 April 1961
14	14th	1959–1960	Víctor Andrés Belaúnde	Peru	Dag Hammarskjöld	15 September 1959	19 September 1960
13	13th	1958–1959	Charles Malik	Lebanon	Dag Hammarskjöld	16 September 1958	14 September 1959
12	12th	1957–1958	Leslie Munro	New Zealand	Dag Hammarskjöld	17 September 1957	15 September 1958
11	11th	1956–1957	Prince Wan Waithayakon	Thailand	Dag Hammarskjöld	12 November 1956	8 March 1957
10	10th	1955–1956	José Maza	Chile	Dag Hammarskjöld	20 September 1955	12 November 1956
9	9th	1954–1955	Eelco van Kleffens	Netherlands	Dag Hammarskjöld	21 September 1954	19 September 1955
8	8th	1953–1954	Vijaya Lakshmi Pandit	India	Dag Hammarskjöld	15 September 1953	20 September 1954
7	7th	1952–1953	Lester B. Pearson	Canada	Trygve Lie	14 October 1952	28 August 1953
6	6th	1951–1952	Luis Padilla Nervo	Mexico	Trygve Lie	6 November 1951	5 February 1952
5	5th	1950–1951	Nasrollah Entezam	Iran	Trygve Lie	19 September 1950	1 November 1951
4	4th	1949–1950	Carlos P. Romulo	Philippines	Trygve Lie	20 September 1949	14 September 1950
3	3rd	1948–1949	Herbert Vere Evatt	Australia	Trygve Lie	21 September 1948	18 May 1949
2	2nd	1947–1948	Oswaldo Aranha	Brazil	Trygve Lie	16 September 1947	29 November 1947
1	1st	1946	Paul-Henri Spaak	Belgium	Trygve Lie	10 January 1946 (Note: The 1st session was split in two parts, taking place in both London and New York City)	15 December 1946

== See also ==
- List of General debates of the United Nations General Assembly
- President of the United Nations General Assembly
- Secretary-General of the United Nations
