= List of international presidential trips made by Mahmoud Abbas =

Mahmoud Abbas, the second Chairman of the Palestine Liberation Organization and the second President of the State of Palestine, has made international trips to countries since he assumed the presidency on 15 January 2005.

== Summary ==
The number of visits per country where President Abbas traveled are:

- One visit to Azerbaijan, Bangladesh, Chile, Cuba, Finland, Germany, Greece, Kazakhstan, Luxembourg, Morocco, Oman, Poland, Romania, Spain, Sweden, Tanzania, the United Kingdom, Venezuela, and Yemen
- Two visits to Bahrain, China, Iraq, Kuwait, Mauritania, Pakistan, South Africa, South Korea, Sudan, Switzerland, Syria, United Arab Emirates, Vatican City
- Three visits to India, Italy, Lebanon, Libya, Norway and Tunisia
- Four visits to Belgium
- Five visits to Algeria, France, Japan
- Seven visits to Jordan and Qatar
- Nine visits to Saudi Arabia
- Ten visits to Russia
- Eleven visits to the United States
- Sixteen visits to Turkey
- Nineteen visits to Egypt

World map highlighting countries visited by Mahmoud Abbas during his presidency, as of November 2026. One visit Two visits Three visits Four visits Five visits Six visits Seven or more visits Palestine

== 2005 ==
Country	Areas visited	Date(s)	Notes
Egypt	Cairo	28–29 January	State visit. Met with President Hosni Mubarak.
Turkey	Ankara	1–2 February	State visit. Met with President Ahmet Necdet Sezer, Prime Minister Recep Tayyip Erdoğan.
Egypt	Sharm El-Sheikh	8 February	Working visit. Attended the Sharm El Sheikh four-party summit mediated by President Hosni Mubarak. Met with Prime Minister of Israel Ariel Sharon and King of Jordan Abdullah II.
Algeria	Algiers	22–23 March	Working Visit. Attended the Arab League Summit.
Japan	Tokyo	15–17 May	State visit. Met with Prime Minister Junichiro Koizumi.
China	Beijing	17–19 May	State visit. Met with President Hu Jintao.
Pakistan	Islamabad	19–20 May	State visit. Met with President Pervez Musharraf
India	New Delhi	20–21 May	State visit. Met with President A. P. J. Abdul Kalam, Prime Minister Manmohan Singh
United States	Washington D.C.	25–27 May	State visit. Met with President George W. Bush.
Mauritania	Nouakchott	2–3 July	Met with President Maaouya Ould Sid'Ahmed Taya.
Syria	Damascus	6–7 July	State visit. Met with President Bashar al-Assad.
Lebanon	Beirut	8–10 July	State visit. Met with President Émile Lahoud.
Saudi Arabia	Riyadh	1–2 August	Attended the funeral of King Fahd of Saudi Arabia
United States	New York City	14–17 September	Attended the 60th United Nations General Assembly.
United States	Washington D.C.	19–21 October	State visit. Met with President George W. Bush.

== 2006 ==
Country	Areas visited	Date(s)	Notes
Sudan	Khartoum	27–30 March	Working visit. Attended the 2006 Arab League summit.
South Africa	Cape Town, Johannesburg	29 March – 1 April	State visit. Met with President Thabo Mbeki
Tanzania	Zanzibar	1 April	State visit. Met with President Jakaya Kikwete.
Morocco	Casablanca	12–14 April	State visit. Met with King Mohammed VI.
Turkey	Ankara	23–25 April	State visit. Met with President Ahmet Necdet Sezer, Prime Minister Recep Tayyip Erdoğan.
Norway	Oslo	25–26 April	State visit. Met with Prime Minister Jens Stoltenberg.
Finland	Helsinki	26–27 April	State visit. Met with President Tarja Halonen.
France	Paris	27–29 April	State visit. Met with President Jacques Chirac.
Jordan	Amman	29 April – 1 May	State visit. Met with King Abdullah II and Prime Minister Marouf al-Bakhit.
Russia	Sochi	14–15 May	State visit. Met with President Vladimir Putin.
France	Strasbourg	15–17 May	Working visit.
Egypt	Sharm El Sheikh	19–21 May	Working visit. Attended the World Economic Forum.
Tunisia	Tunis	30 May – 1 June	State visit. Met with President Zine El Abidine Ben Ali.
Algeria	Algiers	26 July	Working visit. Met with Prime Minister Abdelaziz Belkhadem.
Italy	Rome	27 July	Working visit. Met with Prime Minister Romano Prodi.
Egypt	Alexandria	28–29 July	State visit. Met with President Hosni Mubarak.
Saudi Arabia	Jeddah	30 July	State visit. Met with King Abdullah of Saudi Arabia
Kuwait	Kuwait City	30–31 July	Working visit. Met with Crown Prince Nawaf Al-Ahmad Al-Sabah.
Yemen	Sana'a	5 August	State visit. Met with President Ali Abdullah Saleh.
Sudan	Khartoum	6 August	State visit. Met with President Omar al-Bashir.
Tunisia	Tunis	7–8 August	State visit. Met with President Zine El Abidine Ben Ali
Libya	Tripoli	9 August	State visit. Met with Leader Muammar Gaddafi.
Bahrain	Manama	4–5 September	State visit. Met with King Hamad bin Isa Al Khalifa.
United Arab Emirates	Abu Dhabi	5 September	State visit. Met with President Khalifa bin Zayed Al Nahyan
United States	New York City	19–22 September	Working visit. Attended the 61th United Nations General Assembly, met with Presidents of South Africa, France, the U.S., Prime Ministers of Italy, Malaysia.

== 2007 ==
Country	Areas visited	Date(s)	Notes
France	Paris	24 February	Working visit. Met with President Jacques Chirac.
Russia	Moscow	29–31 July	Official working visit. Met with President Vladimir Putin.
United States	New York City	24–29 September	Attended the 62th United Nations General Assembly.
United States	Annapolis	26–28 November	Attended the Annapolis Conference.

== 2008 ==
Mahmoud Abbas and Vladimir Putin negotiations in Moscow, April 2008

Country	Areas visited	Date(s)	Notes
Russia	Moscow	17–19 April	Official visit. Met with President Vladimir Putin.
United States	Washington D.C.	23–24 April	Official visit. Met with President George W. Bush.
United States	New York City	22–26 September	Attended the 63th United Nations General Assembly.
India	New Delhi	6–9 October	State visit.
Russia	Moscow	22–24 December	Emergency revisit.

== 2009 ==
Country	Areas visited	Date(s)	Notes
Egypt	Cairo	16–17 May	Working visit. Met with President Hosni Mubarak.
Canada	Ottawa	24–26 May	Official visit. Met with Prime Minister Stephen Harper.
Libya	Tripoli	1–5 September	Attended the 40th anniversary of the Libyan Revolution
United States	New York City	21–26 September	Attended the 64th United Nations General Assembly.
Venezuela	Caracas	26–27 November	Official visit. Met with President Hugo Chavez.

== 2010 ==
Country	Areas visited	Date(s)	Notes
Japan	Tokyo, Hiroshima	7–10 February	Official visit. Met with Prime Minister Yukio Hatoyama.
South Korea	Seoul	10–11 February	Official visit.
Libya	Sirte	27 March	Attended the 2010 Arab League summit.
United States	Washington D.C.	8–10 June	Working visit.
United States	Washington D.C.	31 August – 3 September	Working visit.
United States	New York City	21–26 September	Attended the 65th United Nations General Assembly.

== 2011 ==
Country	Location	Date	Details
Egypt	Cairo	3–5 May	Working visit.
Azerbaijan	Baku	28–29 June	Official visit. Met with President Ilham Aliyev.
United States	New York City	19–24 September	Attended the 66th United Nations General Assembly.
France	Paris	13–14 December	Working visit. Met with President Nicolas Sarkozy.

== 2012 ==
Country	Location	Date	Details
Russia	Moscow	26–28 January	Working visit.
Turkey	Ankara	28–29 February	Working visit. Met with President Abdullah Gül and Prime Minister Recep Tayyip Erdoğan.
Japan	Tokyo	12–15 April	Official visit. Met with Prime Minister Noda Yoshihiko.
France	Paris	7–8 June	Working visit. Met with President of François Hollande.
Turkey	Istanbul	4 July	Attended the World Economic Forum Middle East and North Africa Regional Conference. Met with President Abdullah Gül and Prime Minister Recep Tayyip Erdoğan.
Egypt	Cairo	4–6 September	Working visit. Met with President Mohamed Morsi.
Turkey	Ankara	19–21 September	Working visit. Met with President Abdullah Gül and Prime Minister Recep Tayyip Erdoğan.
United States	New York City	24–28 September	Attended the 67th United Nations General Assembly.
United States	New York City	26–30 November	Working visit.
Turkey	Ankara	10–11 December	Official visit. Met with President Abdullah Gül and Prime Minister Recep Tayyip Erdoğan.

== 2013 ==
Country	Areas visited	Date(s)	Notes
Russia	Moscow	12–14 March	Official visit. Met with President Vladimir Putin.
Kuwait	Kuwait City	15 April	Special visit.
China	Beijing	5–7 May	State visit. Met with President Xi Jinping.
United States	Washington D.C.	28–30 July	Working visit.
Qatar	Doha	28–29 August	Working visit. Met with Emir Tamim bin Hamad Al Thani.
United States	New York City	23–27 September	Attended the 68th United Nations General Assembly.
Egypt	Cairo	9–11 November	Official visit.

== 2014 ==
Country	Areas visited	Date(s)	Notes
Russia	Moscow	26-28 Juary	Official visit. Met with President Vladimir Putin.
Jordan	Amman	26 March	Working visit.
France	Paris	8 June	Official visit. Met with President François Hollande.
Egypt	Cairo	16–17 July	Emergency visit. Met with President Abdel Fattah El-Sisi.
Turkey	Ankara	18 July	Emergency visit. Met with President Abdullah Gül and Prime Minister Recep Tayyip Erdoğan.
Qatar	Doha	20–22 August	Working visit. Met with Emir Tamim bin Hamad Al Thani and Hamas Political Director Khaled Mashal.
United States	New York City	22–27 September	Attended the 69th United Nations General Assembly.
Egypt	Cairo	11–12 October	Attended the International Contributor Conference for the Reconstruction of the Gaza Strip.
Jordan	Amman	12–13 November	Emergency visit.

== 2015 ==
Country	Location	Date	Details
Sweden	Stockholm	10–11 February	Met with King Carl XVI Gustaf and Prime Minister Stefan Löfven and opened the Palestinian embassy.
Belgium	Brussels	12 February	Working visit. Met with EU leaders.
Luxembourg	Luxembourg City	14 February	Met with Prime Minister Xavier Bettel.
Switzerland	Bern	9 March	Met with President Simonetta Sommaruga.
Egypt	Sharm El-Sheikh	13–15 March	Attended the Egypt Economic Development Conference.
Egypt	Sharm El-Sheikh	27–29 March	Attended the 32th AL summit.
Qatar	Doha	7 April	Working visit. Met with Emir Tamim bin Hamad Al Thani.
Russia	Moscow	13 April	Working visit. Met with President Vladimir Putin.
Russia	Moscow	8 May	Attended the 2015 Moscow Victory Day Parade.
Vatican City	Vatican City	16 May	Met with Pope Francis.
Qatar	Doha	31 May	Working visit. Met with Deputy Emir Abdullah bin Hamad Al Thani.
Russia	Moscow	22 September	Attended the Opening Ceremony Moscow Cathedral Mosque.
United States	New York City	26–30 September	Attended 70th United Nations General Assembly.
Switzerland	Geneva	28 October	Attended the UN Human Rights Council Special Meeting.
Egypt	Cairo	7–8 November	Official visit. Met with President Abdel Fattah el-Sisi.
Greece	Athens	20 December	Met with Prime Minister Alexis Tsipras.

== 2016 ==
Mahmoud Abbas and Vladimir Putin negotiations in Moscow, April 2016

Country	Location	Date	Details
Japan	Tokyo	14–17 February	Working Visit. Met with Prime Minister Abe Shinzo.
South Korea	Seoul	17–19 February	Official visit.
Jordan	Amman	21 February	Working visit.
Indonesia	Jakarta	7–8 March	Attended the OIC Special summit.
Russia	Moscow	15-18 April	Met with President Vladimir Putin.
South Africa	Cape Town	25 May	Met with President Jacob Zuma.
Egypt	Cairo	28 May	Met with President Abdel Fattah el-Sisi.
Belgium	Brussels	23 June	Met with European Council President Donald Tusk.
Poland	Warsaw	6–7 September	Official visit. Met with President Andrzej Duda.
Mauritania	Nouakchott	14–15 September	Official visit. Met with President Mohamed Ould Abdel Aziz.
United States	New York City	22 September	Attended the 71th United Nations General Assembly.
Turkey	Ankara	24 October	Met with President Recep Tayyip Erdoğan.

== 2017 ==
Date	Country	Location	Details
13 January 2017	Holy See	Vatican City	
30 January–1 February 2017	Pakistan	Islamabad	
1–3 February 2017	Bangladesh	Dhaka	
23–25 February 2017	Lebanon	Beirut	
27 March 2017	Belgium	Brussels	
29 April 2017	Egypt		
30 April 2017	Jordan		
3 May 2017	USA	Washington D.C.	
11 May 2017	Russia	Moscow	
15–18 May 2017	India	New Delhi	
17 July 2017	China		
27–29 August 2017	Turkey		
11 November 2017	Kuwait	Kuwait City	
10 December 2017	Egypt	Cairo	
12 December 2017	Turkey	Istanbul	Attended the Sixth Extraordinary Session of the Islamic Summit
19 December 2017	Saudi Arabia	Riyadh	
22 December 2017	France	Paris	

== 2018 ==
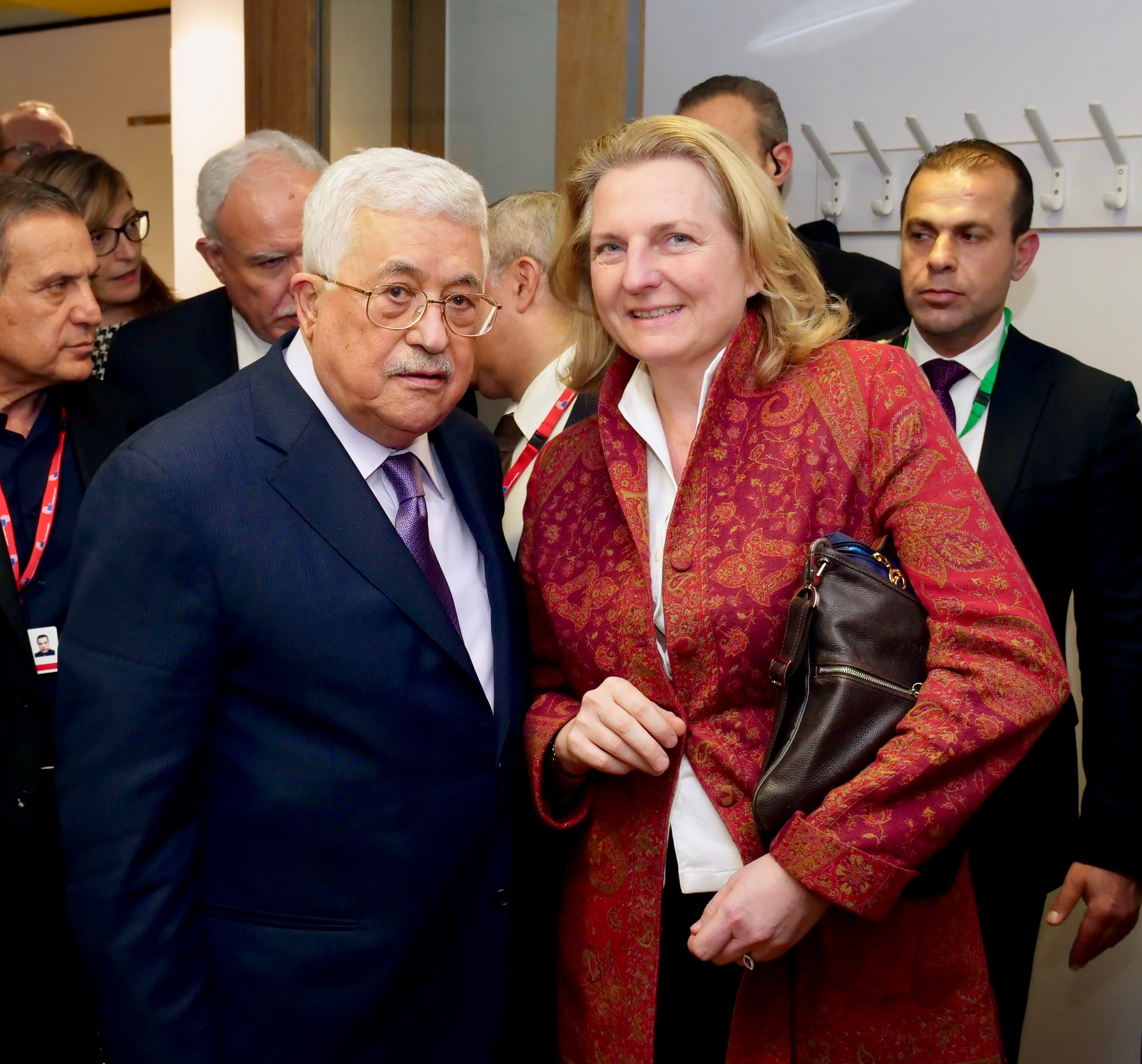
Mahmoud Abbas and Karin Kneissl in Brüssels, January 2018.

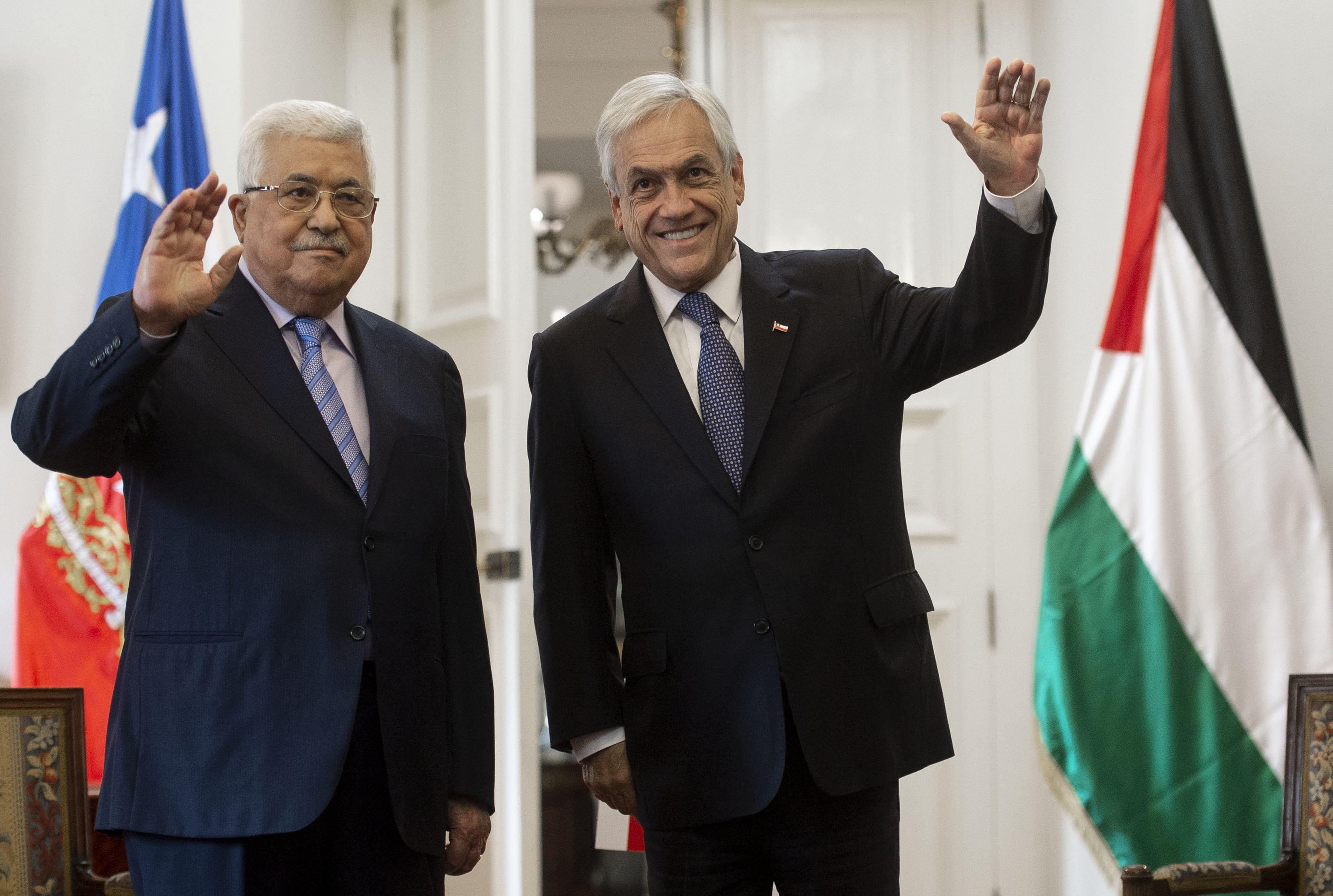
President Abbas with President Sebastián Piñera during his visit to Chile, May 2018

Mahmoud Abbas and Vladimir Putin negotiations in Moscow, July 2018

Date	Country	Location	Details
22 January 2018	Belgium	Brussels	Met with European Union and it's member states offisials to discuss theme of Palestine recognition
29 January 2018	Jordan	Amman	
20 February 2018	USA	New York	
7–8 May 2018	Venezuela	Caracas	
9–10 May 2018	Chile	Santiago	Met with President Sebastián Piñera
10–12 May 2018	Cuba	Havana	
13 May 2018	India	New Delhi	
14–15 July 2018	Russia	Moscow	Held talks with President Vladimir Putin
21–27 September 2018	USA	New York	Met with state leaders and addressed the 73rd session of the General Assembly
21 October 2018	Oman	Muscat	
2 December 2018	Italy	Rome	

== 2019 ==
Date	Country	Location	Details
March 2019	Iraq	Baghdad	
April 2019	Egypt	Cairo	
May 2019	Qatar	Doha	
September 2019	Norway	Oslo	
September 2019	USA	New York	Met with French President Emmanuel Macron
October 2019	Saudi Arabia	Riyadh	Met with King Salman bin Abdulaziz
October 2019	Japan	Tokyo	Met with Prime Minister Shinzo Abe

== 2020 ==
Country	Location	Date	Details
United States	New York City	9–11 February	Working visit.
Jordan	Amman	29 November	Working visit.
Egypt	Cairo	30 November	Working visit.
Qatar	Doha	13–15 December	Working visit.

== 2021 ==
Country	Location	Date	Details
Germany	Berlin	5–8 April	Working visit.
Turkey	Ankara	10–12 July	Met with President Recep Tayyip Erdoğan.
Egypt	Cairo	1–2 September	Met with President Abdel Fattah El-Sisi and King of Jordan Abdullah II.
Italy	Roma	1–3 November	Official visit.
Vatican City	Vatican City	4 November	Met with Pope Francis.
Russia	Sochi	22–23 November	Met with President Vladimir Putin.
Qatar	Doha	29–30 November	Met with Emir Tamim bin Hamad Al Thani.
Algeria	Algiers	7–9 December	Met with President Abdelmadjid Tebboune.
Tunisia	Tunis	December 2021	Met with President Kais Saied.

== 2022 ==
Country	Location	Date	Details
Egypt	Cairo	9 January	Met with President Abdel Fattah El-Sisi.
Jordan	Amman	27 April	Met with King Abdullah II.
UAE	Abu Dhabi	15 May	Offer condolences on the death of Khalifa bin Zayed Al Nahyan and met with President Mohamed bin Zayed Al Nahyan.
Jordan	Amman	26 June	Met with King Abdullah II.
Algeria	Algiers	5 July	Attended the commemoration of the 60th anniversary of Algeria's independence.
Romania	Bucharest	19 July	Met with President Klaus Iohannis.
France	Paris	20 July	Met with President Emmanuel Macron
Germany	Berlin	16 August	Met with Prime Minister Olaf Scholz.
Turkey	Ankara	22–24 August	State visit. Met with President Recep Tayyip Erdoğan.
United States	New York City	19–24 September	Attended the 77th United Nations General Assembly.
Kazakhstan	Astana	13 October	Attended the CICA summit.
Algeria	Algiers	1 November	Attended the 2022 Arab League summit

== 2023 ==
Country	Location	Date	Details
Saudi Arabia	Jeddah	19 May	Attended the 2023 Arab League summit.
Turkey	Ankara	25 July	Meeting with President Recep Tayyip Erdoğan and Hamas leader Ismail Haniyeh.
Egypt	Cairo	29 July	Meeting of the General Secretaries of the Palestinian factions and held talks with President Abdel Fattah El-Sisi.
Egypt	El Alamein	14 August	Tripartite summit with President Abdel Fattah el-Sisi and King Abdullah II of Jordan.
United States	New York City	17–22 September	Attended the 78th United Nations General Assembly.
Saudi Arabia	Riyadh	10–11 November	Attended the Arab-Islamic emergency summit.

== 2024 ==
Country	Location	Date	Details
Saudi Arabia	Riyadh	27–29 April	Attended a World Economic Forum meeting and met with the Crown prince Mohamed bin Salman.
Bahrain	Manama	16–17 May	Attended the 2024 Arab League summit.
Russia	Moscow	13 August	Met with President Vladimir Putin.
Turkey	Ankara	14–15 August	Met with President Recep Tayyip Erdoğan and addressed the Grand National Assembly of Turkey.
Saudi Arabia	Riyadh	26 August	Met with the Crown prince Mohamed bin Salman.
Spain	Madrid	17–18 September	Met with Prime Minister Pedro Sánchez.
United States	New York City	20–27 September	Attended the 79th United Nations General Assembly.
Russia	Kazan	22–24 October	Attended the 16th BRICS summit.
Egypt	Cairo	3–4 November	Attended the World Urban Forum.
Saudi Arabia	Riyadh	10–12 November	Attended the Arab-Islamic summit.

== 2025 ==
Country	Location	Date	Details
Egypt	Cairo	3–5 March	Attended the Arab League emergency summit.
Syria	Damascus	18 April	For the first time since the collapse of the Assad regime visit. Met with President Ahmed al-Sharaa.
Russia	Moscow	8–9 May	Attended the 2025 Moscow Victory Day Parade.
Iraq	Baghdad	16–17 May	Attended the 2025 Arab League summit.
Lebanon	Beirut	21–22 May	State visit.
United Kingdom	London	7–9 September	State visit.
Qatar	Doha	15–16 September	Attended the 2025 Arab–Islamic extraordinary summit.
Turkey	Ankara	17–19 September	State visit.
Egypt	Cairo, Giza, Sharm El-Sheikh	31 October – 1 November	Attended the Grand Egyptian Museum Opening ceremony and Gaza peace summit.
France	Paris	11–12 November	Official visit.

== 2026 ==
Country	Location	Date	Details
Russia	Moscow	21–22 January	Met with President Vladimir Putin.
Norway	Oslo	10–11 February	Met with King Harald V and Prime Minister Jonas Gahr Støre.
Qatar	Doha	15 July	Offering condolences on the death of the former Emir, Hamad bin Khalifa Al Thani.
Turkey	Ankara	12–13 August	Met with President Recep Tayyip Erdoğan.
Egypt	Cairo	15–16 September	Met with President Abdel Fattah El-Sisi.
Cyprus	Nicosia	29–30 October	Met with President Nikos Christodoulides.

== Future trips ==
Country	Location	Date	Details
Turkey	Antalya	11–12 November	Abbas is scheduled to attend the 2026 United Nations Climate Change Conference.
Saudi Arabia	Jeddah or Riyadh	To be announced	Abbas is scheduled to attend the AL summit.
Azerbaijan	Baku	23-24 June 2027	Abbas is scheduled to attend the 16th OIC summit.
