= Thirty-seventh session of the United Nations General Assembly =

- 21 September 1982 – 19 September 1983 37th session 37th general debate
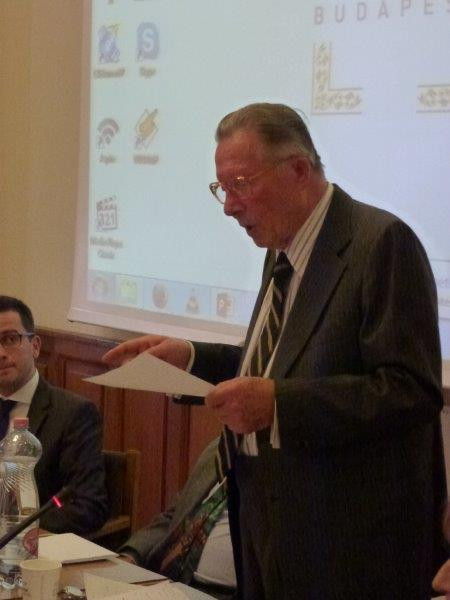
- President of the 37th General Assembly, Imre Hollai
- Host country: United Nations
- Participants: United Nations Member States
- President: Imre Hollai
- Secretary-General: Javier Pérez de Cuéllar

The thirty-seventh session of the United Nations General Assembly opened on 21 September 1982 at the UN Headquarters in New York. The president was Imre Hollai, former Ambassador to the United Nations of Hungary.

The main issue addressed was the need for Nuclear disarmament

== See also ==
- List of UN General Assembly sessions
