= Second session of the United Nations General Assembly =

- 16 September – 20 December 1947 2nd session 2nd general debate
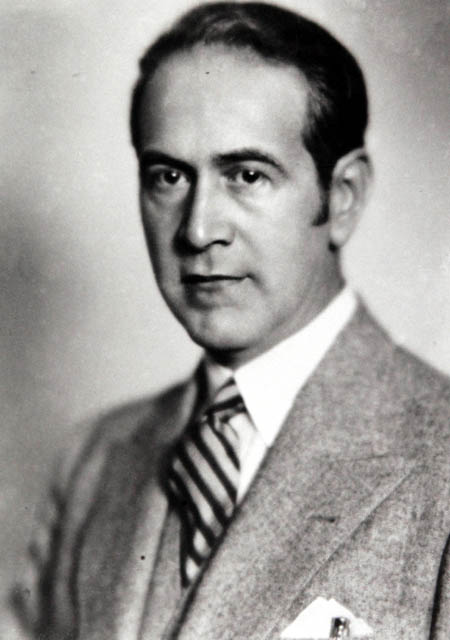
- President of the 2nd General Assembly, Oswaldo Aranha
- Host country: United Nations
- Venue: Flushing Meadows–Corona Park, New York, United States
- Participants: United Nations Member States
- President: Oswaldo Aranha
- Secretary-General: Trygve Lie

The second session of the United Nations General Assembly opened on 16 September 1947 in Flushing Meadows–Corona Park, New York, United States. The president was Oswaldo Aranha, former Minister of Foreign Affairs of Brazil. The session saw the adoption on 29 November 1947 of Resolution 181(II), the United Nations Partition Plan for Palestine, which recommended the partition of the British Mandate for Palestine into two independent Jewish and Arab states. Aranha, an outspoken advocate for the plan, postponed the vote by several days to secure sufficient support for its passage.

== See also ==
- List of UN General Assembly sessions
- List of General debates of the United Nations General Assembly
