= Fifty-seventh session of the United Nations General Assembly =

- 10 September 2002 – 15 September 2003
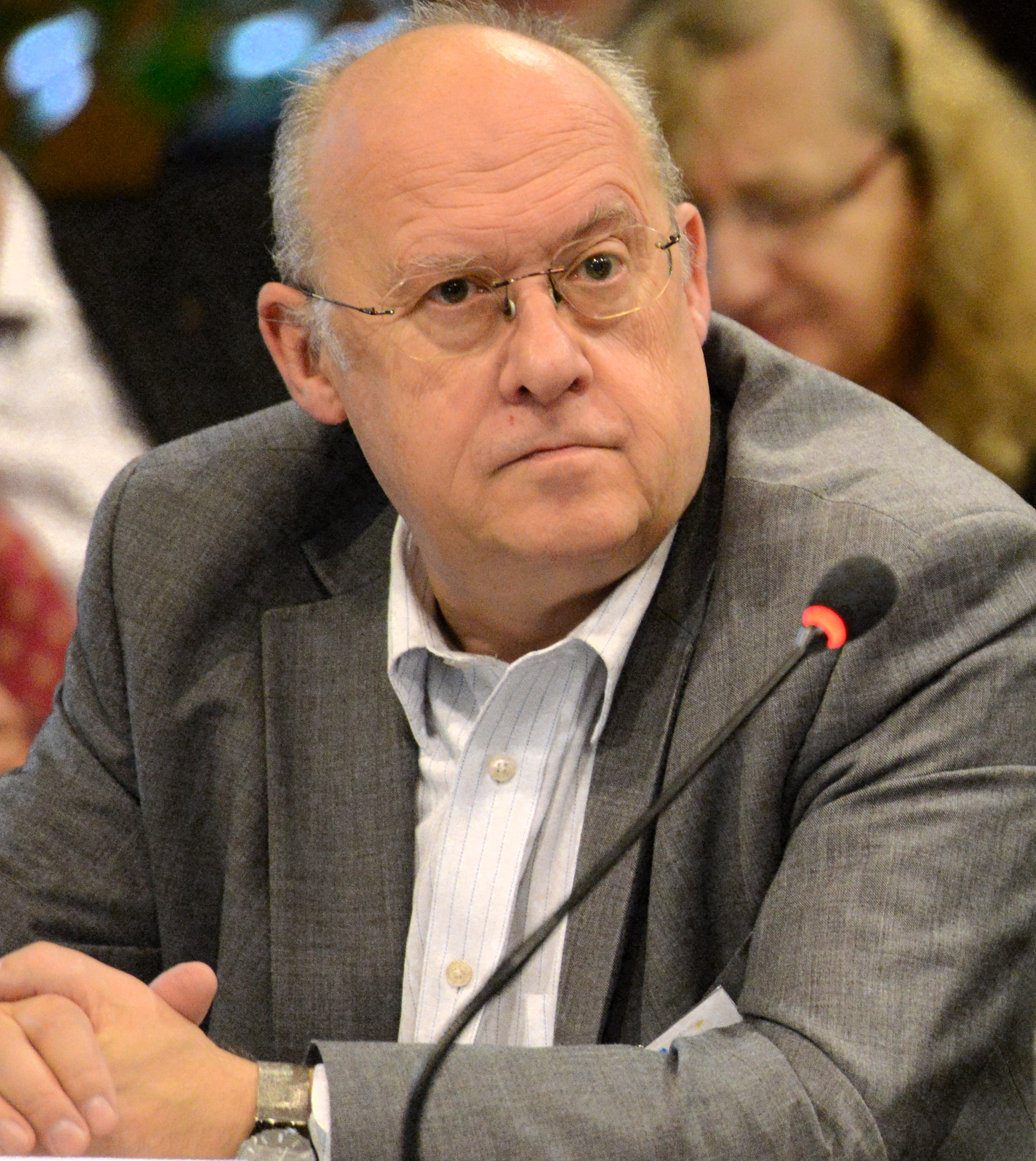
- President of the 57th General Assembly, Jan Kavan
- Host country: United Nations
- Participants: United Nations Member States
- President: Jan Kavan
- Secretary-General: Kofi Annan

The fifty-seventh session of the United Nations General Assembly was the session of the United Nations General Assembly that ran from 10 September 2002 to 15 September 2003. The president of the General Assembly was from the Eastern European Group.

== Organisation for the session ==
=== President ===
The president was Jan Kavan, former Minister of Foreign Affairs of the Czech Republic.

=== Vice Presidents ===
The General Assembly elected the following countries as the vice-presidents of the 57th session:

The five permanent members of the United Nations Security Council:

- China
- France
- Russia
- United Kingdom
- United States

As well as the following nations:

- Austria
- Bahrain
- Chad
- Ecuador
- Egypt
- Ethiopia
- Gambia
- Indonesia
- Kazakhstan
- Mexico
- Portugal
- Qatar
- Swaziland
- Togo
- Barbados
- Vietnam

== See also ==
- List of UN General Assembly sessions
- List of General debates of the United Nations General Assembly
