= Fortieth session of the United Nations General Assembly =

- 17 September 1985 – 15 September 1986 40th session 40th general debate
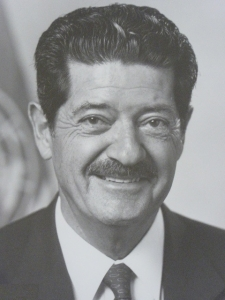
- President of the 40th General Assembly, Jaime de Piniés
- Host country: United Nations
- Participants: United Nations Member States
- President: Jaime de Piniés
- Secretary-General: Javier Pérez de Cuéllar

The fortieth session of the United Nations General Assembly opened on 17 September 1985 at the UN Headquarters in New York. The president was Jaime de Piniés, previously Ambassador of Spain to the United Nations

== See also ==
- List of UN General Assembly sessions
- List of General debates of the United Nations General Assembly
