= Fifty-eighth session of the United Nations General Assembly =

- 16 September 2003 – 13 September 2004
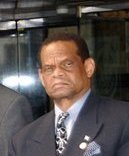
- President of the 58th General Assembly, Julian Hunte
- Host country: United Nations
- Participants: United Nations Member States
- President: Julian Hunte
- Secretary-General: Kofi Annan

The fifty-eighth session of the United Nations General Assembly was the session of the United Nations General Assembly that ran from 16 September 2003 until 13 September 2004. The President was from the Latin American and Caribbean Group.

== Organisation for the Session ==
=== President ===
The president was Julian Hunte, former Minister of Foreign Affairs of Saint Lucia.

=== Vice-Presidents ===
The General Assembly elected the following countries as the vice-presidents of the 58th session:

The five permanent members of the United Nations Security Council:

- China
- France
- Russia
- United Kingdom
- United States

As well as the following nations:

- Cape Verde
- Equatorial Guinea
- Haiti
- Honduras
- Iran
- Luxembourg
- Madagascar
- Malawi
- Morocco
- Myanmar
- Netherlands
- Senegal
- Slovenia
- Tajikistan
- Turkmenistan
- Yemen

=== Committees ===
The Chairpersons of the General Assembly Committees in its 58th session were:

Name	Country	Committee
Jarmo Sareva	Finland	Disarmament and International Security
Iftekhar Ahmed Chowdhury	Bangladesh	Economic and Financial
Martin Belinga-Eboutou	Cameroon	Social, Humanitarian and Cultural
Enrique Loedel	Uruguay	Special Political and Decolonization
Hynek Kmonicek	Czech Republic	Financial and Budgetary
Lauro Baja	Philippines	Legal

== See also ==
- List of UN General Assembly sessions
- List of General debates of the United Nations General Assembly
