= List of presidential trips made by Ronald Reagan (1983) =

This is a list of presidential trips made by Ronald Reagan during 1983, the third year of his presidency as the 40th president of the United States. International trips are highlighted in blue.

This list excludes trips made within Washington, D.C., the U.S. federal capital in which the White House, the official residence and principal workplace of the president, is located. It also excludes the capital's immediate surroundings in Maryland and Virginia, such as Andrews Air Force Base in Maryland, where the president typically boards Air Force One for all trips outside the area. Also excluded are trips to Camp David, the country residence of the president, and to Reagan's Rancho del Cielo ranch in Santa Barbara County, California.

== January ==
State or country	Areas visited	Dates	Details
California	Palm Springs, Indian Wells	January 1–2	Stayed at Sunnylands. Attended a dinner at The Vintage Club in Indian Wells.
Texas	Dallas	January 11	Addressed the American Farm Bureau Federation meeting at the Dallas Convention Center. Visited the North Texas Food Bank.
Illinois	Chicago	January 19	Spoke at Providence St. Mel School. Raised funds for Senator Charles H. Percy at The Conrad Hilton.
Massachusetts	Boston, Bedford	January 26	Toured the OIC–IBM High Technology Training Center. Had a beer at the Eire Pub. Toured a Digital Equipment Corporation plant in Roxbury. Took questions from the Massachusetts High Technology Council at Millipore Corporation headquarters in Bedford.

== February ==
State or country	Areas visited	Dates	Details
Missouri	Fenton	February 1	Toured the Chrysler Saint Louis Assembly plant. Took questions from the St. Louis Regional Chamber at the Cervantes Convention Center.

== March ==
State or country	Areas visited	Dates	Details
California	Los Angeles, San Francisco	March 3–5	Traveled with Queen Elizabeth II, who had been visiting Reagan at his ranch in Santa Barbara. Addressed the United States Olympic Committee at The Biltmore Los Angeles. Attended a dinner with the Queen at the de Young Museum. Stayed at the St. Francis Hotel. Addressed the Commonwealth Club of California at the Hilton San Francisco Union Square. Stayed with the Queen aboard her yacht, HMY Britannia, at Pier 50.
Oregon	Klamath Falls	March 5	Took questions from the Western Forest Products Coalition at a Weyerhaeuser sawmill.
Florida	Lake Buena Vista, Orlando	March 8	Visited Walt Disney World's EPCOT Center. Delivered the "Evil Empire" speech to the National Association of Evangelicals convention at the Sheraton Twin Towers Hotel in Orlando.
California	Los Angeles	March 30–31	Stayed at the Century Plaza Hotel. Took questions from the Los Angeles World Affairs Council at The Beverly Hilton.

== April ==
State or country	Areas visited	Dates	Details
California	Solvang	April 3	Attended Easter service at the Santa Ynez Valley Presbyterian Church.
Pennsylvania	Pittsburgh	April 6	Toured the local Control Data Institute. Addressed the National Conference on the Dislocated Worker at the Pittsburgh Hilton.
New York	New York	April 27	Met with winners of the New York Daily News' Crime Fighter Award at the NYPD Midtown South precinct station. Took questions from the American Newspaper Publishers Association convention at the Waldorf Astoria New York.
Texas	Houston	April 29–30	Spoke at the Cenikor Foundation Center. Raised funds for Senator John Tower at the Albert Thomas Convention Center. Stayed at the Hyatt Regency Houston Downtown, where he met with the Houston Cougars men's basketball team, which had lost the NCAA national championship game earlier in the month.

== May ==
State or country	Areas visited	Dates	Details
Texas	San Antonio	May 5	Attended a Cinco de Mayo celebration at Plaza Nueva. Visited a local business, McAllister's Cafe.
Arizona	Phoenix, Sun City	May 5–6	Visited the home of his mother-in-law, Edith Luckett Davis, in Phoenix. Stayed at the Arizona Biltmore Hotel. Attended service at Shepherd of the Desert Lutheran Church. Met with a local volunteer law enforcement group, the Sheriff's POSSE of Sun City. Addressed the National Rifle Association banquet at Phoenix Civic Plaza.
Ohio	Ashland	May 9	Attended the first annual John M. Ashbrook Memorial Dinner at Ashland College
Florida	Miami	May 20	Visited a Little Havana restaurant, La Esquina de Tejas. Attended a Cuban Independence Day celebration at the Dade County Auditorium.
New Jersey	South Orange	May 21	Gave the commencement address at Seton Hall University.
Virginia	Williamsburg	May 27–31	Hosted the 9th G7 summit at Colonial Williamsburg. Venues for the summit included Carter's Grove Plantation and the Abby Aldrich Rockefeller Folk Art Museum.

== June ==
State or country	Areas visited	Dates	Details
Minnesota	Hopkins, Minneapolis	June 9	Took questions at a National Commission on Excellence in Education regional forum at Hopkins-Eisenhower Community Center. Raised funds for Senator Rudy Boschwitz at the Leamington Hotel in Minneapolis.
Tennessee	Farragut	June 14	Took questions at a National Commission on Excellence in Education regional forum at Farragut High School.
New Mexico	Albuquerque	June 14–15	Stayed at the Albuquerque Hilton. Addressed the National Parent Teacher Association convention at the Kiva Auditorium.
Mississippi	Jackson	June 20	Attended a Mississippi Republican Party "Salute to Trent Lott" fundraiser at Dennery's Restaurant.
Illinois	Chicago	June 23	Spoke at the Polish National Alliance Hall. Addressed the American Medical Association House of Delegates at the Chicago Marriott Downtown.
Kentucky	Louisville	June 29	Addressed the Vocational Industrial Clubs of America National Leadership Conference at the Kentucky Fair and Exposition Center.
Kansas	Shawnee Mission	June 29	Addressed the National Association of Student Councils conference at Shawnee Mission Northwest High School.
California	Beverly Hills, Whittier, Long Beach	June 29–30	Stayed at the Beverly Wilshire Hotel. Took questions at a National Commission on Excellence in Education regional forum at Pioneer High School. Attended a California Republican Party fundraiser at the Spruce Goose Dome.

== July ==
State or country	Areas visited	Dates	Details
California	Los Angeles	July 5	Addressed the American Federation of Teachers convention at the Westin Bonaventure Hotel.
Florida	Hollywood	July 18	Addressed the International Longshoremen's Association convention at the Diplomat Resort.

== August ==
State or country	Areas visited	Dates	Details
Georgia	Atlanta	August 1	Addressed the American Bar Association convention at the Atlanta Civic Center.
Florida	Tampa	August 12	Addressed the United States Hispanic Chamber of Commerce convention at the Hyatt Regency Tampa.
Texas	El Paso	August 12–14	Stayed at the Marriott Hotel. Addressed the American GI Forum convention at the El Paso Civic Center.
Mexico	La Paz	August 14	Informal meeting with President Miguel de la Madrid.
Louisiana	New Orleans	August 14–15	Stayed at the Hilton New Orleans Riverside. Addressed the Veterans of Foreign Wars convention at the Rivergate Convention Center.
California	Los Angeles	August 21–23	Stayed at the Century Plaza Hotel. Had a hearing aid installed by an otolaryngologist in Westlake.
Washington	Seattle	August 23	Addressed the American Legion convention at the Seattle Center.
California	Los Angeles, San Diego, Santa Barbara	August 23–26	Stayed at the Century Plaza Hotel. Addressed the Hispanic Economic Outlook Preview luncheon at The Biltmore Los Angeles. Addressed the Republican Women's Leadership Forum at the Bahia Hotel in San Diego. Raised funds for Representative Robert Lagomarsino at Hope Ranch.

== September ==
State or country	Areas visited	Dates	Details
South Carolina	Columbia	September 20	Gave a convocation speech at the University of South Carolina. Raised funds for Senator Strom Thurmond at the South Carolina State Fairgrounds.
New York	New York	September 25–26	Addressed the opening session of the 38th United Nations General Assembly. Stayed at the Waldorf Astoria.

== October ==
State or country	Areas visited	Dates	Details
Kentucky	Louisville	October 7	Addressed the National Federation of Republican Women convention at the Commonwealth Convention Center. Campaigned for Jim Bunning in the 1983 Kentucky gubernatorial election at the Galt House Hotel.
Maryland	Baltimore	October 11	Attended the first game of the 1983 World Series at Baltimore Memorial Stadium.
Georgia	Augusta	October 21–23	Played golf at the Augusta National Golf Club, staying overnight at the Eisenhower Cabin. Reagan's golf game was interrupted when Charles Harris took two White House staffers and four club employees hostage in the Pro Shop.

== November ==
State or country	Areas visited	Dates	Details
North Carolina	Jacksonville	November 4	Met with family members of soldiers killed in the United States invasion of Grenada and the 1983 Beirut barracks bombings at Marine Corps Base Camp Lejeune.
Alaska	Anchorage	November 8	Stopover at Elmendorf Air Force Base on the way to Japan.
Japan	Tokyo	November 9–12	State visit. Met with Emperor Hirohito and Prime Minister Yasuhiro Nakasone and addressed the Diet.
South Korea	Seoul, Demilitarized Zone	November 12–14	State visit. Met with President Chun Doo-hwan. Addressed the National Assembly and visited U.S. troops.

== December ==
State or country	Areas visited	Dates	Details
Indiana	Indianapolis	December 8	Addressed the National Forum on Excellence in Education at the Indianapolis Convention Center.
New York	New York	December 12	Addressed the Congressional Medal of Honor Society convention at the Sheraton Centre Hotel & Towers.
California	Los Angeles, Palm Springs	December 27–31	Stayed at the Century Plaza Hotel and Sunnylands.
