= Fourth session of the United Nations General Assembly =

- 20 September 1949 – 30 June 1950 4th session 4th general debate
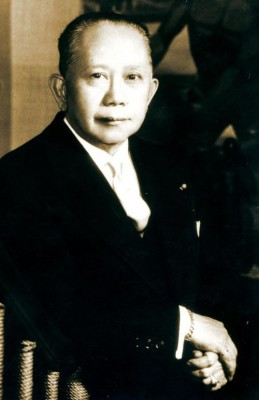
- President of the 4th General Assembly, Carlos P. Romulo
- Host country: United Nations
- Participants: United Nations Member States
- President: Carlos P. Romulo
- Secretary-General: Trygve Lie

The fourth session of the United Nations General Assembly opened on 20 September 1949 and ended 30 June 1950 at the Methodist Central Hall in London. The president was Carlos P. Romulo

== See also ==
- List of UN General Assembly sessions
- List of General debates of the United Nations General Assembly
