= Fifty-ninth session of the United Nations General Assembly =

- 14 September 2004 – 12 September 2005
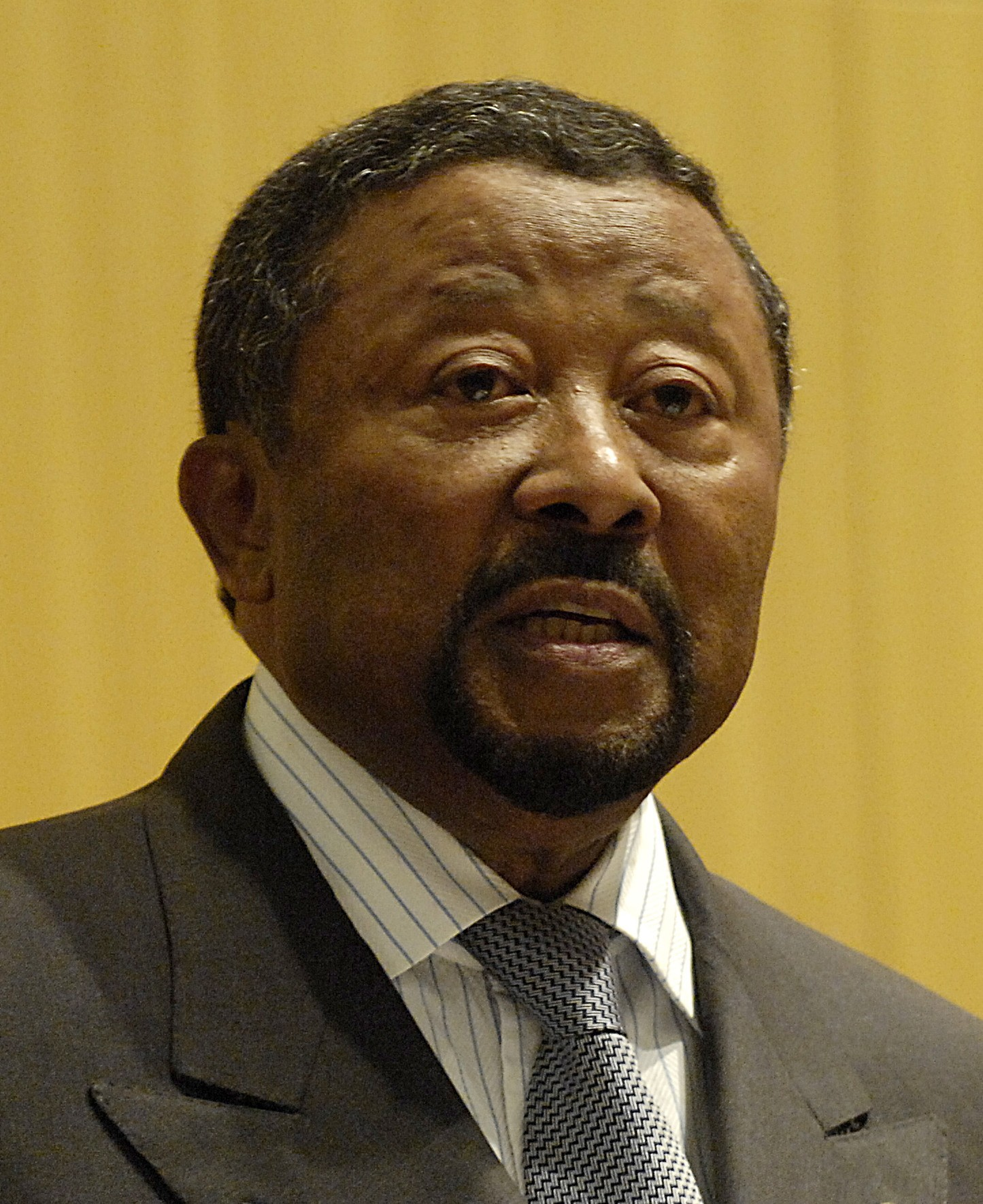
- President of the 59th General Assembly, Jean Ping
- Host country: United Nations
- Participants: United Nations Member States
- President: Jean Ping
- Secretary-General: Kofi Annan

The fifty-ninth session of the United Nations General Assembly was the session of the United Nations General Assembly that ran from 14 September 2004 to 12 September 2005. The president of the General Assembly was from the Africa Group.

== Organisation for the session ==
The president was Jean Ping, former Minister for Foreign Affairs of Gabon and later Presidential candidate.

== See also ==
- List of UN General Assembly sessions
- List of General debates of the United Nations General Assembly
