= Fifty-third session of the United Nations General Assembly =

- 15 September 1998 – 20 September 1999 53rd session 53rd general debate
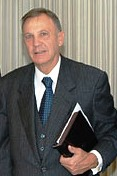
- President of the 53th General Assembly, Didier Opertti
- Host country: United Nations
- Participants: United Nations Member States
- President: Didier Opertti
- Secretary-General: Kofi Annan

The Fifty-third session of the United Nations General Assembly opened on 15 September 1998. The president of the General Assembly was Didier Opertti.

== See also ==
- List of UN General Assembly sessions
- List of General debates of the United Nations General Assembly
