= Fifty-fourth session of the United Nations General Assembly =

- 14 September 1999 – 4 September 2000 54th session 54th general debate
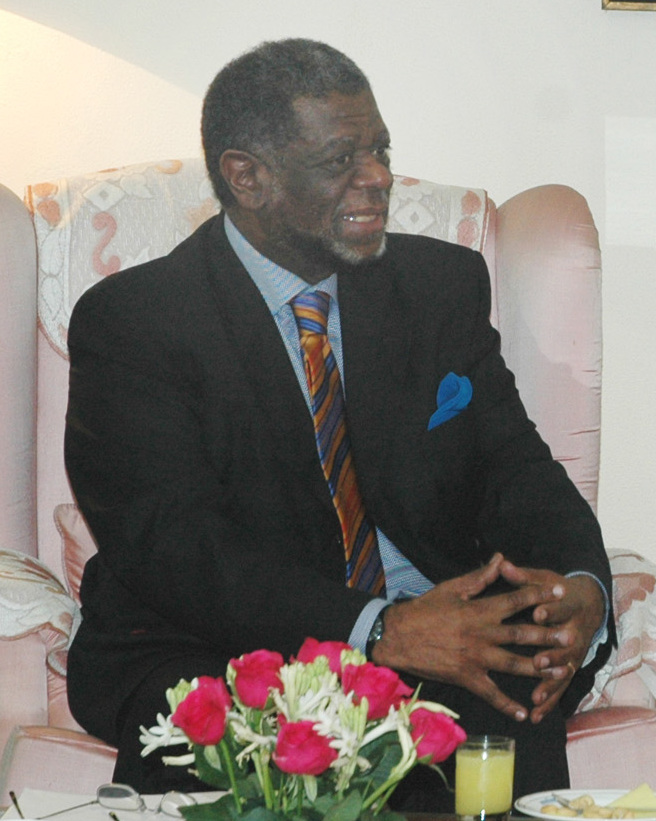
- President of the 54th General Assembly, Theo-Ben Gurirab
- Host country: United Nations
- Participants: United Nations Member States
- President: Theo-Ben Gurirab
- Secretary-General: Kofi Annan

The fifty-fourth session of the United Nations General Assembly opened on 14 September 1999 at the UN Headquarters in New York. The president was Theo-Ben Gurirab, the former Minister of Foreign Affairs of Namibia.

== See also ==
- List of UN General Assembly sessions
- List of General debates of the United Nations General Assembly
