= Forty-second session of the United Nations General Assembly =

- 15 September 1987 – 19 September 1988 42nd session 42nd general debate
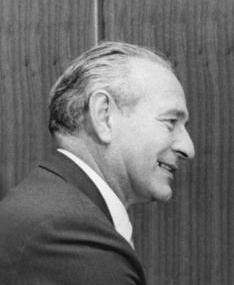
- President of the 42nd General Assembly, Peter Florin
- Host country: United Nations
- Participants: United Nations Member States
- President: Peter Florin
- Secretary-General: Javier Pérez de Cuéllar

The forty-second session of the United Nations General Assembly opened on 15 September 1987 at the UN Headquarters in New York. The president was Peter Florin, previous Ambassador to the United Nations of the German Democratic Republic. During his presidency of the United Nations General Assembly, he was, according to the New York Times, "nicknamed 'Comrade Glasnost' by delegates, who s[aw] him as him a symbol of the modern Communist of the Gorbachev era.

== See also ==
- Outline of the United Nations
- List of UN General Assembly sessions
- List of General debates of the United Nations General Assembly
