= Fifty-sixth session of the United Nations General Assembly =

- 12 September 2001 – 9 September 2002 56th session 56th general debate
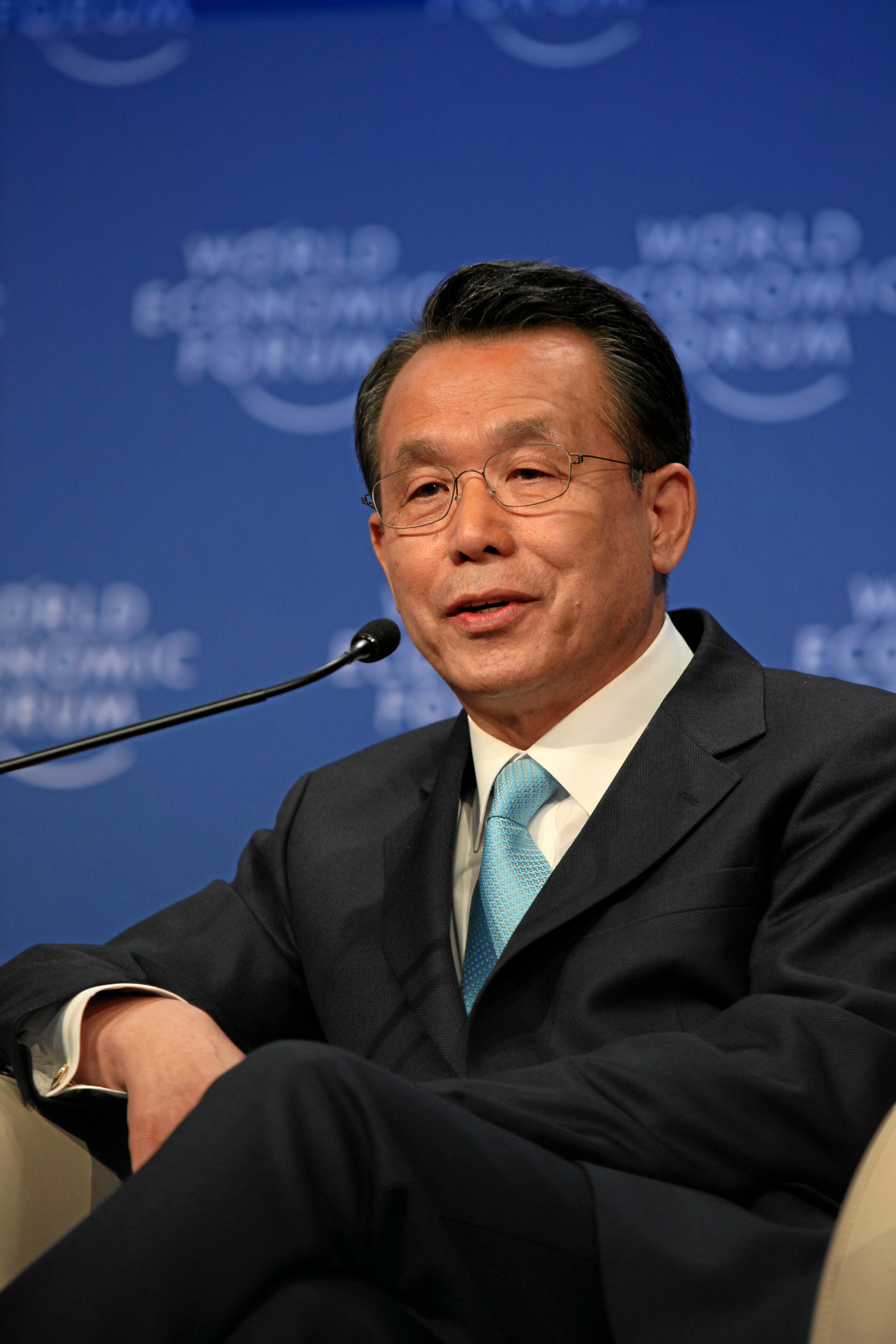
- President of the 56th General Assembly, Han Seung-soo
- Host country: United Nations
- Participants: United Nations Member States
- President: Han Seung-soo
- Secretary-General: Kofi Annan

The fifty-sixth session of the United Nations General Assembly opened on 12 September 2001 at the UN Headquarters in New York City. The president was former Minister of Foreign Affairs of South Korea Han Seung-soo.

The session opened the day after the September 11 attacks which destroyed the nearby World Trade Center.

== See also ==
- List of UN General Assembly sessions
- List of General debates of the United Nations General Assembly
