= Thirty-sixth session of the United Nations General Assembly =

- 15 September 1981 – 20 September 1982 36th session 36th general debate
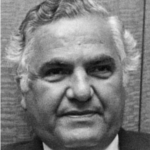
- Host country: United Nations
- Participants: United Nations Member States
- President: Ismat T. Kittani
- Secretary-General: Kurt Waldheim

The thirty-sixth session of the United Nations General Assembly opened on 15 September 1981. Its last session was held on 20 September 1982. The president was Iraqi politician Ismat T. Kittani.

== Resolutions ==
- United Nations General Assembly Resolution 36/3
  - Adopted 25 September 1981 to admit Belize to membership. 144 member nations voted to support, with Guatemala opposing. Democratic Kampuchea, Dominica, Gabon, Gambia, Haiti, Nigeria, Rwanda, Saudi Arabia, South Africa, and Zaire did not vote.
- Declaration on the Inadmissibility of Intervention and Interference in the Internal Affairs of States (A/RES/36/103)
  - Adopted 9 December 1981.

== See also ==
- List of UN General Assembly sessions
