= Permanent Representative of Hungary to the United Nations (New York) =

Representative of Hungary to the UN

- Magyarország állandó képviselője az Egyesült Nemzetek Szervezetéhez
- Flag of the United Nations
- Incumbent; Zsuzsanna Horváth since 16 February 2021
- Hungarian Ministry of Foreign Affairs
- Style: Her Excellency
- Appointer: President of Hungary
- Formation: 1955
- Website: https://un-newyork.mfa.gov.hu/en

The Permanent Representative of Hungary to the United Nations is the chief of mission of the Hungarian delegation to the United Nations at its headquarters in New York City. The Permanent Representative represents Hungary in plenary meetings of the United Nations General Assembly, and advances Hungary's policy positions within the organization.

As of 2026, the office is held by Zsuzsanna Horváth, who presented her credentials to the UN Secretariat on 16 February 2021.

== List of Permanent Representatives ==
The following is a chronological list of persons who have served as Permanent Representative of Hungary to the United Nations at New York City:

#	Representative	Years served
1	Imre Hollai	1974–1980
2	Ferenc Esztergályos	1986–1990
3	André Erdős	1990–1994
4	Csaba Kőrösi	2010–2014
5	Katalin Bogyay	2015–2020
6	Zsuzsanna Horváth	2021–present

== See also ==
- Outline of the United Nations
- List of current permanent representatives to the United Nations
