= Forty-third session of the United Nations General Assembly =

- 20 September 1988 – 18 September 1989 43rd session 43rd general debate
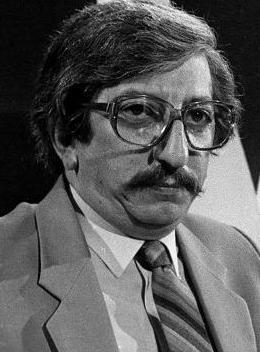
- President of the 43th General Assembly, Dante Caputo
- Host country: United Nations
- Participants: United Nations Member States
- President: Dante Caputo
- Secretary-General: Javier Pérez de Cuéllar

The Forty-third session of the United Nations General Assembly opened on 20 September 1988. The president of the General Assembly was Dante Caputo.

== See also ==
- List of UN General Assembly sessions
- List of General debates of the United Nations General Assembly
