= Fifty-second session of the United Nations General Assembly =

- 16 September 1997 – 14 September 1998 52nd session 52nd general debate
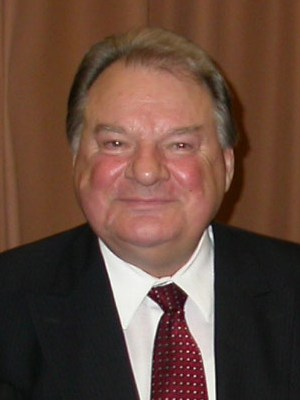
- President of the 52th General Assembly, Hennadiy Udovenko
- Host country: United Nations
- Participants: United Nations Member States
- President: Hennadiy Udovenko
- Secretary-General: Kofi Annan

The Fifty-second session of the United Nations General Assembly opened on 16 September 1997. The president of the General Assembly was Hennadiy Udovenko.

== See also ==
- List of UN General Assembly sessions
- List of General debates of the United Nations General Assembly
