= Sixtieth session of the United Nations General Assembly =

- 13 September 2005 – 11 September 2006 60th session 60th general debate
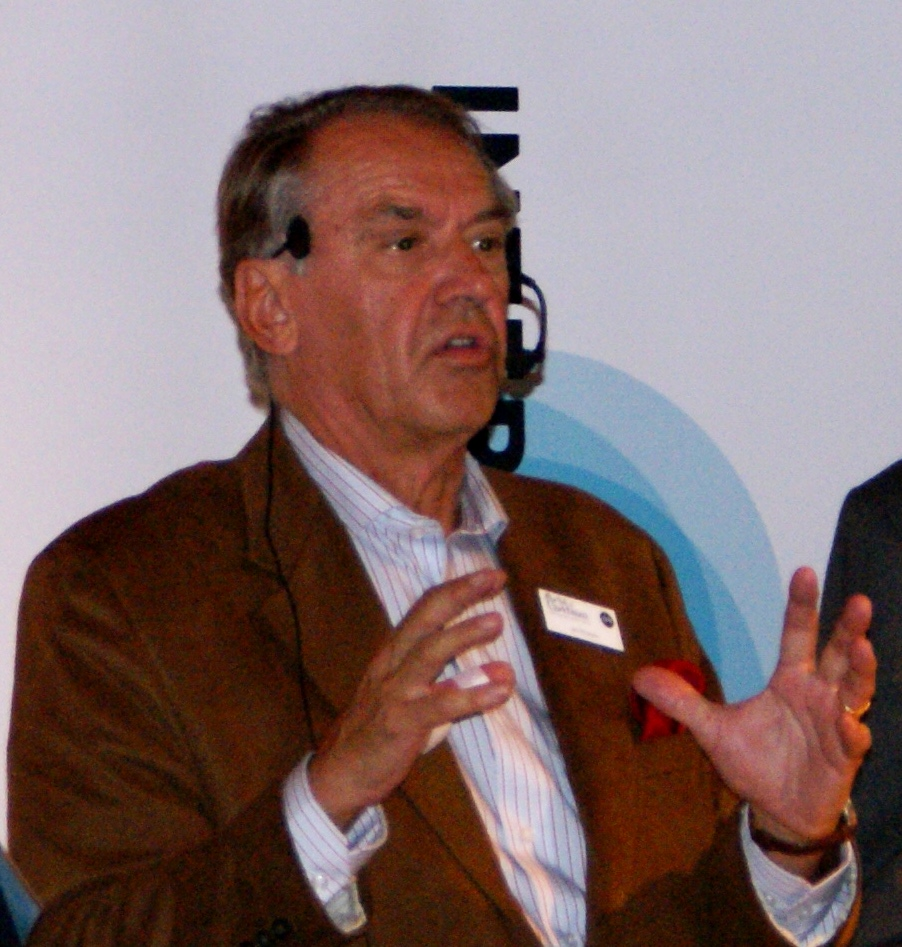
- President of the 60th General Assembly, Jan Eliasson
- Host country: United Nations
- Participants: United Nations Member States
- President: Jan Eliasson
- Secretary-General: Kofi Annan

The sixtieth session of the United Nations General Assembly opened on 13 September 2005 at the UN Headquarters in New York. The president was Jan Eliasson, former Minister for Foreign Affairs and Sweden's Ambassador to the United States.

== See also ==
- List of UN General Assembly sessions
- List of General debates of the United Nations General Assembly
