= Fiftieth session of the United Nations General Assembly =

- 19 September 1995 – 16 September 1996 50th session 50th general debate
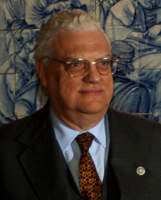
- President of the 50th General Assembly, Diogo Freitas do Amaral
- Host country: United Nations
- Participants: United Nations Member States
- President: Diogo Freitas do Amaral
- Secretary-General: Boutros Boutros-Ghali

The Fiftieth session of the United Nations General Assembly opened on 19 September 1995. The president of the General Assembly was Diogo Freitas do Amaral.

== General Debate ==
The General Debate of the fiftieth session of the United Nations General Assembly commenced on 19 September 1995 and ended on 3 October 1995.

== See also ==
- List of UN General Assembly sessions
- List of General debates of the United Nations General Assembly
