= Forty-ninth session of the United Nations General Assembly =

- 20 September 1994 – 18 September 1995 49th session 49th general debate
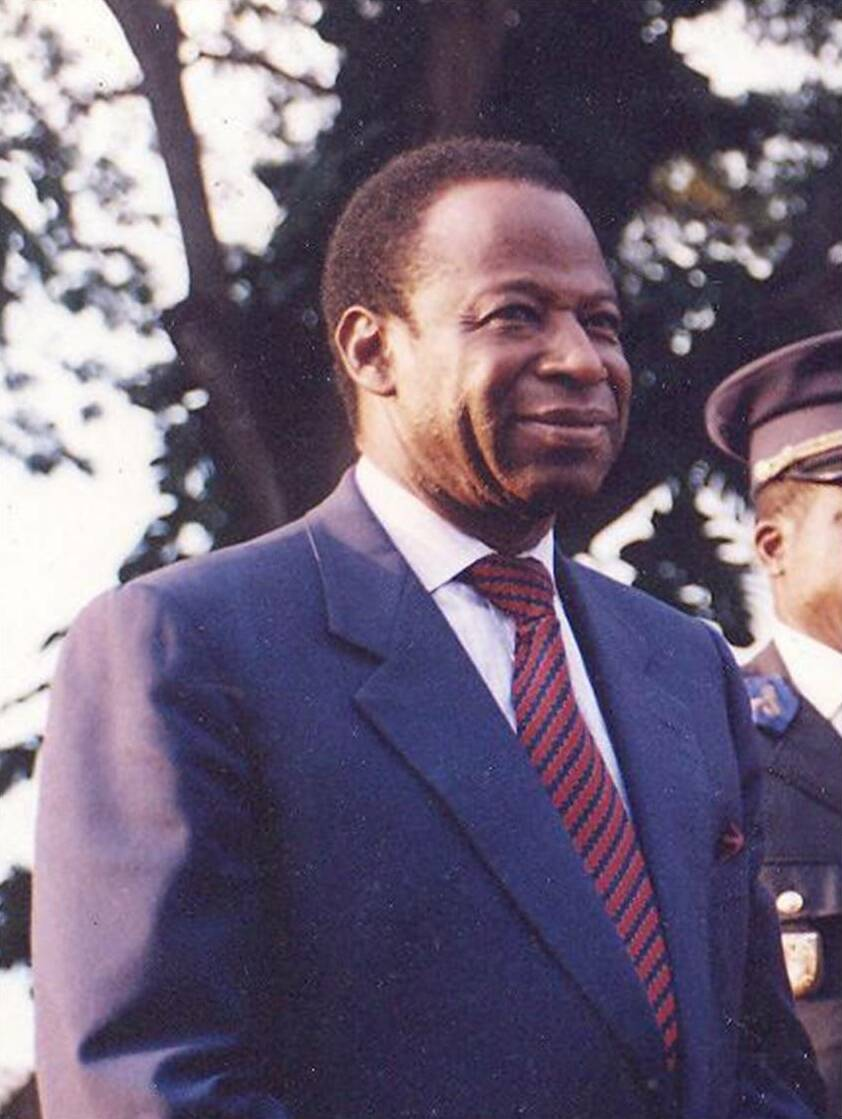
- President of the 49th General Assembly, Amara Essy
- Host country: United Nations
- Participants: United Nations Member States
- President: Amara Essy
- Secretary-General: Boutros Boutros-Ghali

The Forty-ninth session of the United Nations General Assembly opened on 20 September 1994. The president of the General Assembly was Amara Essy.

== See also ==
- List of UN General Assembly sessions
- List of General debates of the United Nations General Assembly
