= Sixty-first session of the United Nations General Assembly =

- 12 September 2006 – 17 September 2007 61st session 61st general debate
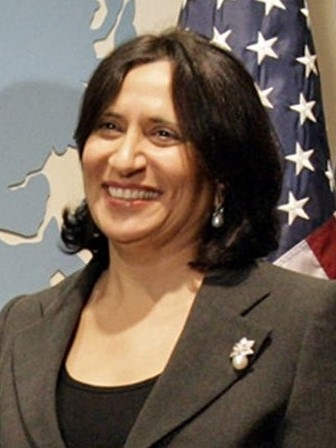
- President of the 61st General Assembly, Haya Rashed Al Khalifa
- Host country: United Nations
- Participants: United Nations Member States
- President: Haya Rashed Al Khalifa
- Secretary-General: Kofi Annan

The sixty-first session of the United Nations General Assembly opened on 12 September 2006 at the UN Headquarters in New York. The president was Haya Rashed Al Khalifa, Legal Adviser to the Royal Court of Bahrain. She was only the third woman to serve as President of the General Assembly, and the first since the twenty-fourth session in 1969.

The theme of the 61st session was "Implementing a global partnership for development".

It was at its sixty-first session that the United Nations General Assembly adopted the Convention on the Rights of Persons with Disabilities.

== See also ==
- List of UN General Assembly sessions
- List of General debates of the United Nations General Assembly
