= Thirty-ninth session of the United Nations General Assembly =

- 18 September 1984 – 16 September 1985 39th session 39th general debate
- Host country: United Nations
- Participants: United Nations Member States
- President: Paul J. F. Lusaka
- Secretary-General: Javier Pérez de Cuéllar

The thirty-ninth session of the United Nations General Assembly opened on 18 September 1984 at the UN Headquarters in New York. The president was Paul J. F. Lusaka, Permanent Representative of Zambia to the United Nations.

== See also ==
- List of UN General Assembly sessions
