= Forty-fourth session of the United Nations General Assembly =

- 19 September 1989 – 17 September 1990 44th session 44th general debate
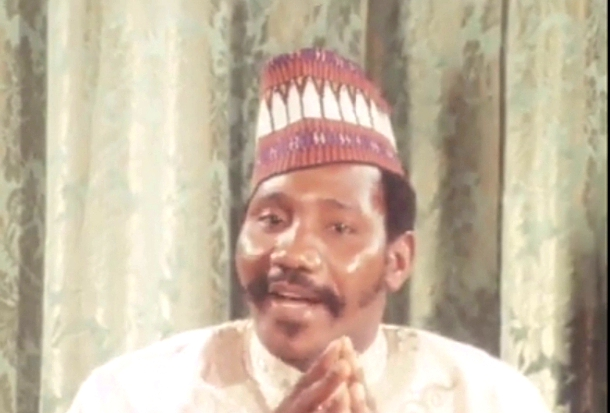
- President of the 44th General Assembly, Joseph Nanven Garba
- Host country: United Nations
- Participants: United Nations Member States
- President: Joseph Nanven Garba
- Secretary-General: Javier Pérez de Cuéllar

The Forty-fourth session of the United Nations General Assembly opened on 19 September 1989. The president of the General Assembly was Joseph Nanven Garba.

== See also ==
- List of UN General Assembly sessions
- List of General debates of the United Nations General Assembly
