= Fifty-first session of the United Nations General Assembly =

- 17 September 1996 – 15 September 1997 51st session 51st general debate
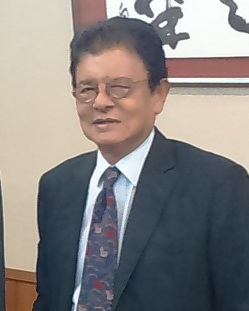
- President of the 51th General Assembly, Razali Ismail
- Host country: United Nations
- Participants: United Nations Member States
- President: Razali Ismail
- Secretary-General: Boutros Boutros-Ghali

The Fifty-first session of the United Nations General Assembly opened on 17 September 1996. The president of the General Assembly was Razali Ismail.

== See also ==
- List of UN General Assembly sessions
- List of General debates of the United Nations General Assembly
