= Forty-eighth session of the United Nations General Assembly =

- 21 September 1993 – 19 September 1994 48th session 48th general debate
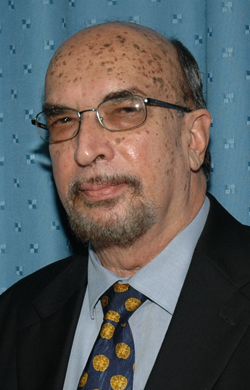
- President of the 48th General Assembly, Samuel Insanally
- Host country: United Nations
- Participants: United Nations Member States
- President: Samuel Insanally
- Secretary-General: Boutros Boutros-Ghali

The Forty-eighth session of the United Nations General Assembly opened on 21 September 1993. The president of the General Assembly was Samuel Insanally.

== See also ==
- List of UN General Assembly sessions
- List of General debates of the United Nations General Assembly
