= Forty-fifth session of the United Nations General Assembly =

- 18 September 1990 – 16 September 1991 45th session 45th general debate
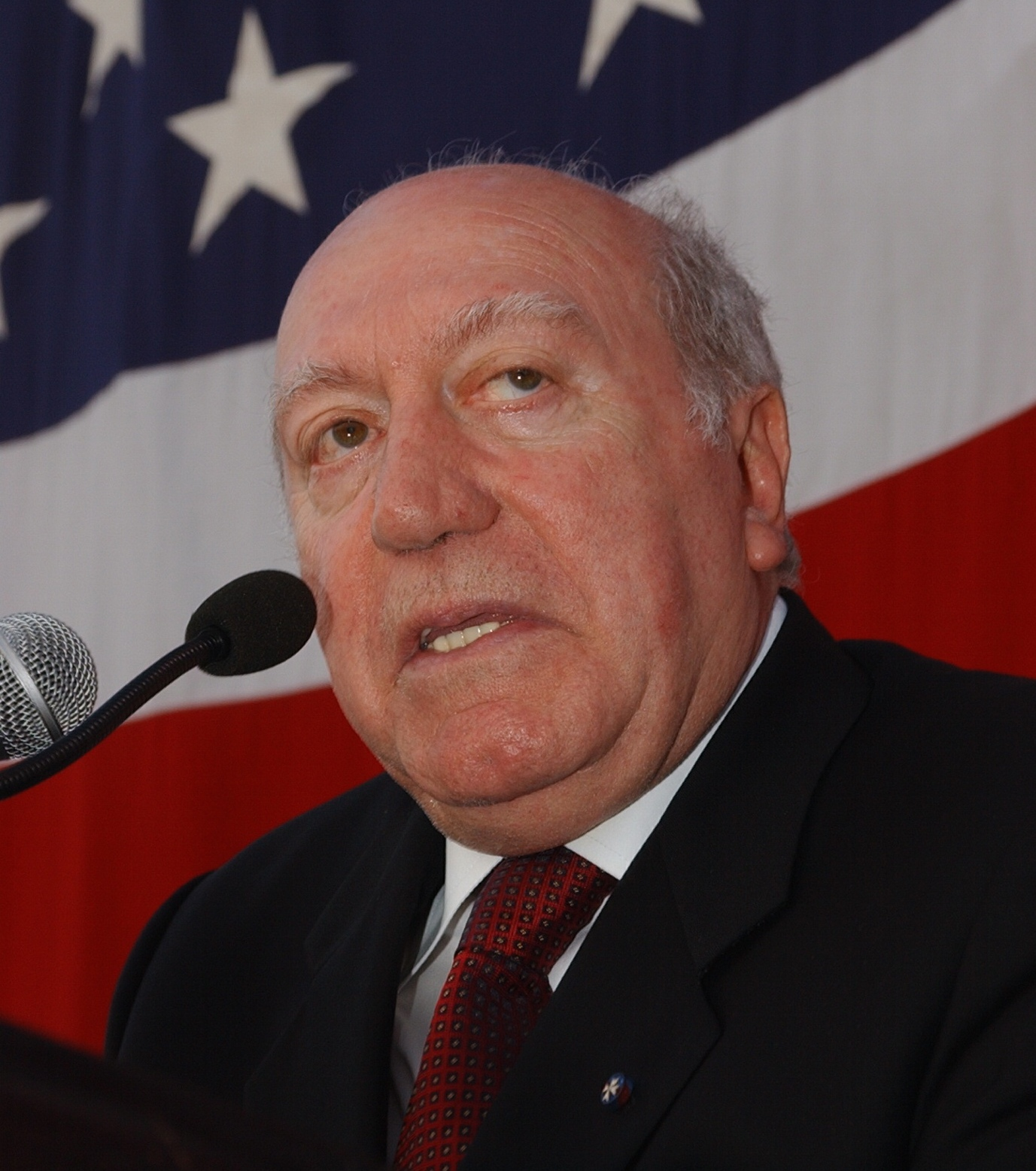
- President of the 45th General Assembly, Guido de Marco
- Host country: United Nations
- Participants: United Nations Member States
- President: Guido de Marco
- Secretary-General: Javier Pérez de Cuéllar

The Forty-fifth session of the United Nations General Assembly opened on 18 September 1990. The president of the General Assembly was Guido de Marco.

== See also ==
- List of UN General Assembly sessions
- List of General debates of the United Nations General Assembly
