= Thirty-eighth session of the United Nations General Assembly =

- 20 September 1983 – 17 September 1984 38th session 38th general debate
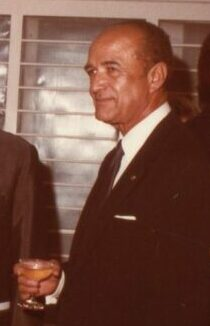
- President of the 38th General Assembly, Jorge Illueca
- Host country: United Nations
- Participants: United Nations Member States
- President: Jorge Illueca
- Secretary-General: Javier Pérez de Cuéllar

The thirty-eighth session of the United Nations General Assembly opened on 20 September 1983 at the UN Headquarters in New York. The president was Jorge Illueca, Vice President of Panama and former Minister of Foreign Affairs of Panama. He would go on to briefly serve as President of Panama in 1984.

Saint Kitts and Nevis was admitted and received membership in the United Nations

== See also ==
- List of UN General Assembly sessions
