= Carlos Sosa Rodríguez =

Venezuelan jurist and diplomat

President of the United Nations General Assembly
- In office 1963–1964
- Preceded by: Muhammad Zafarullah Khan
- Succeeded by: Alex Quaison-Sackey

Ambassador of Venezuela to the United Kingdom
- In office 1950–1952

Personal details
- Born: 30 April 1912 Caracas, Venezuela
- Died: 10 July 1997 (aged 85)

Carlos Sosa Rodríguez (30 April 1912 – 10 July 1997) was a Venezuelan jurist and diplomat. He served as President of the United Nations General Assembly from 1963 to 1964.

After studying law, he obtained a doctorate in law from the University of Paris and the Central University of Venezuela. He wrote a book on international maritime law, 'International River Law and the Rivers of Latin America', published in Paris in 1935 by Éditions A. Pedone.
