= Emilio Arenales Catalán =

Guatemalan politician

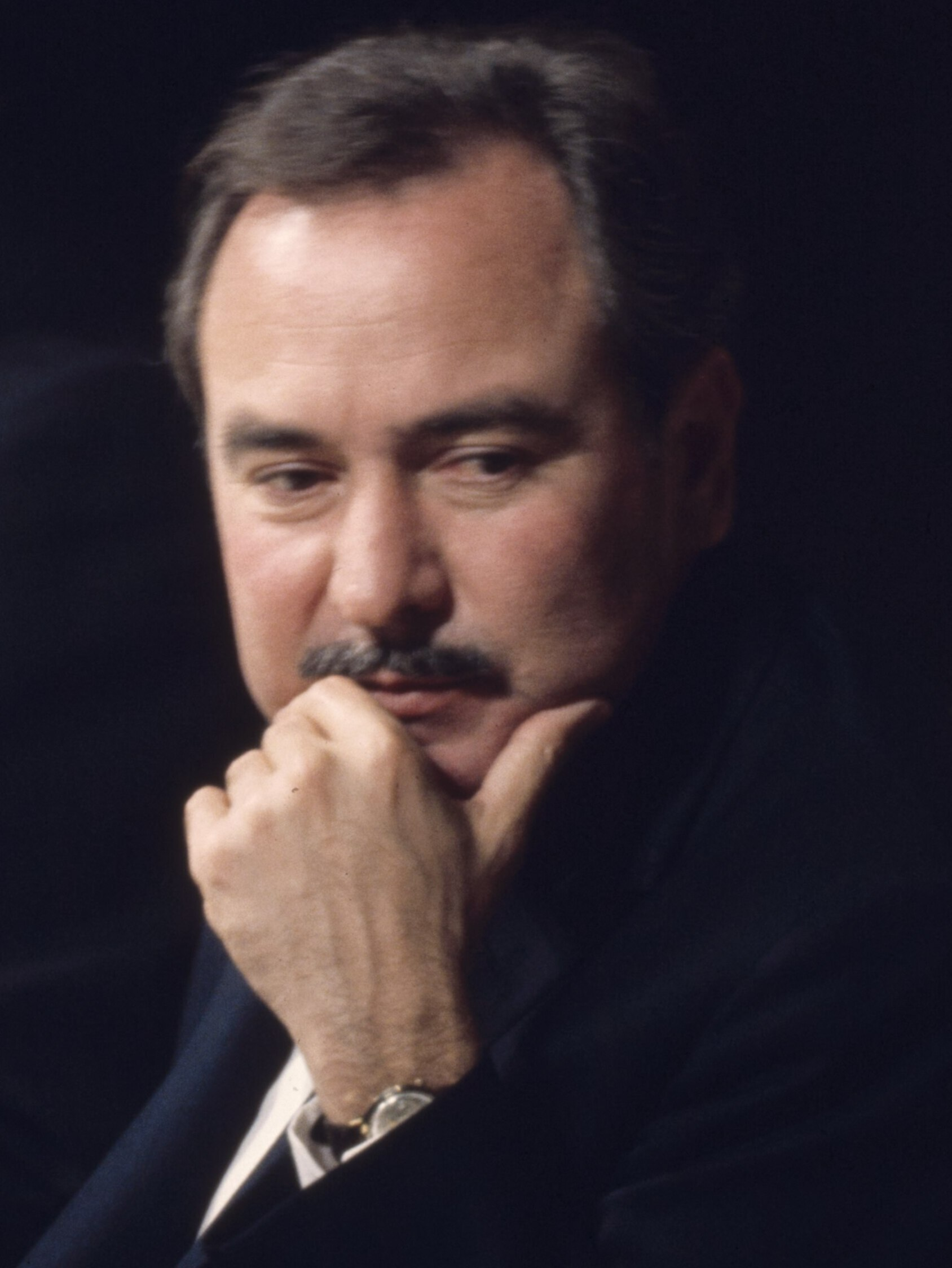
Image of Emilio Arenales Catalán

Emilio Arenales Catalán (May 10, 1922 – April 17, 1969) was the foreign minister of Guatemala from 1966 to 1969 and the president of the United Nations Twenty-Third General Assembly from 1968 to 1969. He was born in and died in Guatemala City.

== Biography ==
Arenales was born on May 10, 1922 in Guatemala City. He held the degrees of Bachelor of Science and Letters from the Instituto Modelo in Guatemala City (1932–1949) and Juridical Science from the Universidad de San Carlos de Guatemala (1940–1945).

In 1946, he joined UNESCO, which he remained with until 1948, when he went back to Guatemala to finish studying law. After the Guatemalan government was overthrown in 1954, he rejoined the UN.

In 1955, he was appointed the Guatemala Ambassador to the United Nations. He held the position until 1958, when he joined a private law practice.

In 1966, he was appointed the Foreign Minister of Guatamala, which he served until 1968, when he was elected the president of the UN General Assembly.

Arenales was married in 1946 to the former Lucy Dorion Cabarrus who he had four children with.

Arenalas died on April 17, 1969, age 46, of brain cancer.

== Achievements at the United Nations ==
The following list details Catalán's major achievements during his time with the U.N.

1946: Founder and Head of Division of Relations of the United Nations and its specialized agencies.

1946-1949: Deputy Head of Section of External Relations and External Relations Counselor for UNESCO.

1947: UNESCO Deputy Head of Mission to Latin America, together with Sir Julian Huxley and Professor Samuel Ramos. The mission intended to visit each Latin American country and invite them to participate in the first UNESCO General Conference.

1947: Secretary Assistant to the External Relations Commission and Administrative Affairs at the I UNESCO General Conference, Mexico.

1948: Proposed the plan to organize the National Commissions of the member countries, based on the experience of the League of Nations and the International Institute of Intellectual Cooperation. When the plan was accepted, he was named Emissary to UNESCO, and visited a number of Latin American countries, promoting the creation and/or reorganization of National Commissions.

1948: UNESCO representative before the IX Pan-American Conference, Bogotá, Colombia.

1948: UNESCO Head of Latin American Mission.

1948: Secretary-General of the UNESCO International Conference of the Hylean Amazon, which met in Lima, Peru and Manaus, Brazil, having previously visited the participating governments in order to ensure their support and cooperation.

1948: UNESCO General Secretary at the Regional Conference on Scientific Cooperation, Montevideo, Uruguay.

1948: Secretary of External Relations Commission and Administrative Affairs at the II UNESCO General Assembly, Beirut, Lebanon.

1954-1955: Attended the ninth and tenth United Nations General Assembly as part of the Colonial Affairs commission.

1955-1958: Ambassador and Permanent Representative of Guatemala to the United Nations.

1955: Vice-President of the United Nations Committee on Non-Self-Governing Territories.

1955: Guatemalan United Nations representative at the Special Session of the General Assembly, to commemorate its 10th anniversary, San Francisco, United States.

1955: Chief of the Guatemalan Delegation before the X United Nations General Assembly, Commission of Private Affairs.

1956: Chief of the Guatemalan Delegation before the XI United Nations General Assembly; elected Chairman of the Commission for Political Affairs.

1956: President of the United Nations Committee on Non-Self-Governing Territories. (See United Nations list of non-self-governing territories.)

1957: Elected Chairman of the Political Affairs Commission and President of the Special Political Commission at the XII session of the United Nations General Assembly.

1957: Vice-President of the United Nations Trusteeship Council.

1958: President of the United Nations Trusteeship Council and President of the Group of Latin American Ambassadors before the United Nations.

1968: President of the United Nations Twenty-Third General Assembly from 1968 to 1969.

Diplomatic posts
Preceded by Corneliu Mănescu	President of the United Nations General Assembly; 1968–1969	Succeeded by Angie Elisabeth Brooks
