= Didier Opertti =

Uruguayan political figure and lawyer (born 1937)

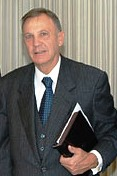
Opertti in 2005

Didier Opertti Badán (born 23 April 1937) is a Uruguayan political figure and lawyer.

== Political offices in Uruguay ==
=== Interior Minister ===
Opertti served as the interior minister of Uruguay from 1995 to 1998 in the government of Julio María Sanguinetti.

=== Foreign minister ===
Opertti subsequently served as Minister of Foreign Relations under both Presidents Sanguinetti and subsequently Jorge Batlle from 1998 until 1 March 2005.

== Other offices ==
He served as the president of the United Nations General Assembly from 1998 to 1999.

As of 2006, he serves as Secretary-General of ALADI.

== See also ==
- Politics of Uruguay

Diplomatic posts
Preceded by Hennadiy Udovenko	President of the United Nations General Assembly; 1998–1999	Succeeded by Theo-Ben Gurirab
