= Jaime de Piniés =

Spanish diplomat

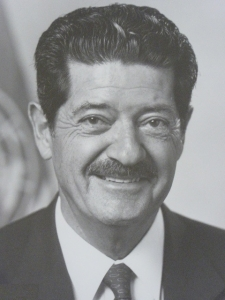

President of the United Nations General Assembly
- In office 1985–1986
- Preceded by: Paul J. F. Lusaka
- Succeeded by: Humayun Rashid Choudhury

Personal details
- Born: 18 November 1917 Madrid, Spain
- Died: 29 December 2003 (aged 86)

Jaime de Piniés (18 November 1917 – 29 December 2003) was a Spanish diplomat who served as President of the United Nations General Assembly. Before he held that position he served as Permanent Representative of Spain to the United Nations for approximately fourteen non-consecutive years. The first time being from September 1968 to May 1972 and the second lasted from September 1973 until June 1985. He had a law degree from the University of Madrid.

Diplomatic posts
Preceded by Paul J. F. Lusaka	President of the United Nations General Assembly; 1985–1986	Succeeded by Humayun Rashid Choudhury
