= Imre Hollai =

Hungarian diplomat and politician

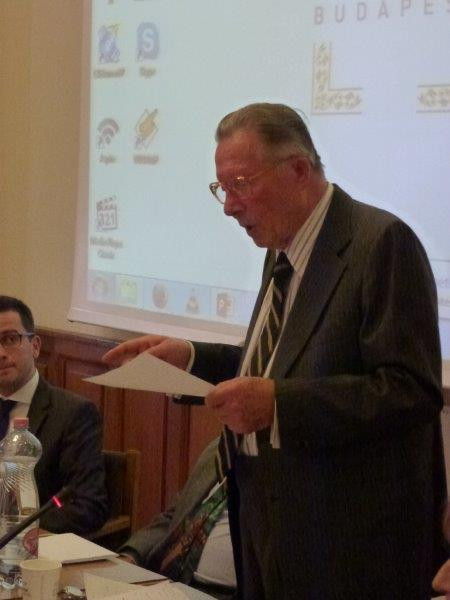

President of the United Nations General Assembly
- In office 1982–1983
- Preceded by: Ismat T. Kittani
- Succeeded by: Jorge Illueca

Personal details
- Born: 22 January 1925 Újpest, Hungary
- Died: 22 November 2017 (aged 92) Budapest, Hungary
- Party: MKP (1945–1948); MDP (1948–1956); MSZMP (1956–1989)
- Spouse: Margit Fejes (m. 1949)

Imre Hollai (Hungarian: Hollai Imre; 22 January 1925 – 22 November 2017) was a Hungarian diplomat and politician, who served as President of the United Nations General Assembly from 1982 to 1983, during its thirty-seventh session.

== Biography ==
Imre Hollai was born in Újpest (today a district of Budapest) on 22 January 1925 as the son of Béla Hollai and Emma Putz. He joined the Hungarian Communist Party (MKP) in 1945. A mechanist by profession, Hollai joined the Hungarian foreign service in 1949. He graduated from the Lenin Institute of the Eötvös Loránd University in 1952. Meanwhile, he served as political adviser then deputy head of the Department for International Relations of the Central Leadership of the Hungarian Working People's Party (MDP) from 1949 to 1955.

While also being a state security officer, Hollai functioned as Hungary's Deputy Representative to the United Nations from 1955 to 1960, residing in New York City. Returning home, he was head of foreign relations for the Central Committee of the Hungarian Socialist Workers' Party (MSZMP) from 1960 to 1963. Following that he served as Hungarian Ambassador to Greece and Cyprus from 1964 to 1970, and as Hungary's Deputy Foreign Minister from 1970–1974.

He served as Hungary's Ambassador to the United Nations from 1974 to 1980 and as Hungary's Deputy Foreign Minister again from 1980 until 1984. While in this position, he served as President of the United Nations General Assembly from 1982–83. Due to his great success in this role and popularity among his peers in international diplomatic circles due to his charismatic intelligence he was seen as a threat to the rigid communists in the Hungarian hierarchy and forced to return as ambassador to his earlier post in Greece and Cyprus in 1984.

He retired from the diplomatic service on 28 February 1989. However, he had been an active member of the Council of Presidents of the General Assembly, the body informally advising the Secretary-General of the United Nations. Hollai died on 22 November 2017, aged 92.

== Decorations and awards ==
- Golden Class of the Order of Merit of the Hungarian People's Republic (1951)
- Order of Labour (1955)
- Bronze Class of the Order of the Hungarian Freedom (1957)
- Commemorative Medal of Liberation (1970)
- Royal Order of George I (1973)
- Order of Labour, Golden Class (1975)
- Order "For Socialist Hungary" (1983)

== Works ==
- Hollai, Imre (2010). Út az elnökséghez [The Road To Presidency] (in Hungarian). Ad Librum Kiadó. ISBN 978-615-501-456-7.

== Sources ==
- Baráth, Magdolna; Gecsényi, Lajos, eds. (2015). Főkonzulok, követek és nagykövetek 1945–1990 [Consuls General, Envoys, Ambassadors 1945–1990] (in Hungarian). MTA Bölcsészettudományi Kutatóközpont. ISBN 978-963-416-007-6.

Diplomatic posts
Preceded by Vencel Házi	Hungarian Ambassador to Greece; 1964–1970	Succeeded by Béla Szilágyi
Preceded by Károly Szarka	Permanent Representative of Hungary to the United Nations; 1974–1980	Succeeded by Pál Rácz
Preceded by Ismat T. Kittani	President of the United Nations General Assembly; 1982–1983	Succeeded by Jorge Illueca
Preceded by István Dobos	Hungarian Ambassador to Greece; 1984–1988	Succeeded by László Kincses
