= List of general debates of the United Nations General Assembly =

The general debate of each new session of the General Assembly is held the week following the official opening of the session, typically the following Tuesday, and is held without interruption for nine working days. The general debate is a high-level event, typically attended by Member States' heads of state or government, government ministers and United Nations delegates. At the general debate, Member States are given the opportunity to raise attention to topics or issues that they feel are important. In addition to the general debate, there are also many other high-level thematic meetings, summits and informal events held during general debate week.

== General debates ==
The general debates are:

#	Session	Year	President of the General Assembly	Country	Secretary-General	Opening Date	Closing Date
1	1st	1946	Paul-Henri Spaak	Belgium	Trygve Lie	23 October 1946	14 November 1946
2	2nd	1947	Oswaldo Aranha	Brazil	Trygve Lie	16 September 1947	22 November 1947
3	3rd	1948	Herbert Vere Evatt	Australia	Trygve Lie	21 September 1948	12 December 1948
4	4th	1949	Carlos P. Romulo	Philippines	Trygve Lie	20 September 1949	10 December 1949
5	5th	1950	Nasrollah Entezam	Iran	Trygve Lie	19 September 1950	15 December 1950
6	6th	1951–52	Luis Padilla Nervo	Mexico	Trygve Lie	6 November 1951 (Note: The 6th session opened on 6 November 1951, unusually late, because the 5th session (1950–51) had been substantially prolonged by the Korean War.)	5 February 1952
7	7th	1952	Lester B. Pearson	Canada	Trygve Lie	14 October 1952	22 December 1952
8	8th	1953	Vijaya Lakshmi Pandit	India	Dag Hammarskjöld	15 September 1953	9 December 1953
9	9th	1954	Eelco van Kleffens	Netherlands	Dag Hammarskjöld	21 September 1954	17 December 1954
10	10th	1955	José Maza	Chile	Dag Hammarskjöld	20 September 1955	9 December 1955
11	11th	1956–57	Prince Wan Waithayakon	Thailand	Dag Hammarskjöld	12 November 1956 (Note: The 11th session opened on 12 November 1956, delayed by the convening of the First and Second Emergency Special Sessions concerning the Suez Crisis and the Hungarian Revolution of 1956, respectively.)	8 March 1957
12	12th	1957	Sir Leslie Munro	New Zealand	Dag Hammarskjöld	17 September 1957	14 December 1957
13	13th	1958	Charles Malik	Lebanon	Dag Hammarskjöld	16 September 1958	13 December 1958
14	14th	1959	Víctor Andrés Belaúnde	Peru	Dag Hammarskjöld	15 September 1959	12 December 1959
15	15th	1960	Frederick Henry Boland	Ireland	Dag Hammarskjöld	20 September 1960	20 December 1960
16	16th	1961	Mongi Slim	Tunisia	U Thant (Acting) (Note: Dag Hammarskjöld died on 18 September 1961, one day before the 16th session opened. U Thant of Burma served as Acting Secretary-General from 3 November 1961 and was confirmed in office on 30 November 1962.)	19 September 1961	20 December 1961
17	17th	1962	Muhammad Zafrulla Khan	Pakistan	U Thant	18 September 1962	20 December 1962
18	18th	1963	Carlos Sosa Rodríguez	Venezuela	U Thant	17 September 1963	17 December 1963
19	19th	1964–65	Alex Quaison-Sackey	Ghana	U Thant	1 December 1964 (Note: The 19th session opened on 1 December 1964, severely curtailed by the Article 19 financial dispute over peacekeeping assessments. Substantive debate was minimal and no formal votes were taken during the session.)	18 February 1965
20	20th	1965	Amintore Fanfani	Italy	U Thant	21 September 1965	21 December 1965
21	21st	1966	Abdul Rahman Pazhwak	Afghanistan	U Thant	20 September 1966	20 December 1966
22	22nd	1967	Corneliu Mănescu	Romania	U Thant	19 September 1967	22 December 1967
23	23rd	1968	Emilio Arenales	Guatemala	U Thant	24 September 1968	20 December 1968
24	24th	1969	Angie Brooks	Liberia	U Thant	16 September 1969	17 December 1969
25	25th	1970	Edvard Hambro	Norway	U Thant	15 September 1970	17 December 1970
26	26th	1971	Adam Malik	Indonesia	U Thant	21 September 1971	22 December 1971
27	27th	1972	Stanisław Trepczyński	Poland	Kurt Waldheim	19 September 1972	19 December 1972
28	28th	1973	Leopoldo Benites	Ecuador	Kurt Waldheim	18 September 1973	18 December 1973
29	29th	1974	Abdelaziz Bouteflika	Algeria	Kurt Waldheim	17 September 1974	18 December 1974
30	30th	1975	Gaston Thorn	Luxembourg	Kurt Waldheim	16 September 1975	17 December 1975
31	31st	1976	Hamilton Shirley Amerasinghe	Sri Lanka	Kurt Waldheim	21 September 1976	22 December 1976
32	32nd	1977	Lazar Mojsov	Yugoslavia	Kurt Waldheim	20 September 1977	21 December 1977
33	33rd	1978	Indalecio Liévano	Colombia	Kurt Waldheim	25 September 1978	21 December 1978
34	34th	1979	Salim Ahmed Salim	Tanzania	Kurt Waldheim	18 September 1979	19 December 1979
35	35th	1980	Rüdiger von Wechmar	West Germany	Kurt Waldheim	23 September 1980	22 December 1980
36	36th	1981	Ismat Kittani	Iraq	Kurt Waldheim	22 September 1981	21 December 1981
37	37th	1982	Imre Hollai	Hungary	Javier Pérez de Cuéllar	21 September 1982	21 December 1982
38	38th	1983	Jorge Illueca	Panama	Javier Pérez de Cuéllar	20 September 1983	20 December 1983
39	39th	1984	Paul Lusaka	Zambia	Javier Pérez de Cuéllar	25 September 1984	18 December 1984
40	40th	1985	Jaime de Piniés	Spain	Javier Pérez de Cuéllar	23 September 1985	18 December 1985
41	41st	1986	Humayun Rasheed Choudhury	Bangladesh	Javier Pérez de Cuéllar	22 September 1986	19 December 1986
42	42nd	1987	Peter Florin	East Germany	Javier Pérez de Cuéllar	22 September 1987	22 December 1987
43	43rd	1988	Dante M. Caputo	Argentina	Javier Pérez de Cuéllar	26 September 1988	20 December 1988
44	44th	1989	Joseph Nanven Garba	Nigeria	Javier Pérez de Cuéllar	25 September 1989	22 December 1989
45	45th	1990	Guido de Marco	Malta	Javier Pérez de Cuéllar	24 September 1990	21 December 1990
46	46th	1991	Samir S. Shihabi	Saudi Arabia	Javier Pérez de Cuéllar	23 September 1991	20 December 1991
47	47th	1992	Stoyan Ganev	Bulgaria	Boutros Boutros-Ghali	21 September 1992	2 October 1992
48	48th	1993	Samuel R. Insanally	Guyana	Boutros Boutros-Ghali	27 September 1993	8 October 1993
49	49th	1994	Amara Essy	Côte d'Ivoire	Boutros Boutros-Ghali	26 September 1994	7 October 1994
50	50th	1995	Diogo Freitas do Amaral	Portugal	Boutros Boutros-Ghali	25 September 1995	13 October 1995
51	51st	1996	Razali Ismail	Malaysia	Boutros Boutros-Ghali	23 September 1996	4 October 1996
52	52nd	1997	Hennadiy Udovenko	Ukraine	Kofi Annan	22 September 1997	3 October 1997
53	53rd	1998	Didier Opertti	Uruguay	Kofi Annan	21 September 1998	1 October 1998
54	54th	1999	Theo-Ben Gurirab	Namibia	Kofi Annan	20 September 1999	1 October 1999
55	55th	2000	Harri Holkeri	Finland	Kofi Annan	20 September 2000	29 September 2000
56	56th	2001	Han Seung-soo	South Korea	Kofi Annan	10 November 2001 (Note: The 56th session general debate was postponed from September to November 2001 following the September 11 attacks in New York City and Washington, D.C.)	16 November 2001
57	57th	2002	Jan Kavan	Czech Republic	Kofi Annan	12 September 2002 (Note: The 57th session general debate was held 12–16 September 2002, earlier than the standard late-September slot. Resolution 57/301, adopted later that session, subsequently standardised the debate to open on the Tuesday of the fourth full week of September.)	16 September 2002
58	58th	2003	Julian Robert Hunte	Saint Lucia	Kofi Annan	23 September 2003	29 September 2003
59	59th	2004	Jean Ping	Gabon	Kofi Annan	21 September 2004	1 October 2004
60	60th	2005	Jan Eliasson	Sweden	Kofi Annan	14 September 2005	23 September 2005
61	61st	2006	Haya Rashed Al Khalifa	Bahrain	Kofi Annan	19 September 2006	27 September 2006
62	62nd	2007	Srgjan Kerim	North Macedonia	Ban Ki-moon	25 September 2007	1 October 2007
63	63rd	2008	Miguel d'Escoto Brockmann	Nicaragua	Ban Ki-moon	23 September 2008	29 September 2008
64	64th	2009	Ali Abdussalam Treki	Libya	Ban Ki-moon	23 September 2009	29 September 2009
65	65th	2010	Joseph Deiss	Switzerland	Ban Ki-moon	23 September 2010	30 September 2010
66	66th	2011	Nassir Abdulaziz Al-Nasser	Qatar	Ban Ki-moon	22 September 2011	27 September 2011
67	67th	2012	Vuk Jeremić	Serbia	Ban Ki-moon	25 September 2012	1 October 2012
68	68th	2013	John William Ashe	Antigua and Barbuda	Ban Ki-moon	24 September 2013	1 October 2013
69	69th	2014	Sam Kutesa	Uganda	Ban Ki-moon	24 September 2014	30 September 2014
70	70th	2015	Mogens Lykketoft	Denmark	Ban Ki-moon	28 September 2015	3 October 2015
71	71st	2016	Peter Thomson (diplomat)	Fiji	Ban Ki-moon	20 September 2016	26 September 2016
72	72nd	2017	Miroslav Lajčák	Slovakia	António Guterres	19 September 2017	25 September 2017
73	73rd	2018	María Fernanda Espinosa	Ecuador	António Guterres	25 September 2018	1 October 2018
74	74th	2019	Tijjani Muhammad-Bande	Nigeria	António Guterres	24 September 2019	30 September 2019
75	75th	2020	Volkan Bozkır	Turkey	António Guterres	22 September 2020 (Note: Held remotely due to the COVID-19 pandemic)	29 September 2020
76	76th	2021	Abdulla Shahid	Maldives	António Guterres	21 September 2021 (Note: Held in a hybrid format)	27 September 2021
77	77th	2022	Csaba Kőrösi	Hungary	António Guterres	20 September 2022	26 September 2022
78	78th	2023	Dennis Francis	Trinidad and Tobago	António Guterres	19 September 2023	26 September 2023
79	79th	2024	Philemon Yang	Cameroon	António Guterres	24 September 2024	30 September 2024
80	80th	2025	Annalena Baerbock	Germany	António Guterres	23 September 2025	29 September 2025
81	81st	2026	Khalilur Rahman	Bangladesh	António Guterres	22 September 2026	28 September 2026
