= United Nations General Assembly Resolution 377 (V) =

1950 resolution establishing GA emergency special sessions

United Nations General Assembly (UNGA) resolution 377 A, the "Uniting for Peace" resolution, states that in any cases where the Security Council, because of a lack of unanimity among its five permanent members (P5), fails to act as required to maintain international security and peace, the General Assembly shall consider the matter immediately and may issue appropriate recommendations to UN members for collective measures, including the use of armed force when necessary, in order to maintain or restore international security and peace. It was adopted 3 November 1950, after fourteen days of Assembly discussions, by a vote of 52 to 5, with 2 abstentions. The resolution was designed to provide the UN with an alternative avenue for action when at least one P5 member uses its veto to obstruct the Security Council from carrying out its functions mandated by the UN Charter.

To facilitate prompt action by the General Assembly in the case of a deadlocked Security Council, the resolution created the mechanism of the emergency special session (ESS). Emergency special sessions have been convened under this procedure on eleven occasions, with the most recent convened in February 2022, to address Russia's invasion of Ukraine. However, unlike the preceding ESSs, the tenth ESS and the eleventh ESS have been 'adjourned' and 'resumed' on numerous occasions over the past several years, and remain temporarily adjourned. Indeed, more than ten separate 'plenary meetings' have been held by the Assembly, whilst sitting in the tenth ESS since 2000, and over twenty, whilst sitting in the eleventh ESS since 2022.

== Text of the General Assembly resolution ==
Reaffirming the importance of the exercise by the Security Council of its primary responsibility for the maintenance of international peace and security, and the duty of the permanent members to seek unanimity and to exercise restraint in the use of the veto, ...

Conscious that failure of the Security Council to discharge its responsibilities on behalf of all the Member States ... does not relieve Member States of their obligations or the United Nations of its responsibility under the Charter to maintain international peace and security,

Recognizing in particular that such failure does not deprive the General Assembly of its rights or relieve it of its responsibilities under the Charter in regard to the maintenance of international peace and security, ...

Resolves that if the Security Council, because of lack of unanimity of the permanent members, fails to exercise its primary responsibility for the maintenance of international peace and security in any case where there appears to be a threat to the peace, breach of the peace, or act of aggression, the General Assembly shall consider the matter immediately with a view to making appropriate recommendations to Members for collective measures, including in the case of a breach of the peace or act of aggression the use of armed force when necessary, to maintain or restore international peace and security.

== Origins ==
The Uniting for Peace resolution was initiated by the United States, and submitted by the "Joint Seven-Powers" in October 1950, as a means of circumventing further Soviet vetoes during the course of the Korean War (25 June 1950 – 27 July 1953). It was adopted by 52 votes to 5, with 2 abstentions.

In the closing days of Assembly discussions leading up to the adoption of 377 A, US delegate to the UN, John Foster Dulles, made specific reference to the Korean War as a chief motivator in the passage of the resolution:

Then came the armed attack on the Republic of Korea and it seemed that the pattern of 1931 had in fact begun to repeat itself and that the third world war might be in the making. And that might have been—and I think it would have been—had it not been for a series of accidental circumstances which made it possible to improvise collective resistance to that aggression.

The principal accidental circumstance referred to by Dulles was that the Soviet Union was boycotting the Security Council at the time of the outbreak of hostilities in Korea, and had been since January 1950, owing to its discontent over the UN's refusal to recognize the People's Republic of China's representatives as the legitimate representatives of China, returning only on 1 August 1950 to assume the rotating role of Council President, for that month. This circumstance had meant that the Security Council was able to adopt its resolutions 83, of 27 June 1950, and 84, of 7 July 1950, thereby establishing a UN-mandated force for South Korea "to repel the armed attack" from the North. Had the Soviet Union been seated at the Council during the months of June and July, the relevant draft resolutions would almost certainly have been vetoed, and the United States was well aware of this, as evidenced by the above statement.

== Assembly discussions on the "Joint Seven-Power draft resolution" ==
Some of the key statements made during Assembly discussions on 377 A, whilst sitting in plenary, include:

=== United States (John Foster Dulles) ===
If, in response to our resolution, the Member States do actually establish a system which ensures that aggression will be promptly exposed, if they maintain a collective strength, and if they have both the will and the way to use that strength promptly in case of need, then a third world war may be permanently averted ... It would be vastly reassuring to all who love peace if here we could adopt unanimously a programme which only aggressors need fear. ... We must organize dependably the collective will to resist. If the Security Council does not do so, then this Assembly must do what it can by invoking its residual power of recommendation ... As the world moves in the path that this resolution defines, it will move nearer and nearer to the Charter ideal.

=== United Kingdom (Kenneth Gilmour Younger) ===
The Soviet Union ... has attributed to the Council a power which it has never had under the Charter, namely, the power to insist that, because the Council has itself been reduced to impotence in the face of aggression by disagreement among its permanent members, the entire world Organisation shall wash its hands of the whole matter and let aggression take its course. The Council has never possessed any such right. Indeed, it is impossible to conceive that the authors of the Charter at San Francisco would have lent themselves to a proposition so far out of tune with the hopes and wishes of the peoples of the world. ... This resolution should help to make aggression less likely by giving notice to any intending aggressor that he risks uniting the world against him ... All the peace-loving nations must welcome the strengthening of the forces of peace which the passing of these resolutions will represent.

=== France (Jean Chauvel) ===
France supports the Charter—the whole Charter ... Where peace and security are at stake, France considers that the General Assembly and the Security Council should assume all the responsibilities laid upon them by the Charter ... It is unthinkable that this entire machinery, designed to safeguard the peace and security of the world, should remain inactive when there is a threat to peace and security. And if ... there is a real danger of such inactivity, then we must revise our customs, our methods, our rules and our interpretations. ... My delegation felt ... that it was unnecessary to revise the Charter, which itself afforded the means of ensuring that its principles should be applied ... The draft resolution does not infringe upon the Security Council’s competence, responsibilities or powers. The Council should fulfil its role; if it does so it will be adequate ... If, however, for some reason, it does not fulfil its role, the United Nations will not thereby be paralysed. A special [emergency] session of the General Assembly can be convened within twenty-four hours and the Assembly ... can discuss and adopt any recommendations which appear necessary for the maintenance or re-establishment of peace and security.

=== Soviet Union (Andrey Vyshinsky) ===
The organizers of the Anglo-American bloc, in their inflammatory speeches against the USSR ... yesterday and today, tried to create the impression that they wanted to organize a check against any possible aggressor ... As if our troops were waging war in every country! As if we had surrounded the world with a fiery ring of naval, air and other bases! As if we were conducting a furious armaments race, daily spending more and more thousands of millions which the taxpayer, the ordinary American people, have to provide! As if we really did not want to outlaw the atomic bomb! Yet this draft resolution does not even refer to the necessity of ensuring that the atomic bomb is outlawed! ... We must now have been seeking for some five years to ensure that a decision to outlaw the atomic bomb—the use of the atomic bomb—is taken. ... We base our arguments on the fundamental provision laid down in Article 10 of the Charter, namely, that the General Assembly may discuss and make recommendations on any matters relating to the powers and functions of any organs of the United Nations—and consequently of an organ such as the Security Council—except as otherwise provided. But two exceptions are provided. The first, which applies to all matters, is to be found in Article 12, paragraph 1, which says that when the Security Council is considering these questions or exercising its functions in respect thereof, the General Assembly shall not make any recommendation ... The other exception is in the last sentence of Article 11, paragraph 2, which says that if a question which may be considered by the General Assembly calls for enforcement action ... then it must necessarily be referred to the Security Council ... But there is a basic reservation ... It is that ... the General Assembly may decide, what measures "not involving the use of force" are to be employed. Severance of diplomatic relations is a measure not involving the use of armed force. Interruption of economic relations is an enforcement measure not involving the use of armed force.

== Invocation of General Assembly 377 ==
The Uniting for Peace resolution was implemented 13 times between 1951 and 2022. It has been invoked by both the Security Council (eight times) and the General Assembly (five times). Eleven of those cases took the form of an Emergency Special Session.

=== Security Council invoked ===
==== Middle East (1956) – France and UK veto – 1st Emergency Special Session ====
Invoked by Security Council Resolution 119. Although "Uniting for Peace" was enacted because of Soviet vetoes, its first use was against two NATO members. The First Emergency Special Session (of the UNGA) was instigated by a procedural vote of the Security Council on its Resolution 119 of 31 October 1956, as a result of the Suez Crisis, which commenced 29 October 1956. France and the United Kingdom were the only two Council members to vote against the adoption of Resolution 119, and were likewise, along with Israel, the principal antagonists in the conflict with Egypt. The session's meetings were held between 1 November and 10 November 1956.

On 7 November 1956, the General Assembly adopted Resolution 1001 (ES-I), thereby establishing the United Nations Emergency Force I (UNEF I) to "secure and supervise the cessation of hostilities". The UNGA, by its own resolutions, not only established UNEF I, but also called for "an immediate cease-fire", and recommended "that all Member States refrain from introducing military goods in the area", thereby authorizing military sanctions

==== Hungary (1956) – USSR veto – 2nd Emergency Special Session ====
Invoked by Security Council Resolution 120. The Second Emergency Special Session on "The Situation in Hungary" adopted five resolutions, including Resolution 1004 (ES-II) mandating a commission of inquiry into foreign intervention in Hungary.

==== Middle East (1958) – USSR veto – 3rd Emergency Special Session ====
Invoked by Security Council Resolution 129. Sitting in August 1958, the Third Emergency Special Session on "The Situation in the Middle East" adopted Resolution 1237 (ES-III) calling for early withdrawal of foreign troops from Jordan and Lebanon.

==== Congo (1960) – USSR veto – 4th Emergency Special Session ====
Invoked by Security Council Resolution 157. In September 1960 the Fourth Emergency Special Session on the "Congo Situation" adopted Resolution 1474 (ES-IV)/Rev. 1/ requesting Secretary-General to continue to take vigorous action in accordance with Security Council resolutions and appealing to all Members for urgent voluntary contributions to a UN Fund for the Congo and to refrain from sending military assistance except through the UN.

==== Bangladesh (1971) – USSR veto – Resolved without Special Session ====
Invoked by Security Council Resolution 303. In December 1971 the Twenty-Sixth Regular Session was seated. No Emergency Special Session was needed and the issue was handled under the agenda item "UN Assistance to East Pakistan Refugees".

==== Afghanistan (1980) – USSR veto – 6th Emergency Special Session ====
Invoked by Security Council Resolution 462. The Sixth Emergency Special Session on "The Situation in Afghanistan" adopted Resolution ES-6/2 calling for the immediate, unconditional and total withdrawal of foreign troops from Afghanistan.

==== Middle East (1982) – US veto – 9th Emergency Special Session ====
Invoked by Security Council Resolution 500. The Ninth Emergency Special Session on "The Situation in the Middle East" adopted Resolution ES-9/1 declaring Israel a non-peace-loving state and calling on members to apply a number of measures on Israel.

==== Ukraine (2022) – Russia veto – 11th Emergency Special Session ====
Invoked by Security Council Resolution 2623. The Eleventh Emergency Special Session on "The Situation in Ukraine" first met on 28 February 2022. The eleventh ESS has been 'adjourned' and 'resumed' on numerous occasions over the past several years, and remains adjourned. Indeed, over twenty separate 'plenary meetings' have been held by the Assembly, whilst sitting in the eleventh ESS, since 2022.

=== General Assembly invoked ===
==== Korea (1951) – USSR veto ====
Following three vetoes by the USSR on situation in Korea, six Security Council members requested the General Assembly to consider the situation (A/1618). The Security Council subsequently removed the item from its agenda, enabling the General Assembly to freely discuss the matter under Article 11 of the UN Charter. In Resolution 498(V), the Assembly used the language of the Uniting for Peace resolution: "noting that the Security Council, because of lack of unanimity of the permanent members, has failed to exercise its primary responsibility for the maintenance of international peace and security with regard to Chinese communist intervention in Korea ..."

==== Middle East (1967) – USSR failed to obtain 9 votes – 5th Emergency Special Session ====
Invoked by General Assembly at the request of USSR (A/6717) and vote (98-3-3). The Fifth Emergency Special Session on "The Situation in the Middle East" adopted six resolutions, including Resolutions 2253 (ES-V) and Resolution 2254 (ES-V) calling on Israel to rescind unilateral measures in Jerusalem.

==== Palestine (1980) – US veto – 7th Emergency Special Session ====
Invoked by General Assembly at the request of Senegal (A/ES-7/1). The Seventh Emergency Special Session on "The Question of Palestine" adopted eight resolutions (ES-7/2 through ES-7/9) calling for the unconditional and total withdrawal of Israel from territories occupied since 1967.

==== Namibia (1981) – France, UK and US veto – 8th Emergency Special Session ====
Invoked by General Assembly at the request of Zimbabwe (A/ES-8/1). The Eighth Emergency Special Session was convened by Zimbabwe in order to discuss the "Question of Namibia". Its meetings were conducted between 3 September and 14 September 1981.

At the conclusion of the final meeting of the session, the Assembly adopted resolution A/RES/ES-8/2:

Declaring that the illegal occupation of Namibia by South Africa together with the repeated acts of aggression committed by South Africa against neighbouring States constitute a breach of international peace and security,

Noting with regret and concern that the Security Council failed to exercise its primary responsibility for the maintenance of international peace and security when draft resolutions proposing comprehensive mandatory sanctions against South Africa under Chapter VII of the Charter of the United Nations were vetoed by the three Western permanent members of the Council on 30 April 1981, ...

6. Calls upon Member States, specialized agencies and other international organizations to render increased and sustained support and material, financial, military and other assistance to the South West Africa People's Organization to enable it to intensify its struggle for the liberation of Namibia; ...

13. Calls upon all States, in view of the threat to international peace and security posed by South Africa, to impose against that country comprehensive mandatory sanctions in accordance with the provisions of the Charter;

14. Also strongly urges States to cease forthwith, individually and collectively, all dealings with South Africa in order totally to isolate it politically, economically, militarily and culturally; ...

This was the first occasion on which the Assembly authorized economic, diplomatic and cultural sanctions against a state; it had already authorized military sanctions by its resolution 1001 of 7 November 1956, during its first emergency special session.

==== Palestine (1997) – US veto – 10th Emergency Special Session ====
Invoked by General Assembly request of Qatar (A/ES/10/1). The Tenth Emergency Special Session on "The Question of Palestine", still in session, adopted inter alia, Resolution ES-10/14 requesting an advisory opinion from the International Court of Justice.

== Uniting for Peace and the Security Council 'veto power' ==
It has been argued that with the adoption of the 'Uniting for Peace' resolution by the General Assembly, and given the interpretations of the Assembly's powers that became customary international law as a result, the Security Council 'power of veto' problem could be surmounted. By adopting A/RES/377 A, on 3 November 1950, over two-thirds of UN Member states declared that, according to the UN Charter, the permanent members of the UNSC cannot and should not prevent the UNGA from taking any and all action necessary to restore international peace and security, in cases where the UNSC has failed to exercise its 'primary responsibility' for maintaining peace. Such an interpretation sees the UNGA as being awarded 'final responsibility'—rather than 'secondary responsibility'—for matters of international peace and security, by the UN Charter. Various official and semi-official UN reports make explicit reference to the Uniting for Peace resolution as providing a mechanism for the UNGA to overrule any UNSC vetoes.

== Treatment of the Uniting for Peace resolution by the International Court of Justice ==
- ICJ, Certain Expenses of the United Nations (Article 17, paragraph 2, of the Charter), Advisory Opinion of 20 July 1962, ICJ Reports 1962, p. 151.
- ICJ, Legal Consequences for States of the Continued Presence of South Africa in Namibia (South West Africa) notwithstanding Security Council Resolution 276 (1970), Advisory Opinion, ICJ Reports 1971, p. 16.
- ICJ, Legal Consequences of the Construction of a Wall in the Occupied Palestinian Territory, Advisory Opinion, ICJ Reports 2004, p. 136.
