= Emergency special session of the United Nations General Assembly =

An emergency special session of the United Nations General Assembly (abbr. ESS of UNGA) is an unscheduled meeting of the United Nations General Assembly to make urgent recommendations on a particular issue. Such recommendations can include collective measures and can include the use of armed force when necessary to maintain or restore international peace and security in the case of a breach of the peace or act of aggression when the United Nations Security Council fails to exercise its responsibility for the maintenance of international peace and security due to lack of unanimity of its permanent ("veto") members.

Under Chapter Five of the Charter of the United Nations, the Security Council is normally entrusted with maintaining international peace and security. However, on 3 November 1950, the General Assembly passed Resolution 377 (Uniting for Peace) which expanded its authority to consider topics that were previously reserved solely for the Security Council. Under the Resolution, if the Security Council cannot come to a decision on an issue because of a lack of unanimity, the General Assembly may hold an emergency special session within 24 hours to consider the same matter.

The mechanism of the emergency special session was created in 1950 by the General Assembly's adoption of its "Uniting for Peace" resolution, which made the necessary changes to the Assembly's Rules of Procedure. The resolution likewise declared that:

... if the Security Council, because of lack of unanimity of the permanent members, fails to exercise its primary responsibility for the maintenance of international peace and security in any case where there appears to be a threat to the peace, breach of the peace, or act of aggression, the General Assembly shall consider the matter immediately with a view to making appropriate recommendations to Members for collective measures, including in the case of a breach of the peace or act of aggression the use of armed force when necessary, to maintain or restore international peace and security. If not in session at the time, the General Assembly may meet in emergency special session within twenty-four hours of the request therefor. Such emergency special session shall be called if requested by the Security Council on the vote of any seven members, or by a majority of the Members of the United Nations...

Emergency special sessions are rare, a fact reflected in that there have been only eleven such sessions in the history of the United Nations. Additionally, most emergency special sessions run for a single plenary meeting, with the exception of the 7th (closed), 10th and 11th (both temporarily adjourned), which have been reconvened four, seventeen, and twenty one times respectively.

== Procedure ==
The procedure to call an emergency special session are laid out in the Rules of Procedure of the General Assembly. The rules pertaining to emergency special sessions are as follows (as amended by Res. 1991 that increased majority needed from 7 to 9):

- Rule 8(b) – Summoning at the request of the Security Council or Members
  - Emergency special sessions can be convened by a vote of nine members of the Security Council, or a majority of United Nations Member States. These sessions must be convened within 24 hours of any votes.
- Rule 9(b) – Request by Members
  - Allows any Member State of the United Nations to request the Secretary-General to convene an emergency special session.
- Rule 10 – Notification of session
  - Requires the Secretary-General to notify Member States, at least 12 hours in advance, of the opening of an emergency special session convened pursuant to rule 8(b).
- Rule 16 – Agenda
  - States that the provisional agenda of an emergency special session shall be communicated to Member States simultaneously with the communication convening the session.
- Rule 19 – Additional items
  - During an emergency special session, additional agenda items may be added for consideration by a two-thirds majority of the members present and voting.
- Rule 20 – Explanatory memorandum
  - Requires any item proposed for inclusion in the agenda to be accompanied by an explanatory memorandum.

== Sessions ==
Emergency special session	Topic	Convened by	Date	Resolution
First	Suez Crisis	United Nations Security Council	1–10 November 1956	A/3354
Second	Soviet invasion of Hungary	United Nations Security Council	4–10 November 1956	A/3355
Third	Lebanon crisis	United Nations Security Council	8–21 August 1958	A/3905
Fourth	Congo Crisis	United Nations Security Council	17–19 September 1960	A/4510
Fifth	Six-Day War	Soviet Union	17 June – 18 September 1967	A/6798
Sixth	Soviet invasion of Afghanistan	United Nations Security Council	10–14 January 1980	ES-6/1, 2
Seventh	Israeli–Palestinian conflict	Senegal	22–29 July 1980; 20–28 April 1982; 25–26 June 1982; 16–19 August 1982; 24 September 1982	ES-7/1, 2, 3 ES-7/4; ES-7/5; ES-7/6; ES-7/9
Eighth	South African occupation of Namibia (South West Africa)	Zimbabwe	3–14 September 1981	ES-8/1, 2
Ninth	Israeli occupation of the Golan Heights (Golan Heights Law)	United Nations Security Council	29 January – 5 February 1982	ES-9/1
Tenth	Israeli-Palestinian conflict (East Jerusalem and Israeli-occupied territories)	Various	24–25 April 1997; 15 July 1997; 13 November 1997; 17 March 1998; 5, 8 and 9 February 1999; 18 and 20 October 2000; 20 December 2001; 7 May 2002; 5 August 2002; 19 September 2003; 20–21 October 2003; 3 December 2003; 20 July 2004; 24 January 2007; 4 April 2007; 23 January 2009; 21 December 2017; 13 June 2018; 26-27 October 2023; 12 December 2023; 10 May 2024; 19 September 2024; 11 December 2024; 12 June 2025	ES-10/1, 2 ES-10/3; ES-10/4; ES-10/5; ES-10/6; ES-10/7; ES-10/8, 9 ES-10/10; ES-10/11; ES-10/12; ES-10/13; ES-10/14; ES-10/15; ES-10/16; ES-10/17; ES-10/18; ES-10/19; ES-10/20; ES-10/21; ES-10/22; ES-10/23; ES-10/24; ES-10/25; ES-10/26; ES-10/27
Eleventh	Russian invasion of Ukraine	United Nations Security Council	28 February–2 March 2022; 23–24 March 2022; 7 April 2022; 10-12 October 2022; 23 February 2023; 24 February 2025; 3 December 2025; 24 February 2026	ES-11/1; ES-11/2; ES-11/3; ES-11/4; ES-11/5; ES-11/6; ES-11/7; ES-11/8; ES-11/9; ES-11/10

== See also ==
- List of UN General Assembly sessions
