= Sixth emergency special session of the United Nations General Assembly =

1980 session of the United Nations General Assembly

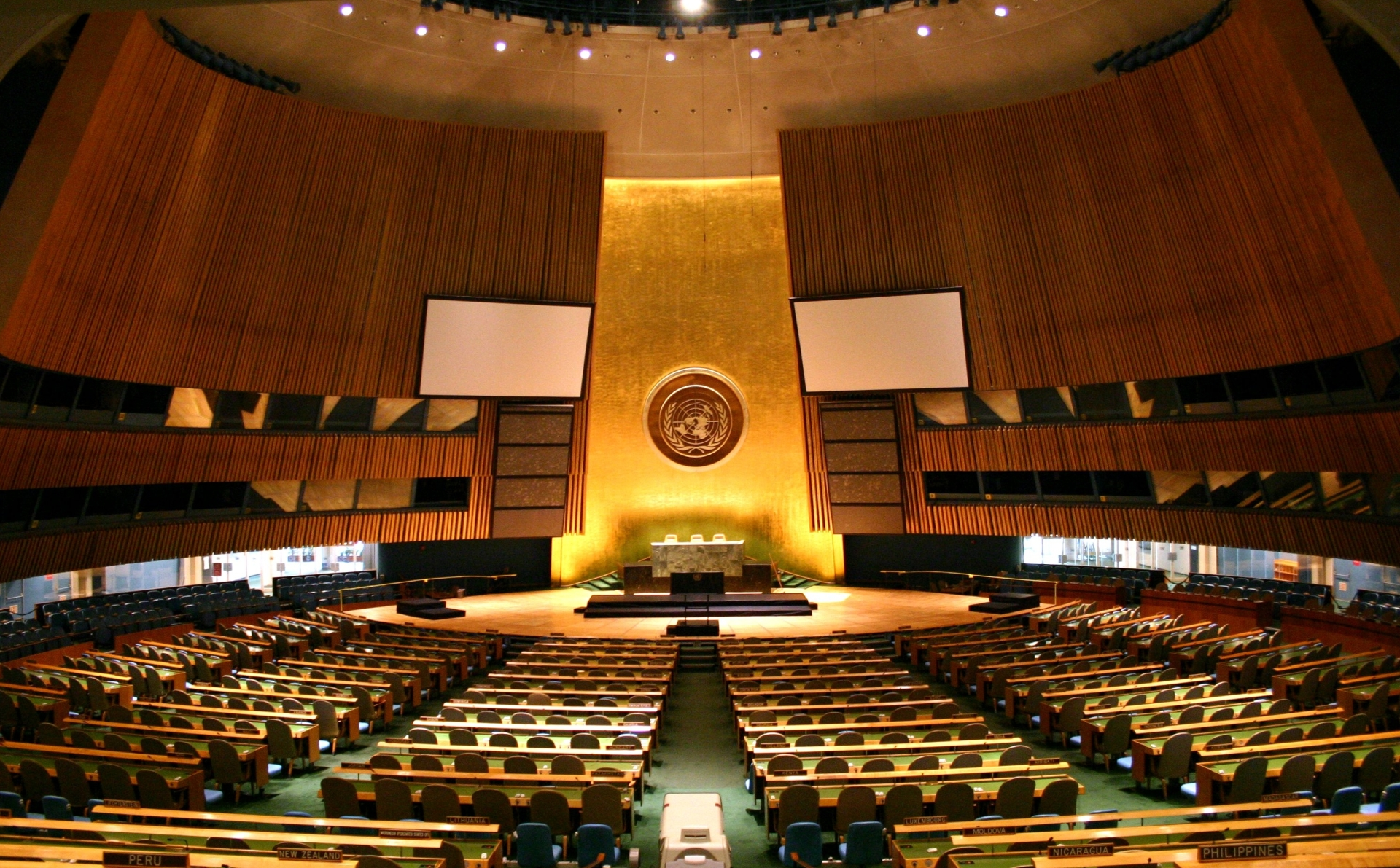
- General Assembly Hall
- Cities: New York City, New York, U.S.
- Venues: General Assembly Hall at the United Nations headquarters
- Participants: United Nations Member States
- Secretary: Kurt Waldheim

The sixth emergency special session of the United Nations General Assembly was held between 10 and 14 January 1980 to consider the situation in Afghanistan. As the what is known as the Soviet–Afghan War began, members of the United Nations General Assembly requested the Security Council consider the situation. The USSR veto of a resolution led the other members to invoke the 'Uniting for Peace' resolution to defer the issue to the General Assembly in an emergency special session. It was the sixth emergency special session since the 'Uniting for Peace' resolution was adopted in 1950. The session was dominated by questions of its legitimacy since the lately-hatched and newly-recognized Democratic Republic of Afghanistan had invited the Soviet intervention in their civil war. Led by the non-aligned members, the session ended with a resolution from the General Assembly calling for the immediate, unconditional and total withdrawal of foreign troops from Afghanistan and the cessation of all outside intervention, subversion, coercion or constraint, of any kind whatsoever, so that its people could freely choose its own economic, political and social systems. The Soviet machine scored a (as it would turn out pyrrhic) victory when, in the words of political scientist William Maley, "the General Assembly accepted the credentials of the delegation of the Soviet-installed puppet regime in Kabul which duly voted against the resolution," thus cementing the notion that it had invited them as peacekeepers.

== Background ==
During the Saur Revolution on April 27, 1978, the communist People's Democratic Party of Afghanistan, aided by the Khalq faction of the military, overthrew the government of Republic of Afghanistan and formed the Democratic Republic of Afghanistan. A significant insurgency formed, led by the Mujahideen, and fought the new government who requested Soviet assistance to fight back. In December, they signed a Treaty of Friendship with the USSR and the Soviets provided military assistance. Meanwhile, the United States began funding and arming the insurgency. On December 17, 1979, PDPA general secretary Hafizullah Amin requested Soviet assistance in a major offensive. The Soviets agreed and on 27 December, dressed in Afghan military uniforms, invaded Kabul but overthrew Amin and installed Babrak Karmal as the new leader, clearing the way for a large-scale occupation.

At the UN General Assembly, a letter was sent to the president of the Security Council requesting a Security Council meeting to consider the matter (letter signed jointly by Australia, The Bahamas, Belgium, Canada, Chile, Colombia, Costa Rica, Denmark, The Dominican Republic, Egypt, El Salvador, Ecuador, Fiji, The Federal Republic of Germany (West Germany), Greece, Haiti, Honduras, Iceland, Italy, Japan, Liberia, Luxembourg, New Zealand, Norway, Oman, Pakistan, Panama, Papua New-Guinea, Philippines, Portugal, Santa Lucia, Saudi Arabia, Singapore, Suriname, Sweden, The Netherlands, Turkey, The United Kingdom, Uruguay, The USA and Venezuela). The Security Council convened between the 5 and 9 of January 1980. Afghanistan and the Soviet Union denounced the meeting as interfering with domestic affairs of a Member State and that they were exercising their Treaty of Friendship and their right to collective self-defense under Article 51 of the UN Charter. The United States claimed the Soviet intervention violated the territorial integrity of Afghanistan and that with the death of General Secretary Amin, by Soviet forces, the Afghan government had been overthrown. A draft resolution calling for the immediate, unconditional and total withdrawal of the foreign troops was vetoed by the Soviet Union on the 7 of January. Two days later the Security Council adopted Resolution 462 acknowledging the lack of unanimity of its permanent members was preventing them from fulfilling their primary duty of maintaining peace and security, invoking the General Assembly's 'Uniting for Peace' resolution calling for an emergency special session. This was adopted with 12 supports, 2 opposes (USSR and German Democratic Republic), with 1 abstention (Zambia).

== Emergency special session ==
The sixth emergency special session of the United Nations General Assembly began on 10 January. The session was dominated by questions of its legitimacy. In a speech, the representative from Afghanistan expressed "the strongest and most categorical objections to the discussion of the so-called question of the situation in Afghanistan. The convening of a special session of the General Assembly on this issue constitutes an open and flagrant interference in the internal affairs of the Democratic Republic of Afghanistan." The Soviets also argued that the session was being held in contravention to Charter of the United Nations which respects the internal affairs of member states. Surprisingly, India sided with the Soviet Union in a speech by Brajesh Mishra on 11 January when he acknowledged that the Soviets provided the assistance that both General Secretary Amin and his successor requested, and furthermore, that the Soviets would leave Afghanistan at the request of the Afghanistan government. Pakistan, which had been taking in refugees at its border with Afghanistan, took a particularly harsh stance against the Soviets and called for them to withdraw their forces.

Led by the non-aligned members, the General Assembly adopted Resolution ES-6/2 "strongly deplor[ing] the recent armed intervention in Afghanistan…[and] appeals to all States to respect the sovereignty, territorial integrity, political independence and non-aligned character of Afghanistan and to refrain from any interference in the internal affairs of that country [and] calls for the immediate, unconditional and total withdrawal of the foreign troops from Afghanistan in order to enable its people to determine their own form of government and choose their economic, political and social systems free from outside intervention, subversion, coercion or constraint of any kind whatsoever..." The resolution also appealed to all states and organizations for humanitarian relief for refugees via the UN High Commissioner for Refugees.

== See also ==
- Emergency special session of the United Nations General Assembly
- First emergency special session of the United Nations General Assembly
- Seventh emergency special session of the United Nations General Assembly
- Tenth emergency special session of the United Nations General Assembly
