= United Nations Register of Damage Caused by the Construction of the Wall in the Occupied Palestinian Territory =

The United Nations Register of Damage Caused by the Construction of the Wall in the Occupied Palestinian Territory (UNRoD) is a subsidiary organ of the United Nations General Assembly. Its mandate is to serve as a record, in documentary form, of the damage caused to all natural and legal persons concerned as a result of the construction of the Israeli West Bank barrier by Israel in the Palestinian territories, including in and around East Jerusalem. Its offices are based at the United Nations Office at Vienna in Vienna, Austria.

UNRoD was established in January 2007, at the tenth emergency special session of the United Nations General Assembly, by way of Resolution ES-10/17 of the General Assembly.
