= First emergency special session of the United Nations General Assembly =

1956 session of the United Nations General Assembly

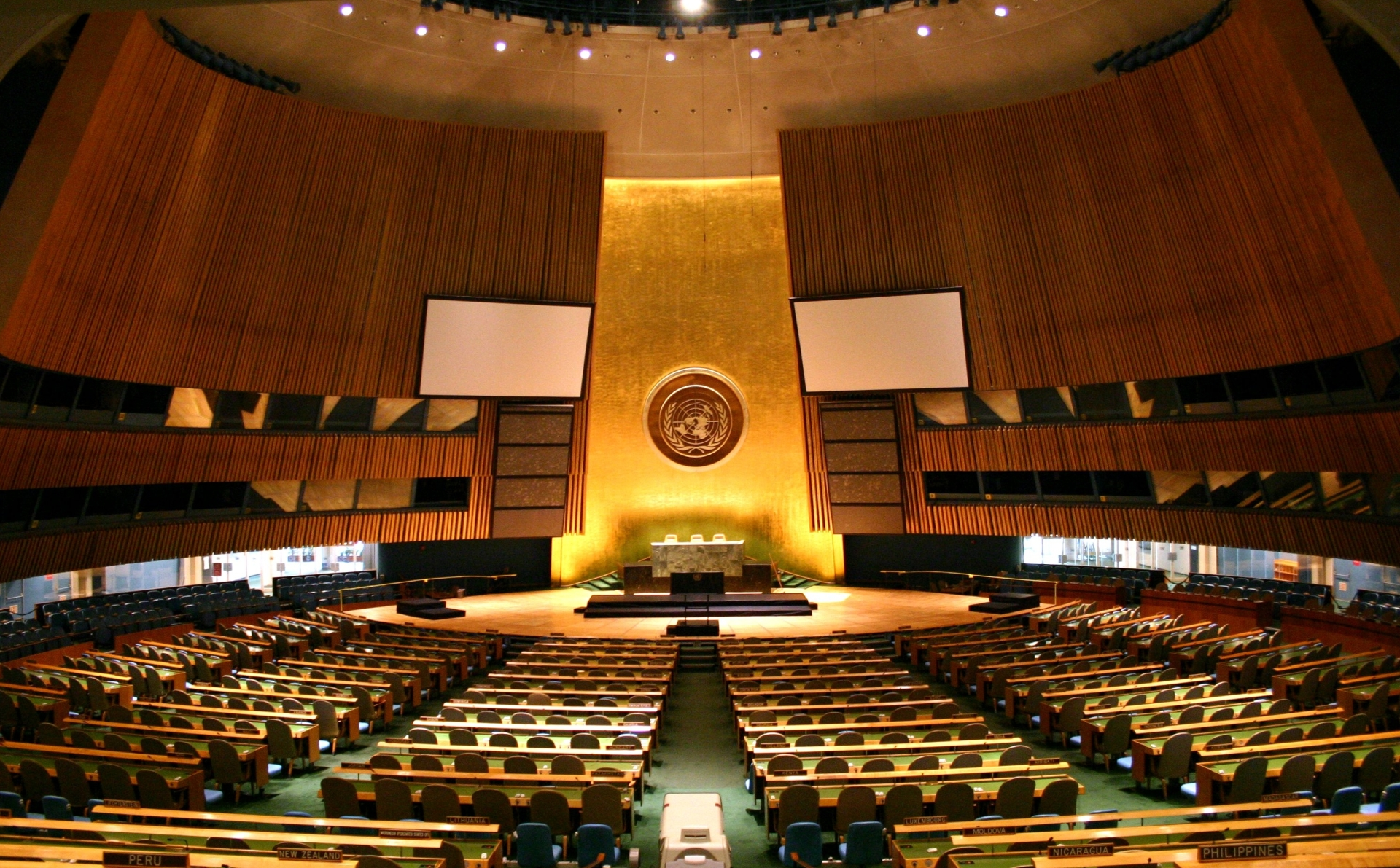
- General Assembly Hall
- Cities: New York City, New York, U.S.
- Venues: General Assembly Hall at the United Nations headquarters
- Participants: United Nations Member States
- Secretary: Dag Hammarskjöld

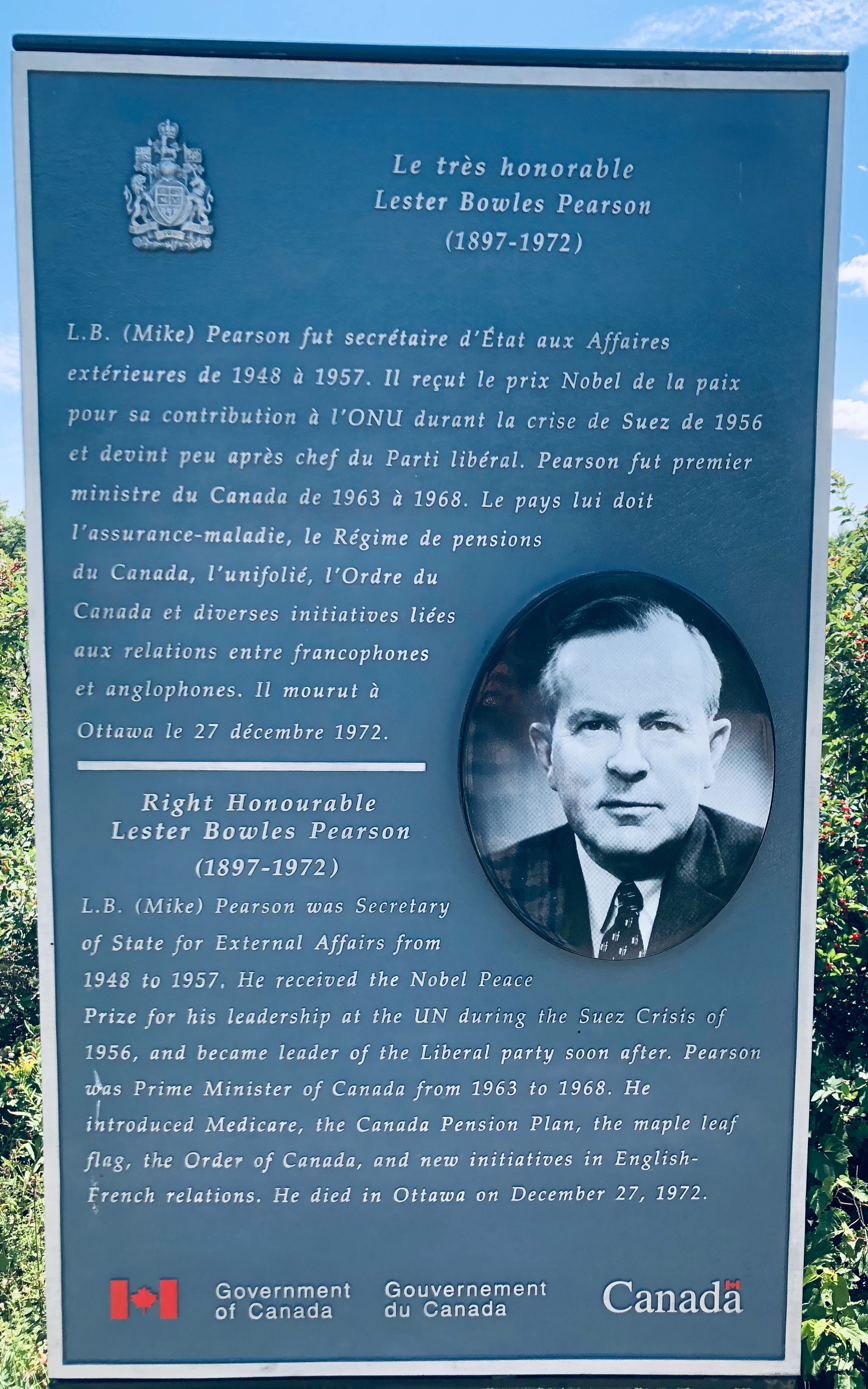
Tribute to Lester Bowles Pearson, who won the 1957 Nobel Peace Prize for his contributions to defuse the Suez crisis

The first emergency special session of the United Nations General Assembly was convened on 1 November and ended on 10 November 1956 resolving the Suez Crisis by creating the United Nations Emergency Force (UNEF) to provide an international presence between the belligerents in the canal zone. The First Emergency Special Session was convened due to the failure of the Security Council to resolve the instability at the Suez Canal. This forced an invocation of the "Uniting for Peace" resolution, which transferred the issue from the Security Council to the General Assembly in its Emergency Special Session (ESS) guise. On the fourth day of the ESS the Canadian representative, Lester B. Pearson, introduced the concept of a UN police force. The creation of the United Nations Emergency Force (the first peacekeeping force) was approved by the General Assembly with 57 supports and zero opposes. The vote had 19 countries abstaining, including the United Kingdom, France, Egypt, the Soviet Union and several Eastern European countries.

== Background ==
The issue developed after years of attacks by Egypt on Israel. Egypt abrogated the Anglo-Egyptian Treaty of 1936, began restricting Israeli shipping, and in 1955 turned to Czechoslovakia to purchase weapons. In July 1956 the United States withdrew financial assistance for Egypt's Aswan Dam project, leading Egypt to nationalize the Suez Canal Company. In September, the Security Council convened to consider "the situation created by the unilateral action of the Egyptian government in bringing to an end the system of international operation of the Suez Canal" and "actions against Egypt by some Powers, particularly France and the United Kingdom, which constitute a danger to international peace and security and are serious violations of the Charter of the United Nations".

In October the Security Council passed Resolution 118 calling on the sovereignty of Egypt to be respected and the operation of the Suez Canal to be insulated from the politics of any country. However, Israel invaded Egypt shortly after. An American draft resolution calling on Israel to withdraw from Egypt to behind armistice lines was vetoed by France and the United Kingdom who joined Israeli forces in the invasion. Security Council Resolution 119 passed on October 31 admitted its failure to maintain international peace and security invoking the 1950 "Uniting for Peace" resolution triggering an emergency special session of the General Assembly.

== Emergency special session ==
On the first day of the special session the General Assembly adopted the American resolution calling for Israel to immediately withdraw its forces from Egypt to behind armistice lines. The measure passed with 64 supports, 5 opposes, and 6 absents — the United Kingdom, France, Israel, Australia, and New Zealand all opposed. Canada abstained, citing a lack of a role for the UN in the peace settlement, which would make the ceasefire only temporary.

At the time the Canadian Minister of External Affairs, Lester B. Pearson was in discussion with the Secretary-General regarding an idea for a UN police force. On 4 November, the Canadian minister introduced the proposal for such a force and a resolution supporting the concept was adopted. The resolution passed with 57 supports and zero opposes, though there were 19 absents including the United Kingdom, France, Egypt, the Soviet Union and several Eastern European countries. On the same day, the Chief of staff at the UN Truce Supervision Organization, E. L. M. Burns, was appointed to head the new force as its Chief of Command. He was authorized to recruit members observer nations of the UNTSO and to pursue further recruitment from other member states, except for permanent members of the Security Council.

On 6 November, the Secretary-General presented a preliminary report to the General Assembly defining the concept and scope of the UNEF and establishing guiding principles. The next day the report was adopted, without any amendments, by a vote count of 64 supports, zero opposes, and 12 absent, including Egypt, Israel, South Africa, the Soviet Union and several Eastern European countries. Both the United Kingdom and France voted in favour because the plan included an international force in the Suez Canal, which they stated was their intention the entire time. The Soviet Union abstained believing it was counter to the Charter of the UN but did not object in order to prevent further aggression against Egypt. An Advisory Committee to implement the plan was formed, consisting of representatives from Brazil, Canada, Sri Lanka, Colombia, India, Norway, and Pakistan, with the Secretary-General as chairman.

The emergency special session ended on 10 November 1956 with the creation of a new UN police force, aka peacekeepers, to separate the two sides. These peacekeepers fit under the United Nations Command.

=== Resolutions ===
- 2 November: Resolution 997 (ES-I): Called for an immediate ceasefire in the Suez Crisis, an arms embargo on the area, and condemned Israel's participation in the conflict as a violation of the 1949 Israel-Egypt General Armistice Agreement.
- 4 November: Resolution 998 (ES-I): Called for the Secretary-General to submit a plan for a United Nations peacekeeping force to secure and supervise a ceasefire in the Suez Crisis.
- 4 November: Resolution 999 (ES-I): Reaffirmed UN General Assembly Resolution 997.
- 5 November: Resolution 1000 (ES-I): Established United Nations Command (UNC) and nominated Commander
- 7 November: Resolution 1001 (ES-I): SG to encourage balanced participation in UNC, established Advisory Committee for UNC
- 7 November: Resolution 1002 (ES-I): Calls for an unconditional Israeli withdrawal from the Sinai.
- 10 November: Resolution 1003 (ES-I): Continues examination of the Suez Crisis in regular GA format.

== See also ==
- Emergency special session of the United Nations General Assembly
- Seventh emergency special session of the United Nations General Assembly
- Tenth emergency special session of the United Nations General Assembly
- List of UN General Assembly sessions
