= United Nations Security Council Resolution 462 =

UN Security Council Resolution 462
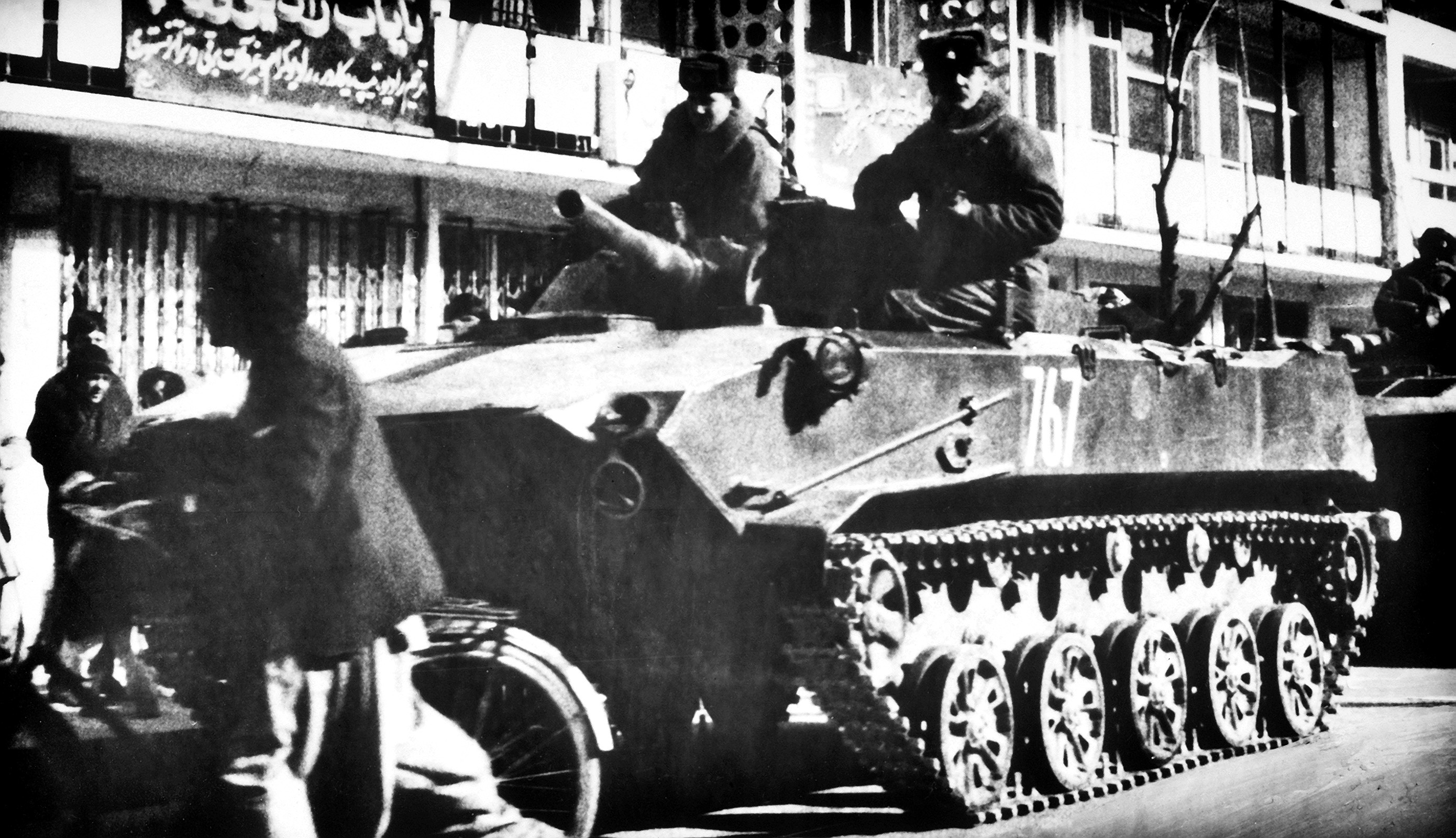
- Soviet paratroopers in Kabul
- Date: 9 January 1980
- Meeting no.: 2,190
- Code: S/RES/462 (Document)
- Subject: International peace and security
- Voting summary: 12 voted for; 2 voted against; 1 abstained
- Result: Adopted

Security Council composition
- Permanent members: China; France; Soviet Union; United Kingdom; United States
- Non-permanent members: Bangladesh; East Germany; Jamaica; Mexico; Niger; Norway; Philippines; Portugal; Tunisia; Zambia

United Nations Security Council resolution 462, adopted on 9 January 1980, after considering an item on the agenda of the council and given the lack of unanimity amongst its permanent members, the council decided to call an emergency meeting of the United Nations General Assembly to discuss the Soviet invasion of Afghanistan.

Two days prior to the adoption of Resolution 462, a previous draft resolution had been vetoed by the Soviet Union. During the discussions of the draft resolution, some members of the council highlighted the serious nature of the situation and that it justified a general assembly debate.

"The Security Council, Having considered the item on the agenda of its 2185th meeting, as contained in document S/Agenda/ 2185, Taking into account that the lack of unanimity of its permanent members at the 2190th meeting has prevented it from exercising its primary responsibility for the maintenance of international peace and security, decides to call an emergency special session of the General Assembly to examine the question contained in document S/Agenda/2185."

The resolution was adopted by 12 votes to two against (East Germany, Soviet Union) with one abstention from Zambia.

Following the resolution, the Sixth emergency special session of the United Nations General Assembly took place, as indicated by the resolution.

== See also ==
- List of United Nations Security Council Resolutions 401 to 500 (1976–1982)
- 'Uniting for Peace' Resolution
