= United Nations Security Council Resolution 500 =

UN Security Council Resolution 500
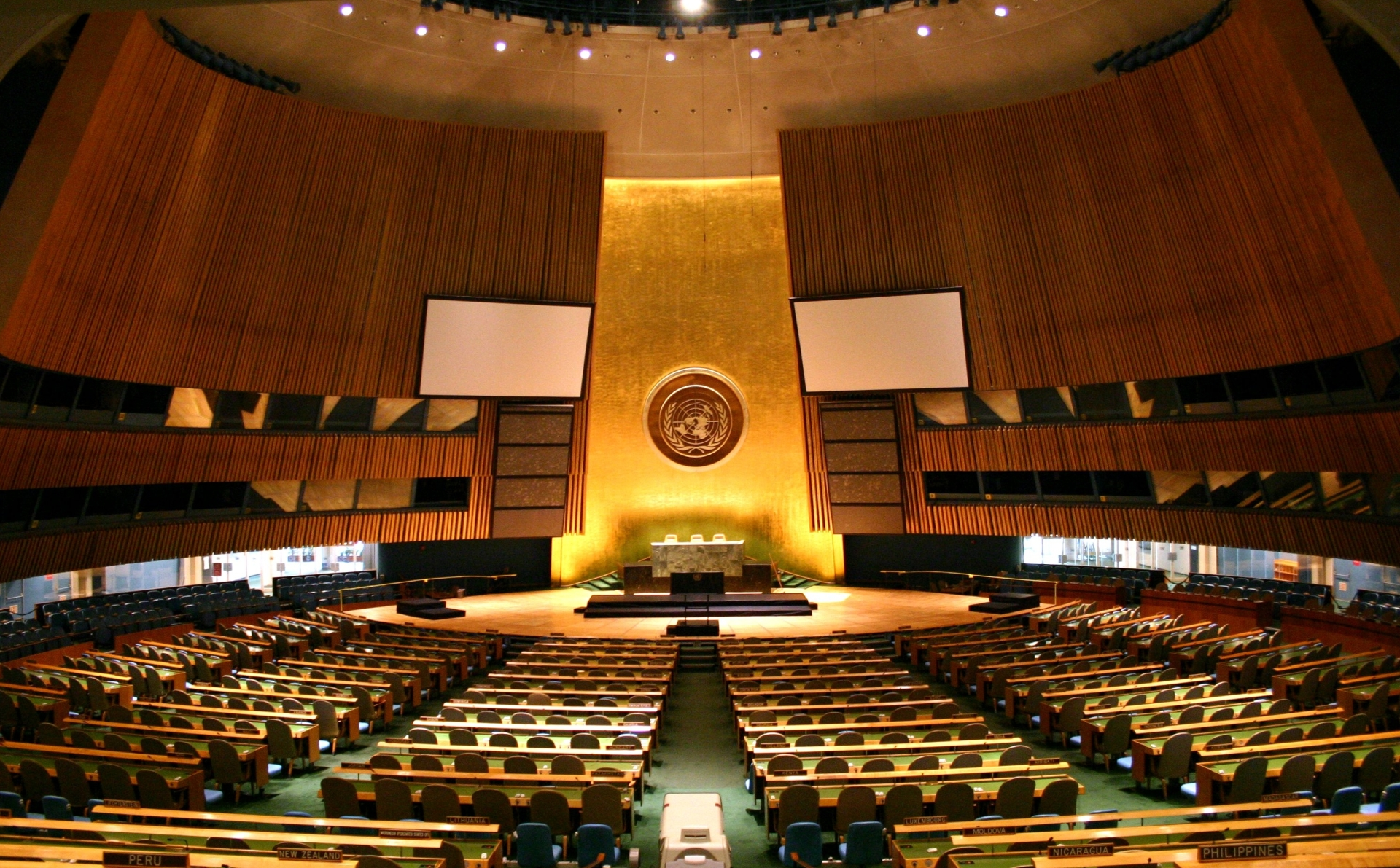
- General Assembly
- Date: 28 January 1982
- Meeting no.: 2,330
- Code: S/RES/500 (Document)
- Subject: International peace and security
- Voting summary: 13 voted for; None voted against; 2 abstained
- Result: Adopted

Security Council composition
- Permanent members: China; France; Soviet Union; United Kingdom; United States
- Non-permanent members: Guyana; Ireland; Jordan; Japan; Panama; Poland; Spain; Togo; Uganda; Zaire

United Nations Security Council resolution 500, adopted on 28 January 1982, after considering an item on the agenda of the council and given the lack of unanimity amongst its permanent members, the council decided to call an emergency meeting of the United Nations General Assembly to discuss the Israeli occupation of the Golan Heights.

The resolution, which was previously vetoed by the United States on 20 January 1982, was adopted by 13 votes to none with two abstentions from the United Kingdom and United States.

Following the resolution, the Ninth emergency special session of the United Nations General Assembly took place.

== See also ==
- Arab–Israeli conflict
- Golan Heights
- Israel–Syria relations
- List of United Nations Security Council Resolutions 401 to 500 (1976–1982)
- 'Uniting for Peace' Resolution
