= Third emergency special session of the United Nations General Assembly =

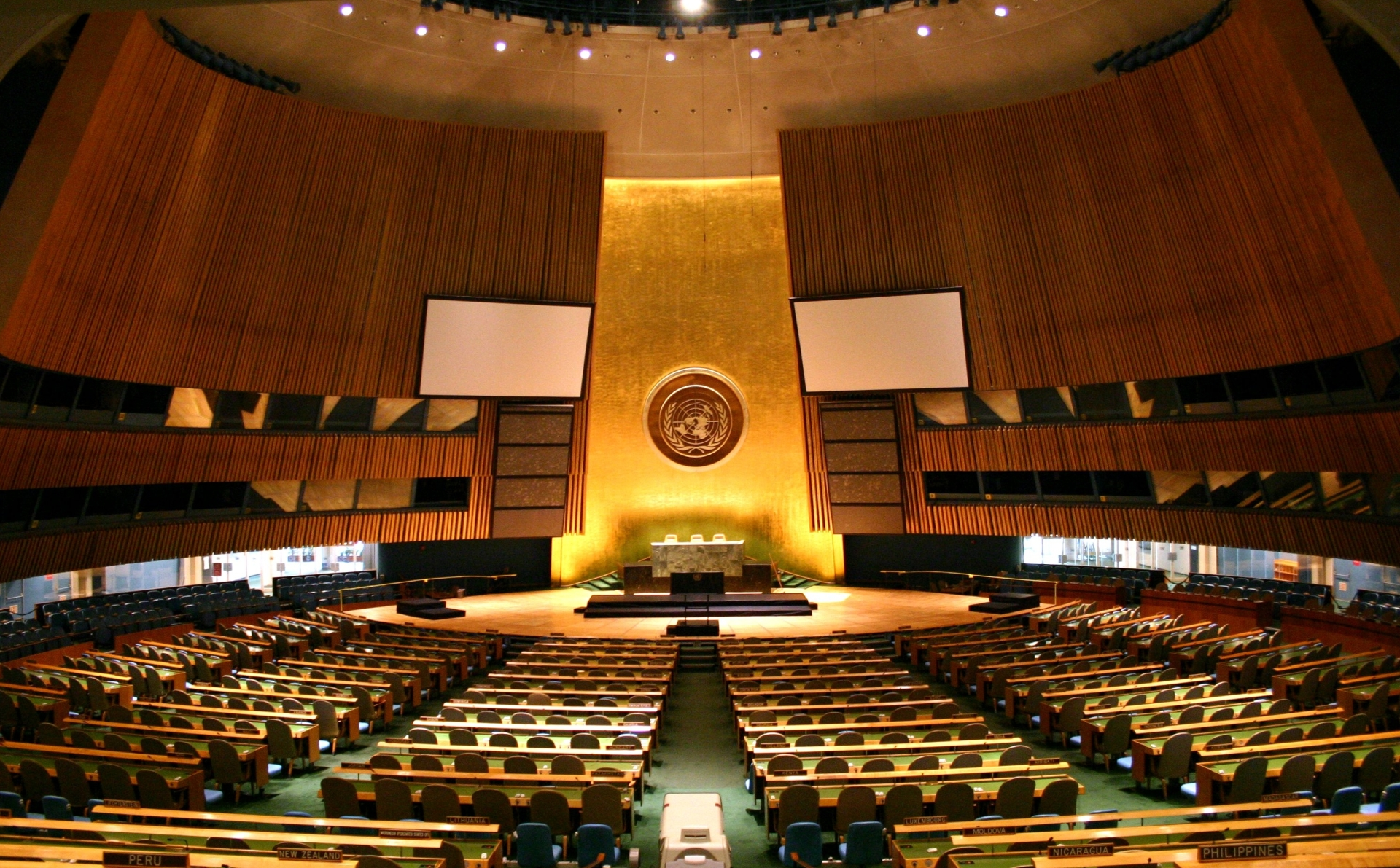
- General Assembly Hall
- Cities: New York City, New York, U.S.
- Venues: General Assembly Hall at the United Nations headquarters
- Participants: United Nations Member States
- Secretary: Dag Hammarskjöld

The Third emergency special session of the United Nations General Assembly was invoked by the UN Security Council's Resolution 129. Sitting in August 1958, the Third Emergency Special Session on "The Situation in the Middle East" adopted Resolution 1237 (ES-III) calling for early withdrawal of foreign troops from Jordan and Lebanon.
