= Fifth emergency special session of the United Nations General Assembly =

1967 session of the United Nations General Assembly

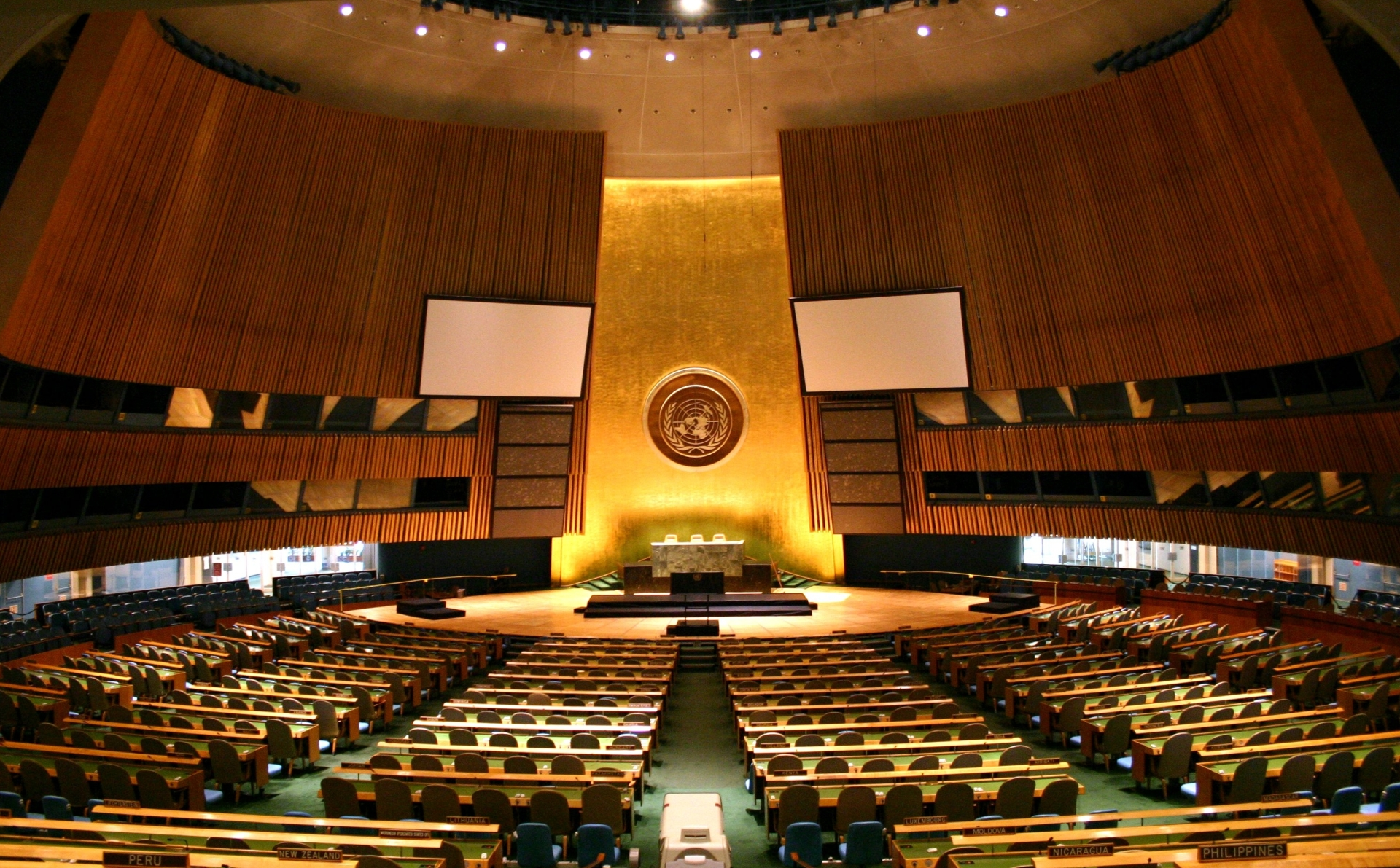
- General Assembly Hall
- Cities: New York City, New York, U.S.
- Venues: General Assembly Hall at the United Nations headquarters
- Participants: United Nations Member States
- Secretary: U Thant

The Fifth emergency special session of the United Nations General Assembly (UNGA) was invoked in 1967 by the UNGA at the request of the USSR (A/6717) and voted 98-3-3. It adopted six resolutions, including Resolutions 2253 (ES-V) and Resolution 2254 (ES-V) calling on Israel to rescind unilateral measures in Jerusalem.

== See also ==
- List of UN General Assembly sessions
