= United Nations Emergency Force =

1956 UN peacekeeping force in Egypt

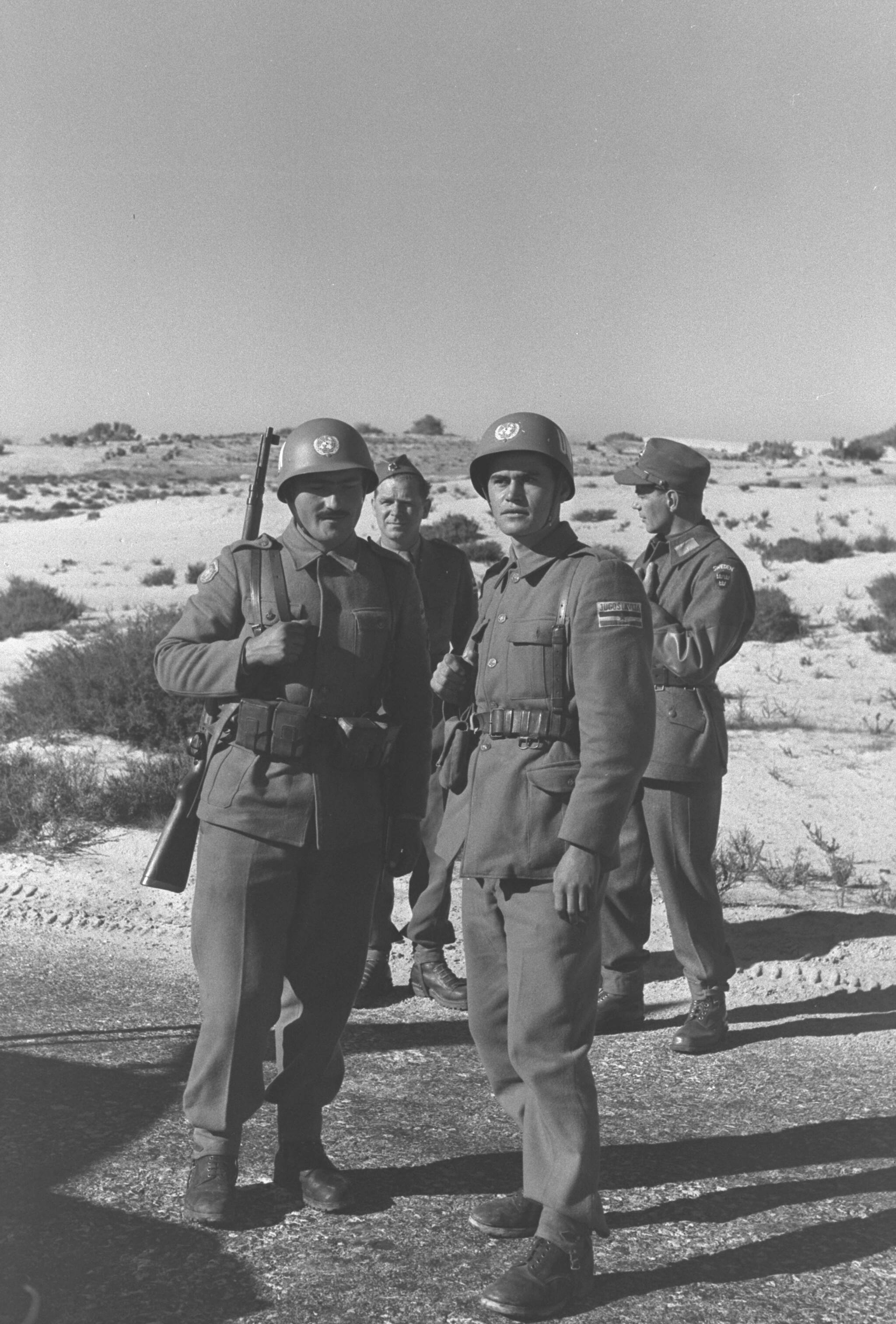
- UNEF soldiers from the Yugoslav People's Army in Sinai, January 1957
- Active: November 7, 1956–June 17, 1967
- Branch: United Nations peacekeeping
- Part of: United Nations
- Patron: Dag Hammarskjöld; Lester Pearson
- Colors: Blue; White
- Engagements: Arab–Israeli conflict; Suez Crisis
- Decorations: UN Emergency Force Medal

The United Nations Emergency Force (UNEF) was a military and peacekeeping operation established by the United Nations General Assembly to secure an end to the Suez Crisis of 1956 through the establishment of international peacekeepers on the border between Egypt and Israel. Approved by Resolution 1001 (ES-I) of 7 November 1956, the UNEF was developed in large measure as a result of efforts by UN secretary-general Dag Hammarskjöld and a proposal from Canadian Minister of External Affairs Lester B. Pearson, who would later win the Nobel Peace Prize for it. UNEF was deployed along Sinai and Gaza until May 1967, when Egypt requested UNEF to withdraw its forces.

The UN General Assembly later established the UN Emergency Force II to supervise the ceasefire between Egyptian and Israeli forces at the end of the Yom Kippur War.

== History ==
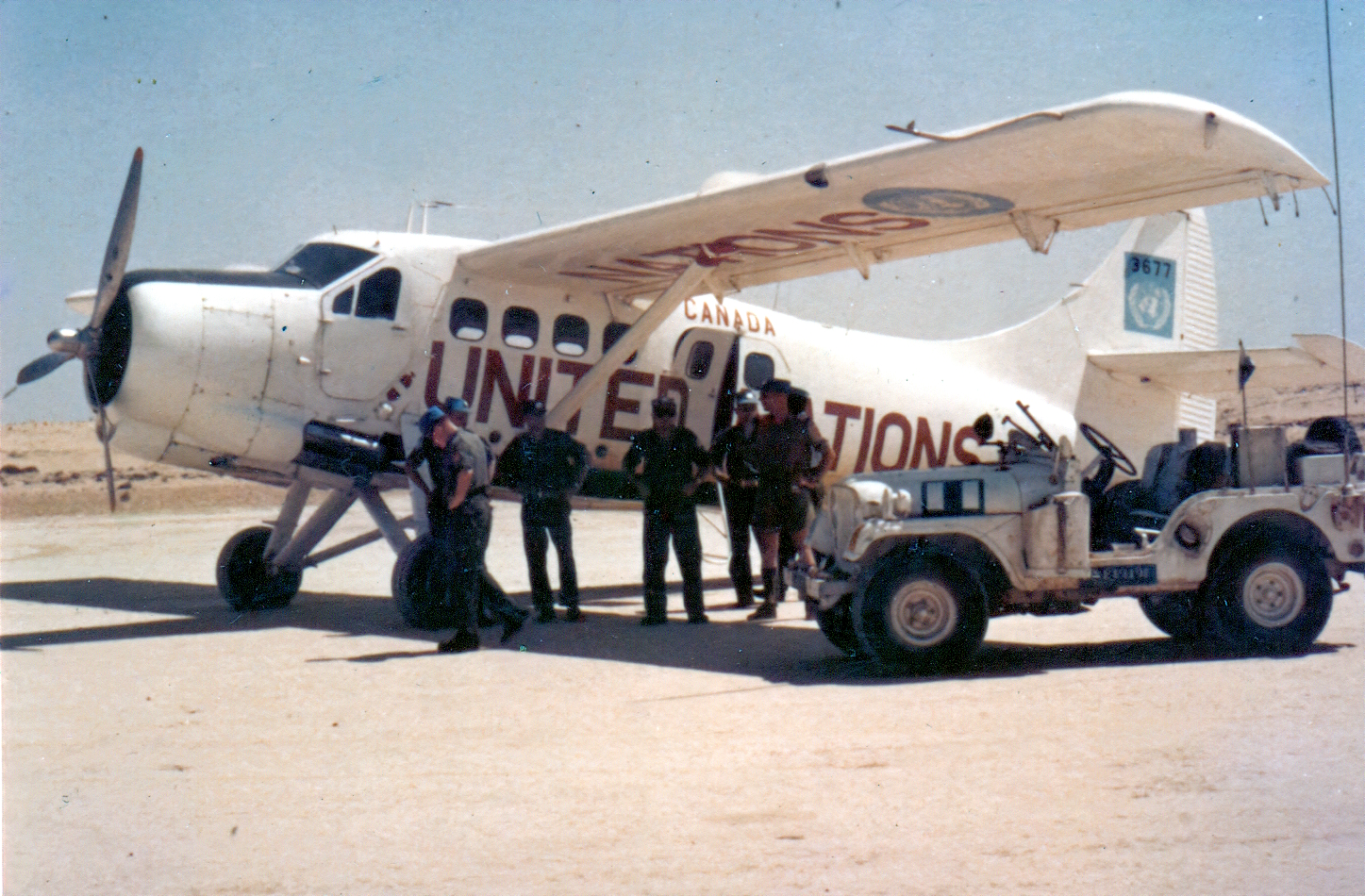
F/L Lynn Garrison crew with UNEF DHC-3 Otter, Sinai, 1962

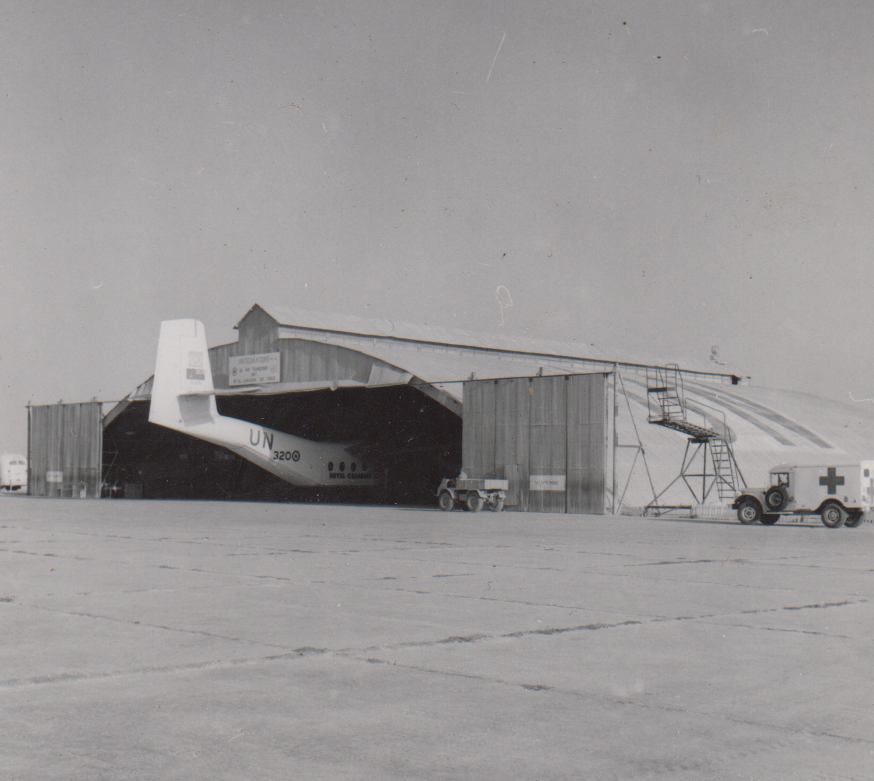
UNEF DHC-4 Caribou at El Arish, 1962

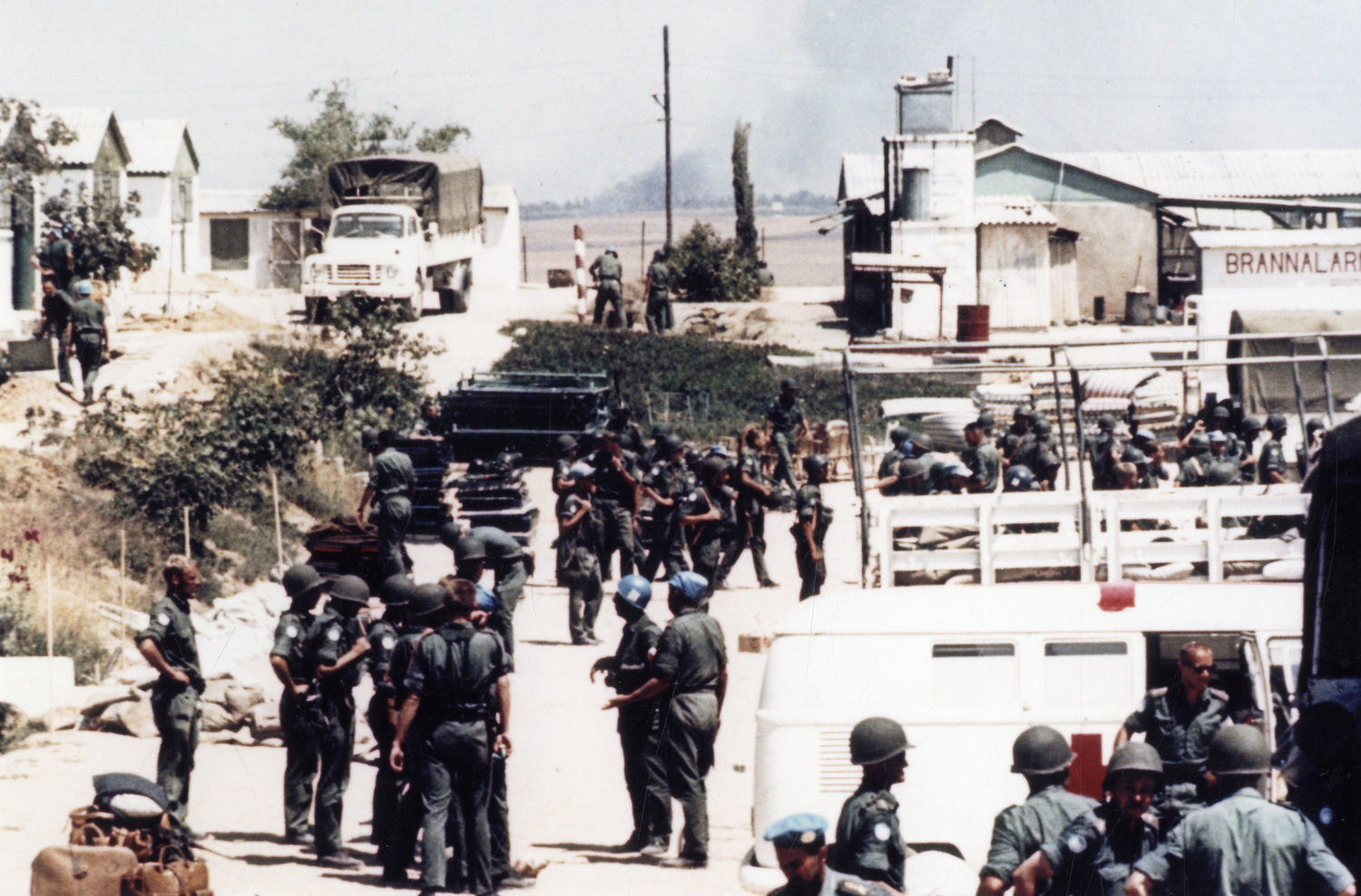
Swedish peacekeepers evacuating their position at Hill 88 during the Six-Day War

The first UN military force of its kind, UNEF's mission was to:

... enter Egyptian territory with the consent of the Egyptian Government, in order to help maintain quiet during and after the withdrawal of non-Egyptian forces and to secure compliance with the other terms established in the resolution ... to cover an area extending roughly from the Suez Canal to the Armistice Demarcation Lines established in the Armistice Agreement between Egypt and Israel.

UNEF was formed under the authority of the General Assembly and was subject to the national sovereignty clause, Article 2, Paragraph 7, of the U.N. Charter. An agreement between the Egyptian government and the Secretary-General, The Good Faith Accords, or Good Faith Aide-Memoire, placed the UNEF force in Egypt with the consent of the Egyptian government.

Since the operative UN resolutions were not passed under Chapter VII of the United Nations Charter, the planned deployment of a military forces had to be approved by Egypt and Israel. After multilateral negotiations with Egypt, eleven countries offered to contribute to a force on the Egyptian side of the armistice line: Brazil, Canada, Colombia, Denmark, Finland, India, Indonesia, Norway, Sweden, and Yugoslavia. Support was also provided by United States, Italy, and Switzerland. The first forces arrived in Cairo on 15 November, and UNEF was at its full force of 6,000 by February 1957. The force was fully deployed in designated areas around the canal, in the Sinai and Gaza when Israel withdrew its last forces from Rafah on 8 March 1957. The UN Secretary-General sought to station UNEF forces on the Israeli side of the 1949 armistice lines, but this was rejected by Israel.

The mission was directed to be accomplished in four phases:

1. In November and December 1956, the force facilitated the orderly transition in the Suez Canal area when British and French forces left.
2. From December 1956 to March 1957, the force facilitated the separation of Israeli and Egyptian forces and the Israeli evacuation from all areas captured during the war, except Gaza and Sharm-el-Sheik.
3. In March 1957, the force facilitated the departure of Israeli forces from Gaza and Sharm-el-Sheik.
4. Deployment along the borders for purposes of observation. This phase ended in May 1967.

Due to financial constraints and changing needs, the force shrank through the years to 3,378 by May 1967.

On 16 May 1967, the Egyptian government ordered all United Nations forces – at the time, composed mostly of military contingents from Brazil, Canada, and India, with a smaller Swedish contingent – out of Sinai. Secretary-General U Thant tried to redeploy UNEF to areas on the Israeli side of the border, in order to maintain a buffer, but this was rejected by Israel.

By 31 May, the Canadian contingent had already been completely evacuated by air, with the Brazilian, Indian and Swedish contingents still preparing for evacuation, when Israel invaded Egypt on 5 June 1967, starting the Six-Day War. In different episodes, Israeli forces attacked a UNEF convoy, camps in which UNEF personnel were concentrated and the UNEF headquarters in Gaza. In these episodes, one Brazilian peacekeeper and 14 Indian officials were killed by Israeli forces, with an additional seventeen wounded in both contingents.

The last United Nations peacekeeper left the region on 17 June.

== Casualties ==
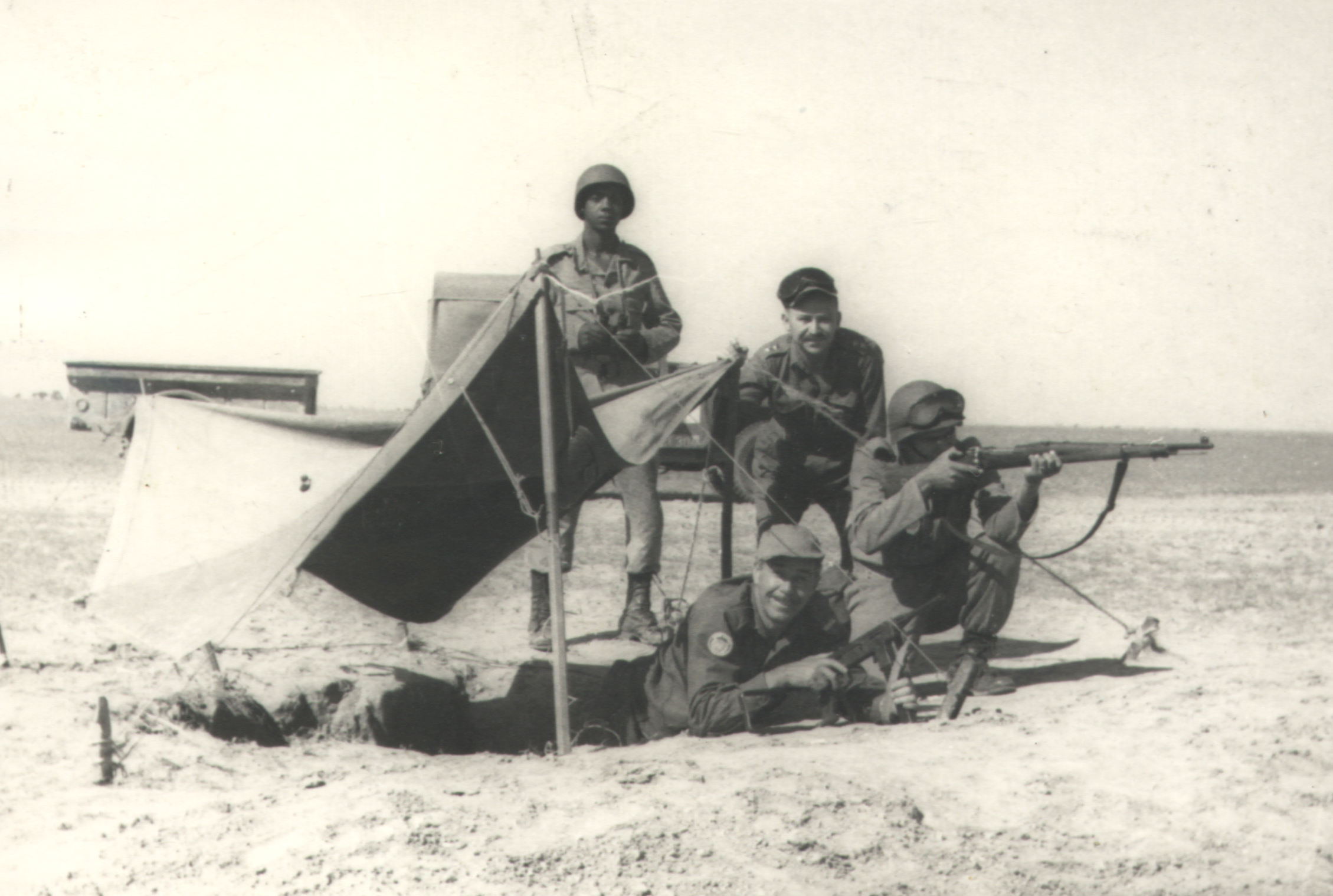
Brazilian Army UNEF soldiers in the Sinai

The Brazilian peacekeeper killed by Israeli forces was Sergeant Adalberto Ilha de Macedo. The Indian members of UNEF killed in the Israeli attacks were: Captain Vijay Sachar, Subahdar Ajit Singh, Sepoy Sohan Singh, Sepoy Joginder Singh, Sepoy Pritam Singh, Sepoy Sadhu Singh, Sepoy Mohinder Singh, Bandsman Gopal Singh, Sepoy Mukhtiar Singh, L/Naik Sulakhan Singh, Sepoy Jit Singh, Sepoy G. K. Kutty, Nce Sona Baitha, and Sepoy Zora Singh.

== Force commanders ==
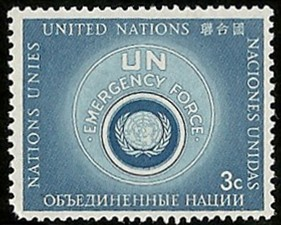
UNEF postage stamp

Stationed in Gaza City, Gaza Strip.

- Nov. 1956 – Dec. 1959 Lieutenant-General E. L. M. Burns (Canada)
- Dec. 1959 – Jan. 1964 Lieutenant-General P. S. Gyani (India)
- Jan. 1964 – Aug. 1964 Major-General Carlos F. Paiva Chaves (Brazil)
- Aug. 1964 – Jan. 1965 Colonel Lazar Mušicki (Yugoslavia) (Acting)
- Jan. 1965 – Jan. 1966 Major-General Syseno Sarmento (Brazil)
- Jan. 1966 – June 1967 Major-General Indar Jit Rikhye (India)

== Contributing countries ==
Contributors of military personnel were: Brazil, Canada, Colombia, Denmark, Finland, India, Indonesia, Norway, Sweden, and Yugoslavia.

== Gallery ==
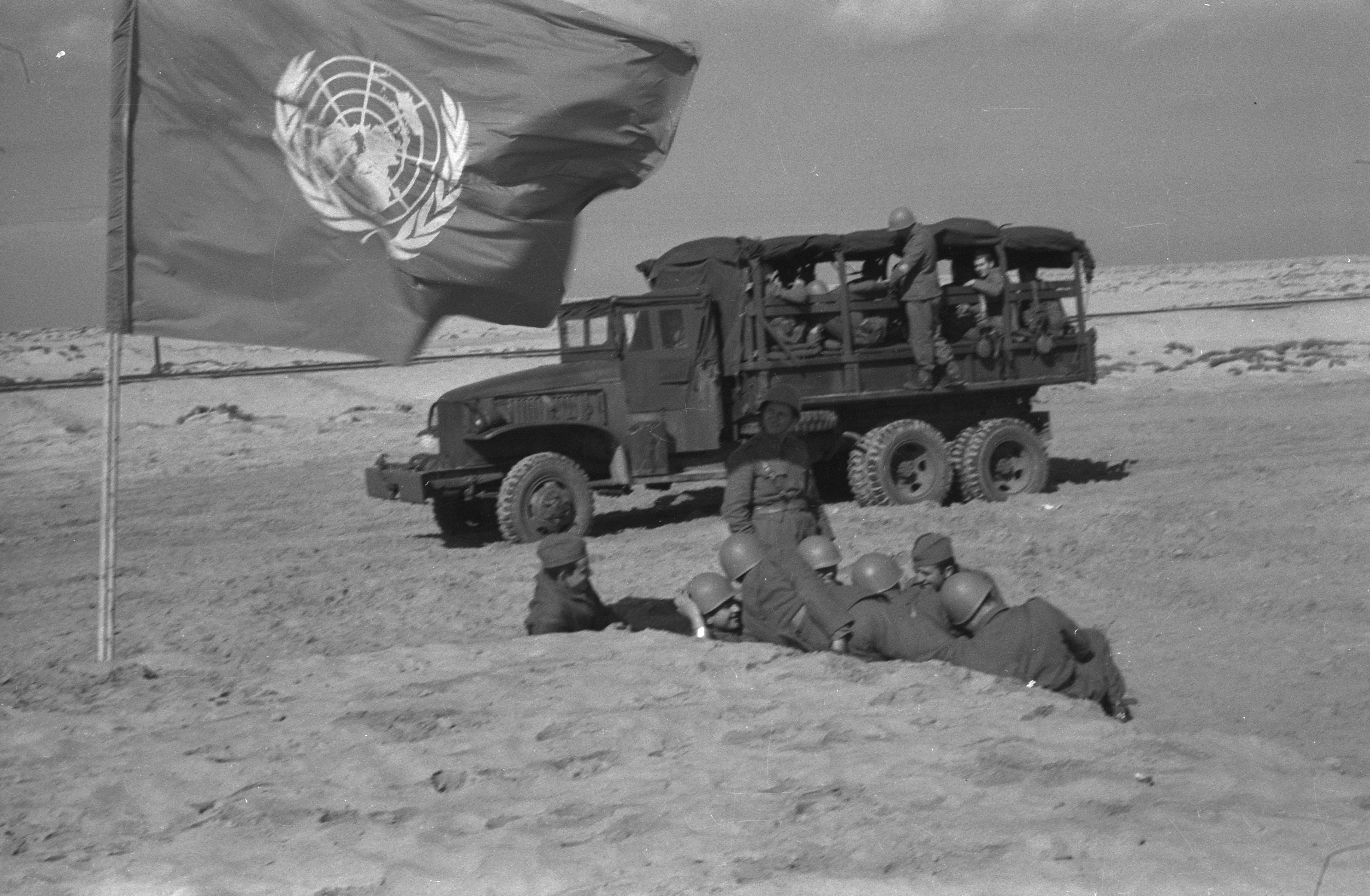
UNEF soldiers resting

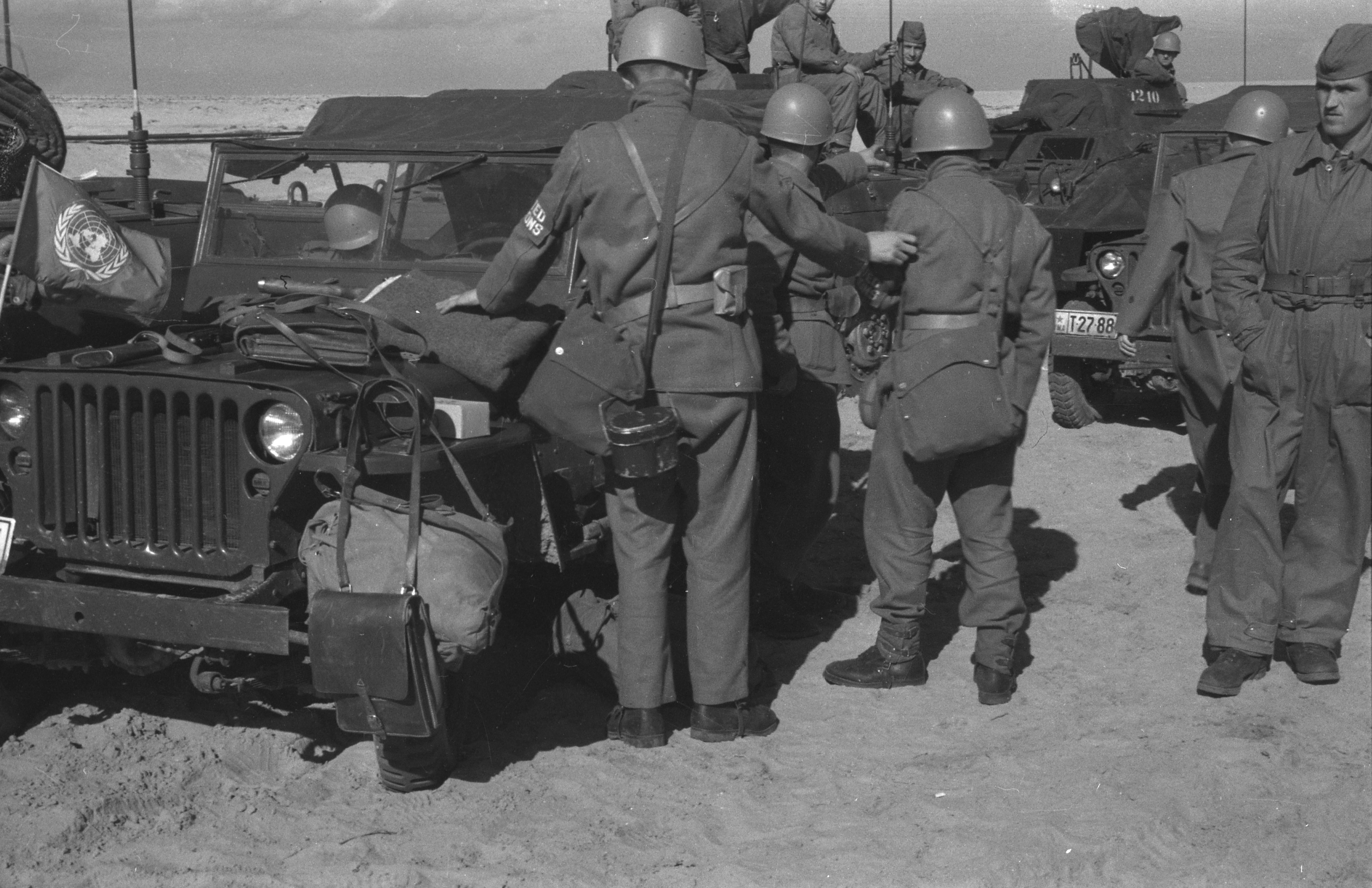
UNEF soldiers in Sinai

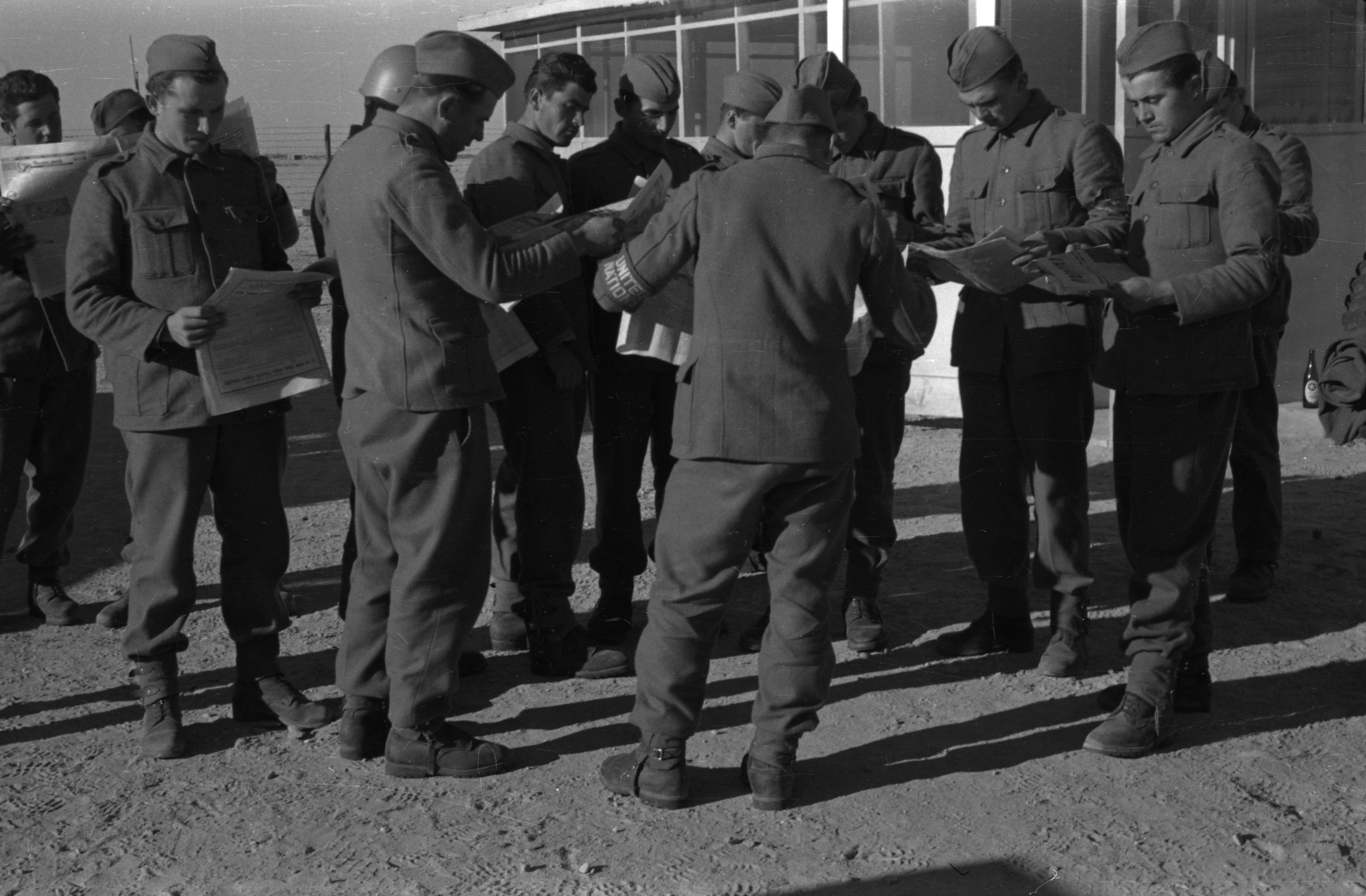
UNEF soldiers reading newspapers

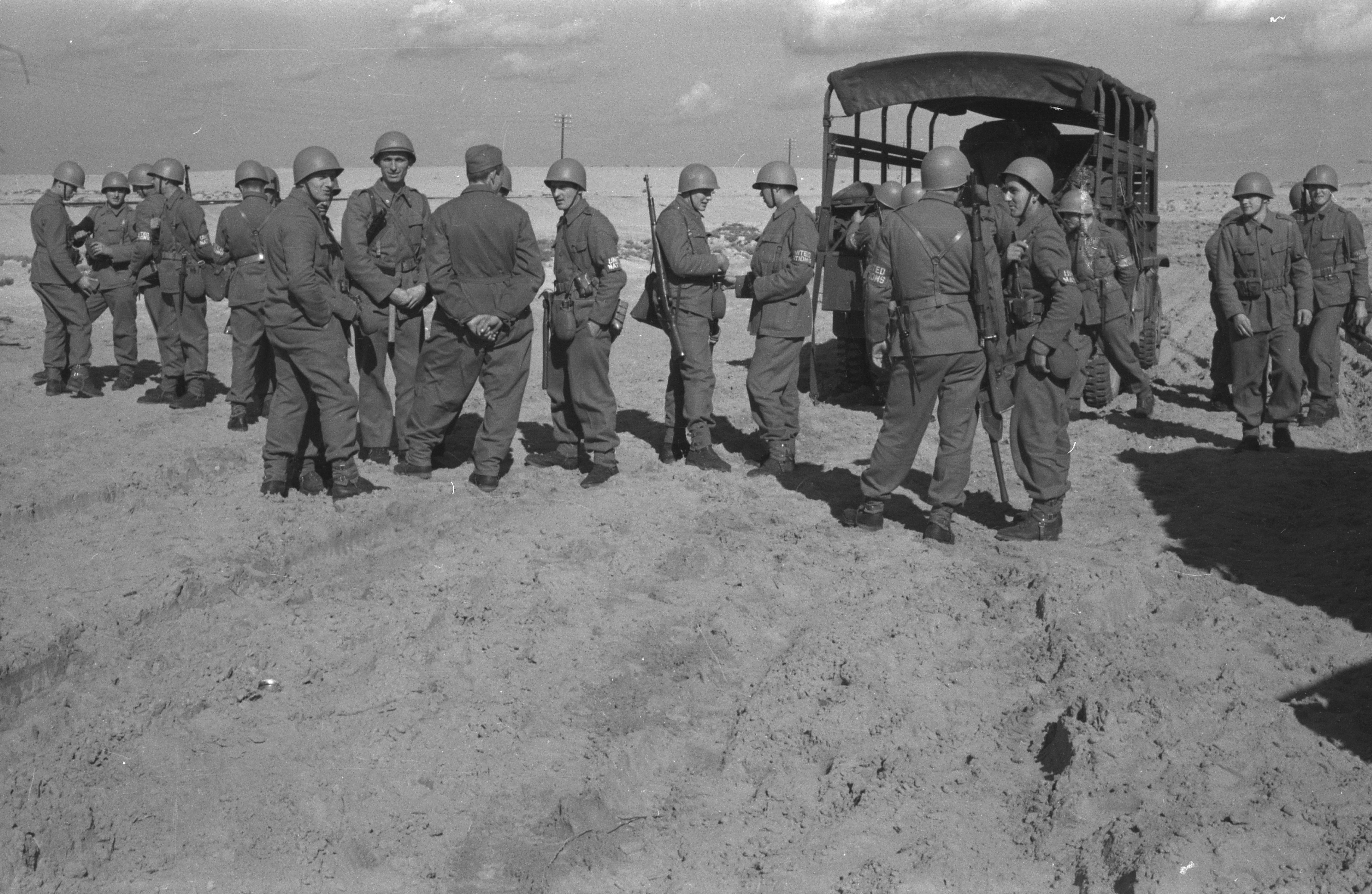
UNEF soldiers in Sinai

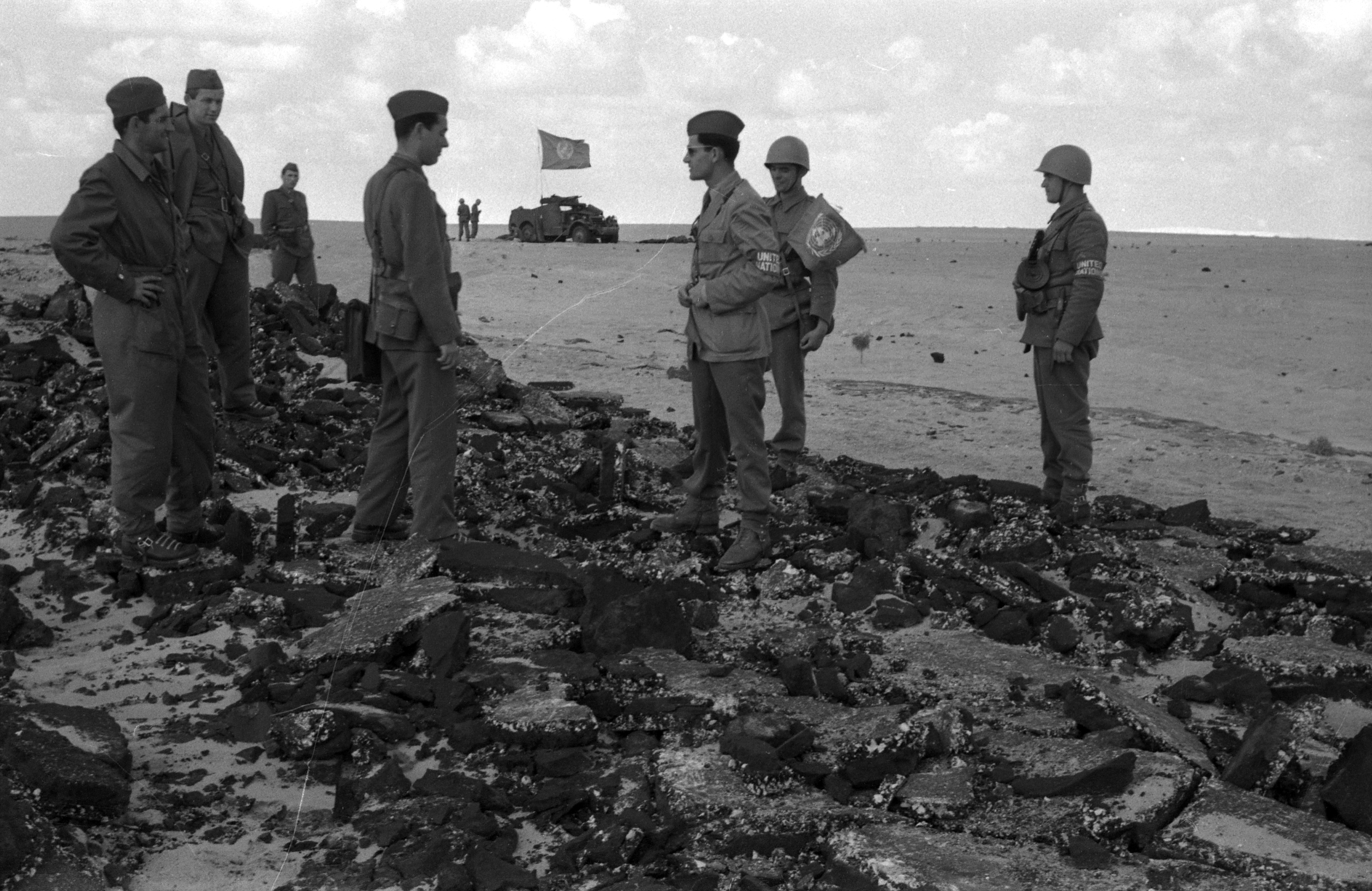
UNEF soldiers in Sinai

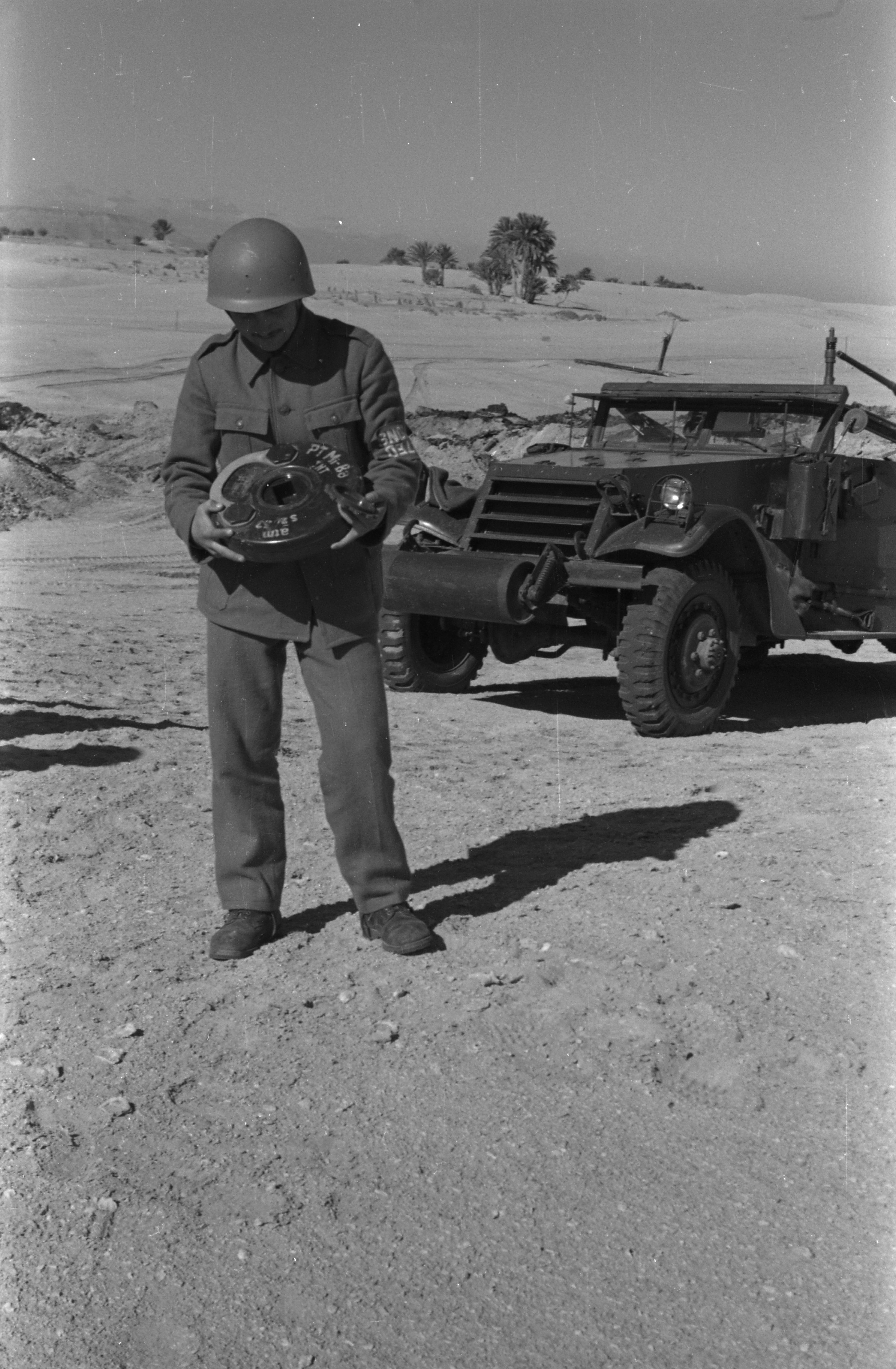
UNEF soldier with a land mine

== See also ==
- Multinational Force and Observers, a somewhat similar, but smaller force instituted to ensure enforcement of the Egyptian–Israeli Peace Treaty
- Second United Nations Emergency Force
- United Nations Security Council Resolution 340
- United Nations Truce Supervision Organization
- Yom Kippur War
