= United Nations Security Council Resolution 119 =

1956 resolution regarding Egypt

UN Security Council Resolution 119
- Date: 31 October 1956
- Meeting no.: 751
- Code: S/3721 (Document)
- Subject: Complaint by Egypt against France and the United Kingdom
- Voting summary: 7 voted for; 2 voted against; 2 abstained
- Result: Adopted

Security Council composition
- Permanent members: China; France; Soviet Union; United Kingdom; United States
- Non-permanent members: Australia; Belgium; Cuba; Iran; Peru; Yugoslavia

United Nations Security Council Resolution 119 was proposed by the United States on 31 October 1956. Considering the grave situation created by action undertaken against Egypt and the lack of unanimity of its permanent members at previous meetings, the Council felt it had been prevented from exercising its responsibility for the maintenance of international peace and security. As a solution, the Council decided to call an emergency special session of the General Assembly in order to make appropriate recommendations.

Even though France and United Kingdom voted "against" they could not block the summoning of the General Assembly as it was a procedural vote, which cannot be vetoed by permanent members.

== See also ==
- List of United Nations Security Council Resolutions 101 to 200 (1953–1965)
- Protocol of Sèvres
- Suez Crisis
