= Ninth emergency special session of the United Nations General Assembly =

1982 session of the United Nations General Assembly

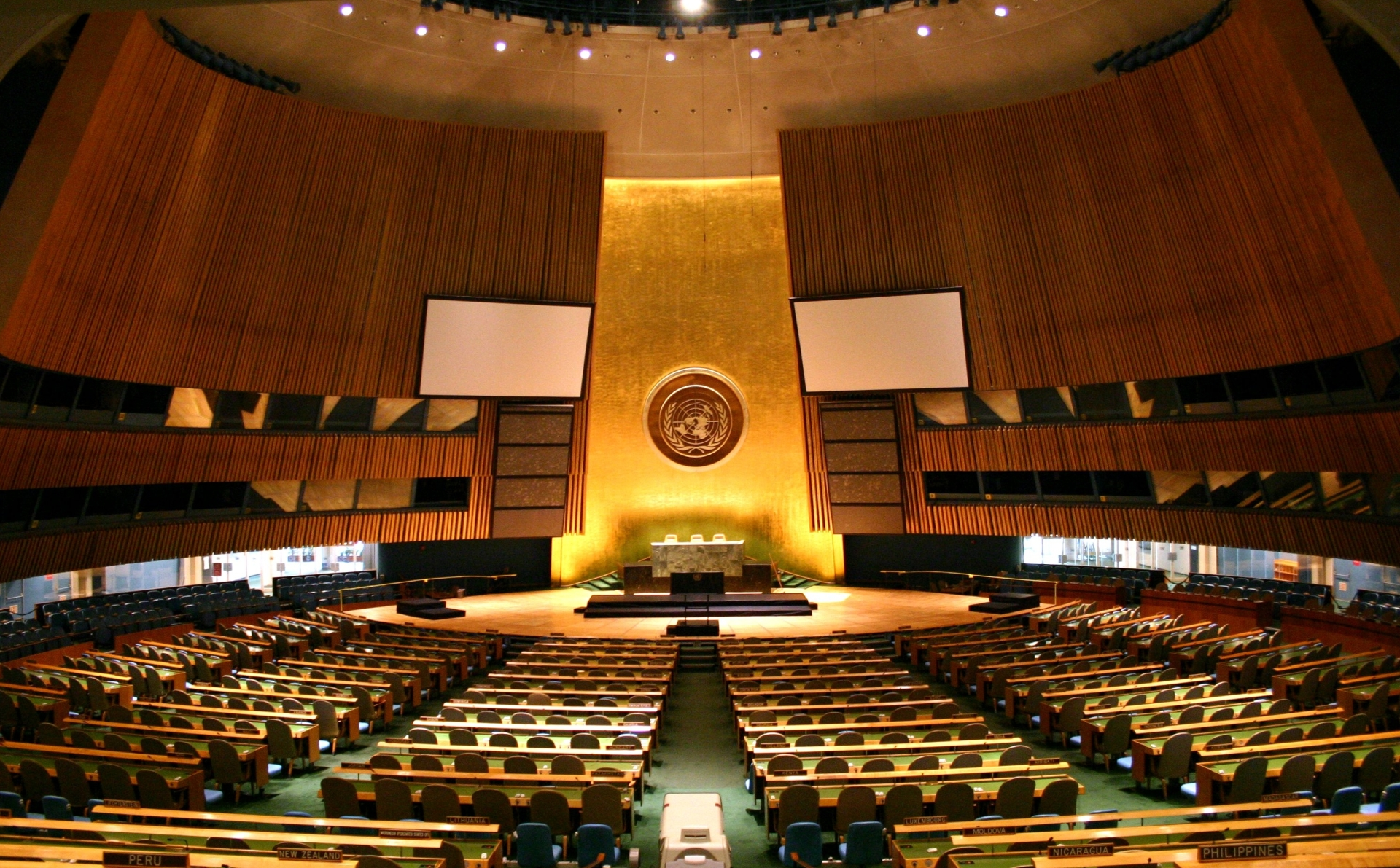
- General Assembly Hall
- Cities: New York City, New York, U.S.
- Venues: General Assembly Hall at the United Nations headquarters
- Participants: United Nations Member States
- President: Various

The Ninth emergency special session of the United Nations General Assembly (UNGA) was invoked in 1982 by the UN Security Council's Resolution 500. The Ninth Emergency Special Session on "The Situation in the Middle East" in view of the conflict in the Golan Heights adopted Resolution ES-9/1 declaring Israel a non-peace-loving state and calling on members to apply a number of measures on Israel.

== See also ==
- List of UN General Assembly sessions
