= Tenth emergency special session of the United Nations General Assembly =

1997–present session on the Israeli–Palestinian conflict

- Ongoing since 1997
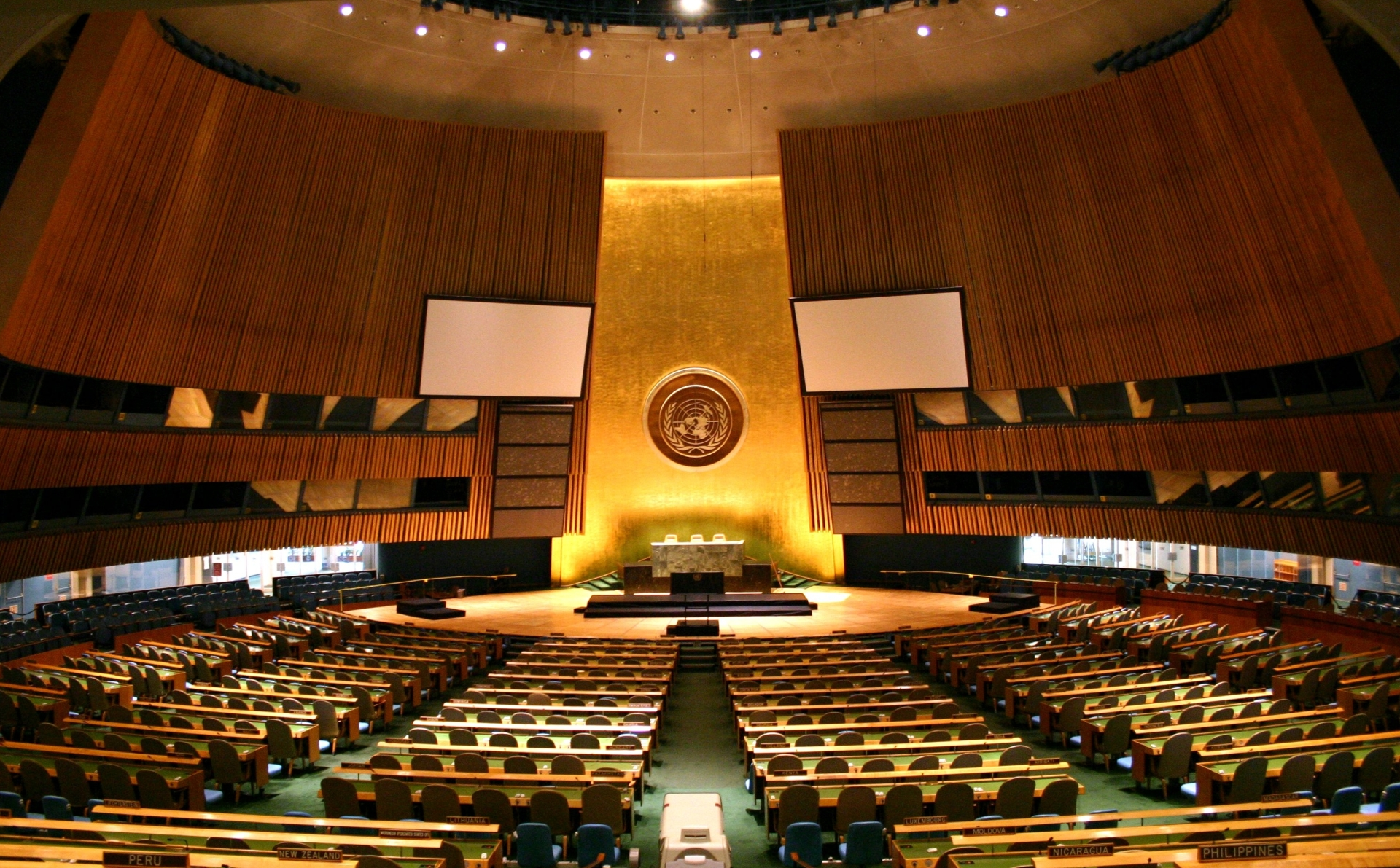
- General Assembly Hall (2006)
- Cities: New York City, New York, U.S.
- Venues: General Assembly Hall at the United Nations headquarters
- Participants: United Nations Member States
- President: Various, began with Razali Ismail
- Secretary: Kofi Annan
- Website: un.org/en/ga/sessions/emergency10th

The tenth emergency special session of the United Nations General Assembly centred on the Israeli–Palestinian conflict: the ongoing occupation of the West Bank and the Gaza Strip. The session was first convened in 1997 under the president of the General Assembly, Razali Ismail of Malaysia. This occurred when the Security Council failed to make a decision on the issue at two different meetings. The session is currently ongoing as of October 26, 2023.

An emergency special session (ESS) is an unscheduled meeting of the United Nations General Assembly to make urgent, but non-binding decisions or recommendations regarding a particular issue. They are rare—a fact reflected in there having been only eleven convened in the history of the United Nations, as of April 2022.

Most emergency special sessions span a single sitting—the tenth is the first ESS to have been resumed more than once (the seventh emergency special session was resumed exactly once). Indeed, more than ten separate 'meetings' have been held by the Assembly, whilst sitting in the tenth ESS, since 2000. The fact that the tenth has spanned so many sittings can be seen as an indicator of the importance of the issue in international politics. It has, so far, seen over 30 meetings held (see UN documents A/ES-10/PV.1 to A/ES-10/PV.31), nearly every year from 1997 through 2009. The most recent is currently ongoing as of October 26, 2023.

The mechanism of the emergency special session was created in 1950 by the General Assembly's adoption of its 'Uniting for Peace' resolution, which made the necessary changes to the Assembly's 'Rules of Procedure' at that time. The resolution likewise declared that:

... if the Security Council, because of lack of unanimity of the permanent members, fails to exercise its primary responsibility for the maintenance of international peace and security in any case where there appears to be a threat to the peace, breach of the peace, or act of aggression, the General Assembly shall consider the matter immediately with a view to making appropriate recommendations to Members for collective measures, including in the case of a breach of the peace or act of aggression the use of armed force when necessary, to maintain or restore international peace and security. If not in session at the time, the General Assembly may meet in emergency special session within twenty-four hours of the request therefor. Such emergency special session shall be called if requested by the Security Council on the vote of any seven members, or by a majority of the Members of the United Nations...

== See also ==
- Emergency special session of the United Nations General Assembly
- Israel and the United Nations
- United Nations General Assembly Resolution ES-10/21
- United Nations General Assembly Resolution ES-10/22
- United Nations General Assembly Resolution ES-10/23
