= Second emergency special session of the United Nations General Assembly =

1956 session of the United Nations General Assembly

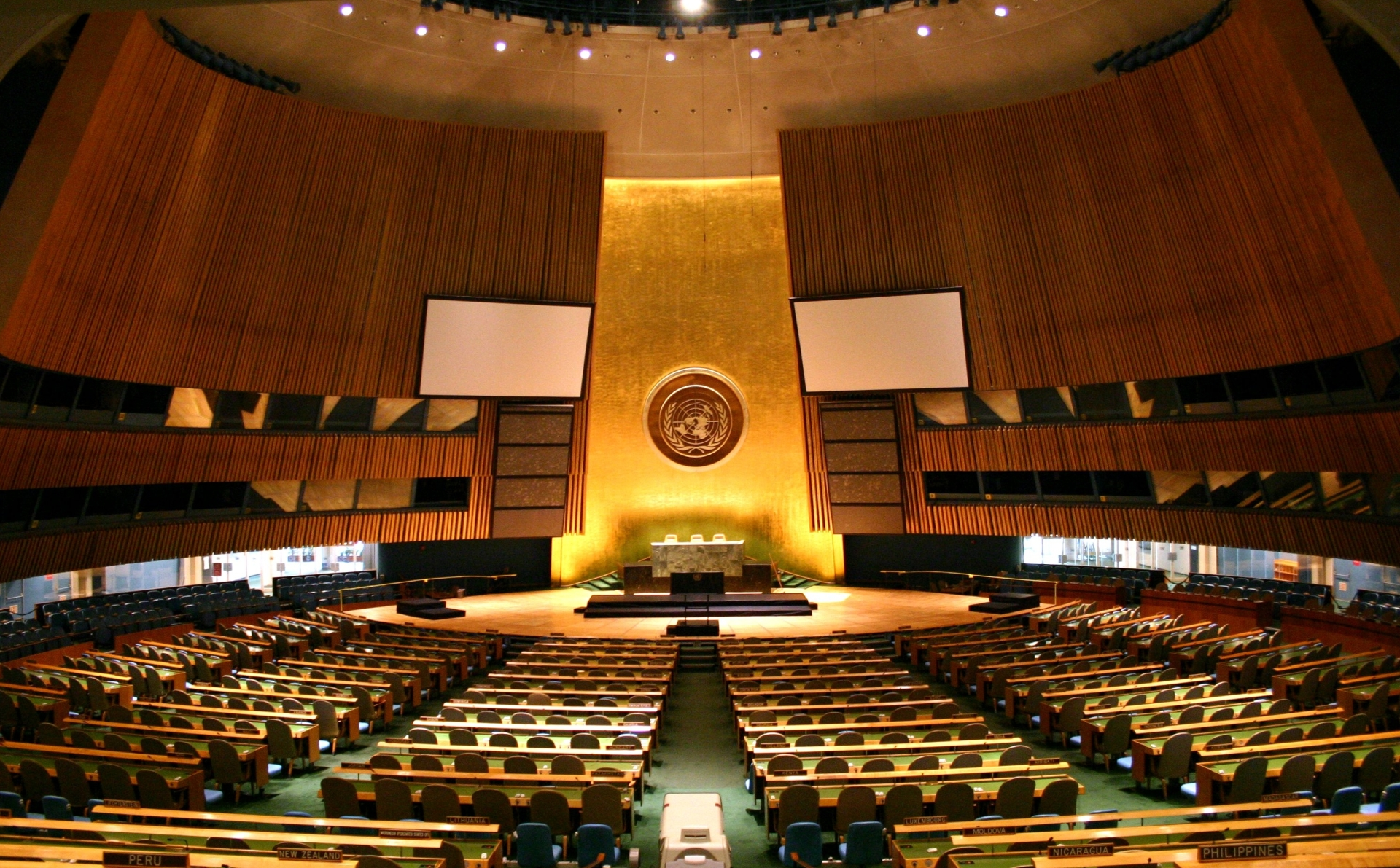
- General Assembly Hall
- Cities: New York City, New York, U.S.
- Venues: General Assembly Hall at the United Nations headquarters
- Participants: United Nations Member States
- Secretary: Dag Hammarskjöld

The Second emergency special session of the United Nations General Assembly (UNGA) took place in November 1956 and considered the grave situation created by the Union of Soviet Socialist Republics in the suppression of the people of Hungary. The UNGA adopted five resolutions, including Resolution 1004 (ES-II) mandating a commission of inquiry into foreign intervention in Hungary.

The insistent requests of the UNGA "permit observers designated by the Secretary-General to enter the territory to carry out unfettered investigations" were met with Soviet stonewalling. Resolution 1130 (IX) was later passed but "the Soviet Union indicated that it would not be intimidated by the blackmail and threats" contained in it. "None of the suggested coercive action threatened by the General Assembly was taken... This early example neatly illustrated a general timidity of the Assembly both in framing cooperation in strong terms and in confronting non- cooperation, features that would remain present in many later situations even less politically charged as one involving a superpower."

== See also ==
- Hungarian Revolution of 1956
- List of UN General Assembly sessions
