= Fourth emergency special session of the United Nations General Assembly =

1960 session of the United Nations General Assembly

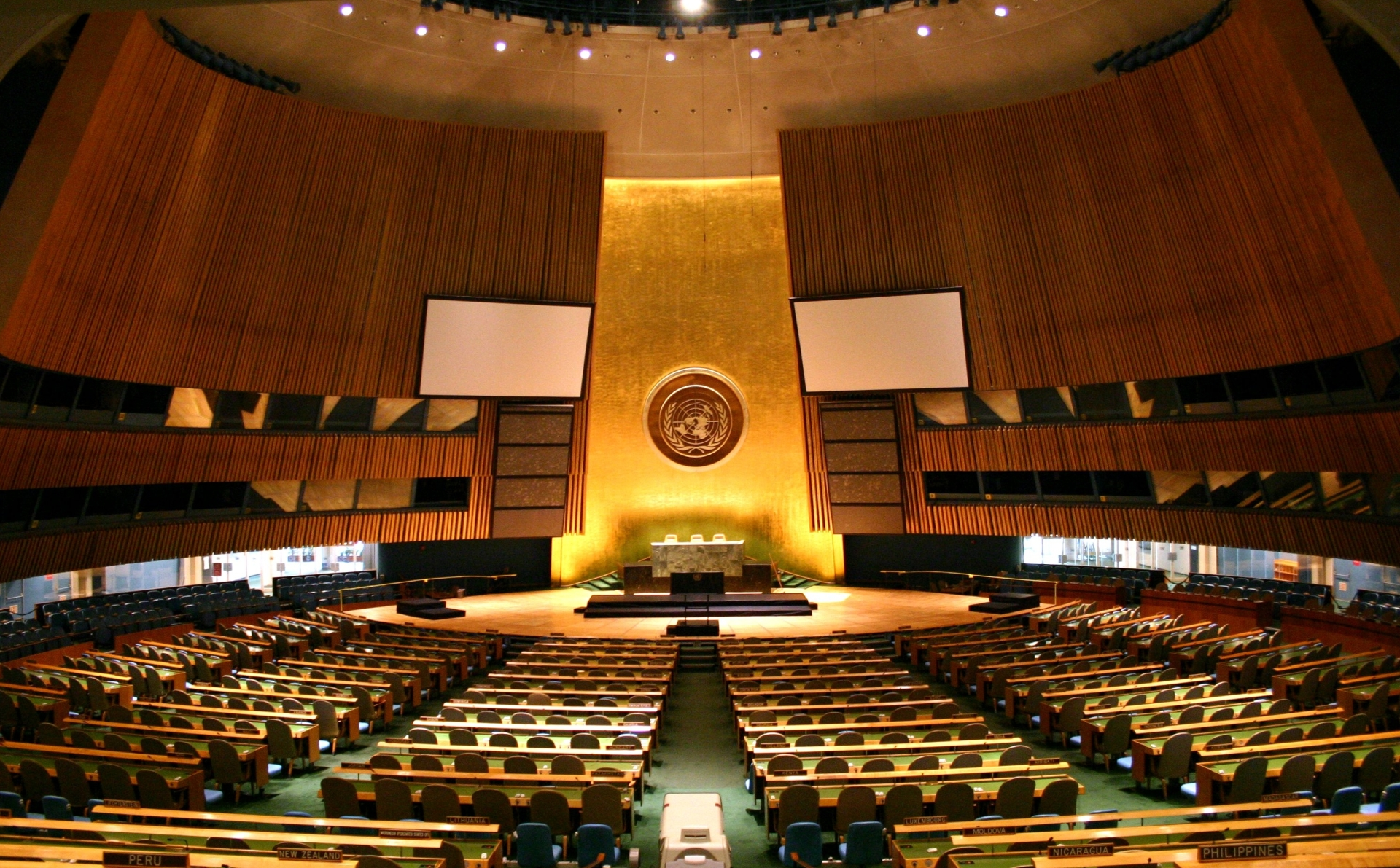
- General Assembly Hall
- Cities: New York City, New York, U.S.
- Venues: General Assembly Hall at the United Nations headquarters
- Participants: United Nations Member States
- Secretary: Dag Hammarskjöld

The Fourth emergency special session of the United Nations General Assembly was invoked by Resolution 157 due to a Security Council veto issued by the USSR. In September 1960 the Fourth Emergency Special Session on the "Congo Situation" adopted Resolution 1474 (ES-IV)/Rev. 1/ requesting Secretary-General Dag Hammarskjöld, who would in a few years' time perish in a mysterious plane crash in the nascent and very conflicted Republic of the Congo, to continue to take vigorous action in accordance with Security Council resolutions and appealing to all Members for urgent voluntary contributions to a UN Fund for the Congo and to refrain from sending military assistance except through the UN.

== See also ==
- List of UN General Assembly sessions
