= United Nations Security Council Resolution 129 =

UN Security Council Resolution 129
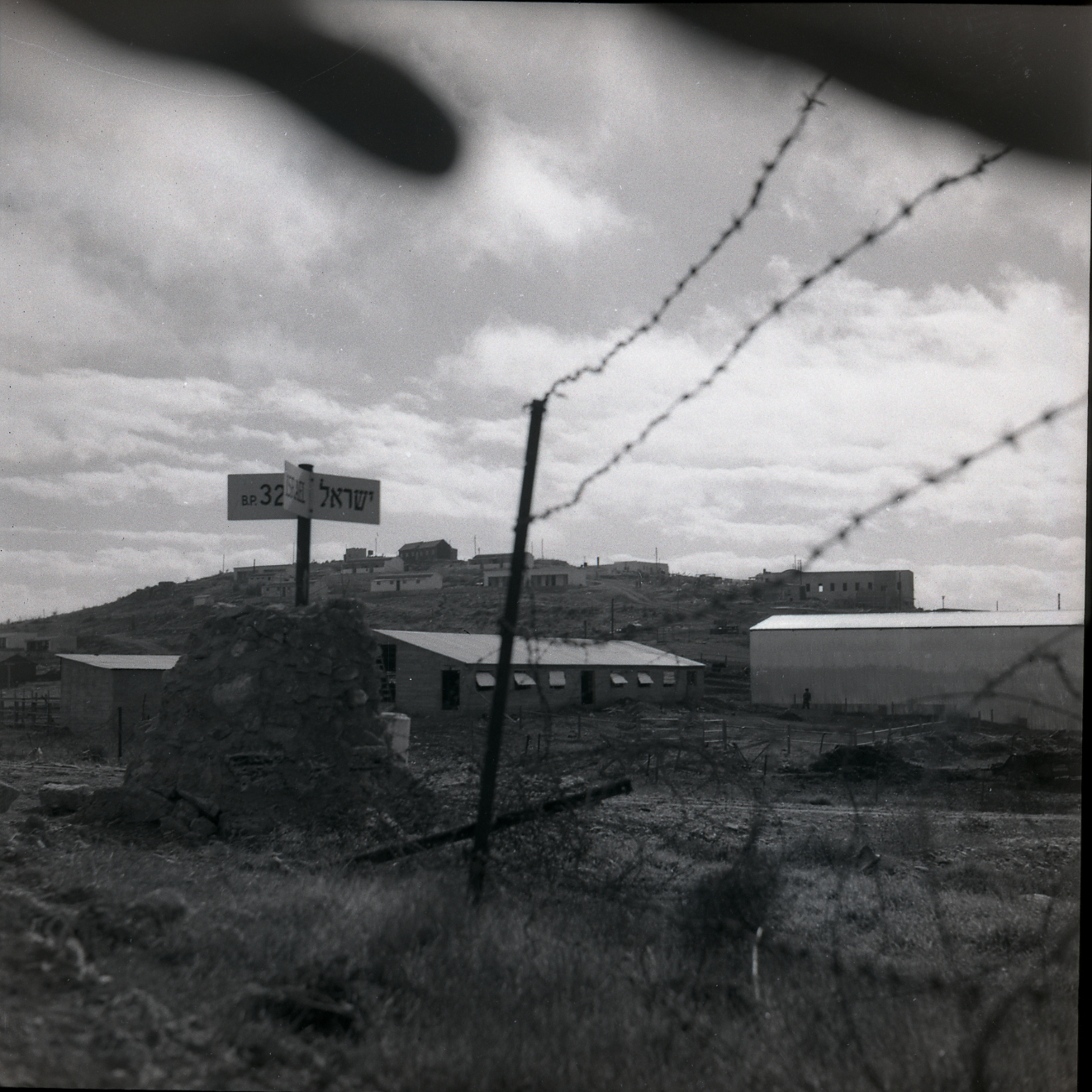
- Lebanese border
- Date: August 7 1958
- Meeting no.: 838
- Code: S/4083 (Document)
- Subject: Complaint by Lebanon - Complaint by Jordan
- Voting summary: 11 voted for; None voted against; None abstained
- Result: Adopted

Security Council composition
- Permanent members: China; France; Soviet Union; United Kingdom; United States
- Non-permanent members: Canada; Colombia; Iraq; Japan; Panama; Sweden

United Nations Security Council resolution 129, adopted unanimously on August 7, 1958, called an emergency special session of the General Assembly. The resolution states that this was as a result of the lack of unanimity of its permanent members at the council's 834th and 837th meetings which prevented it from exercising its primary responsibility for the maintenance of international peace and security.

== See also ==
- List of United Nations Security Council Resolutions 101 to 200 (1953–1965)
