= Eighth emergency special session of the United Nations General Assembly =

1981 session of the United Nations General Assembly

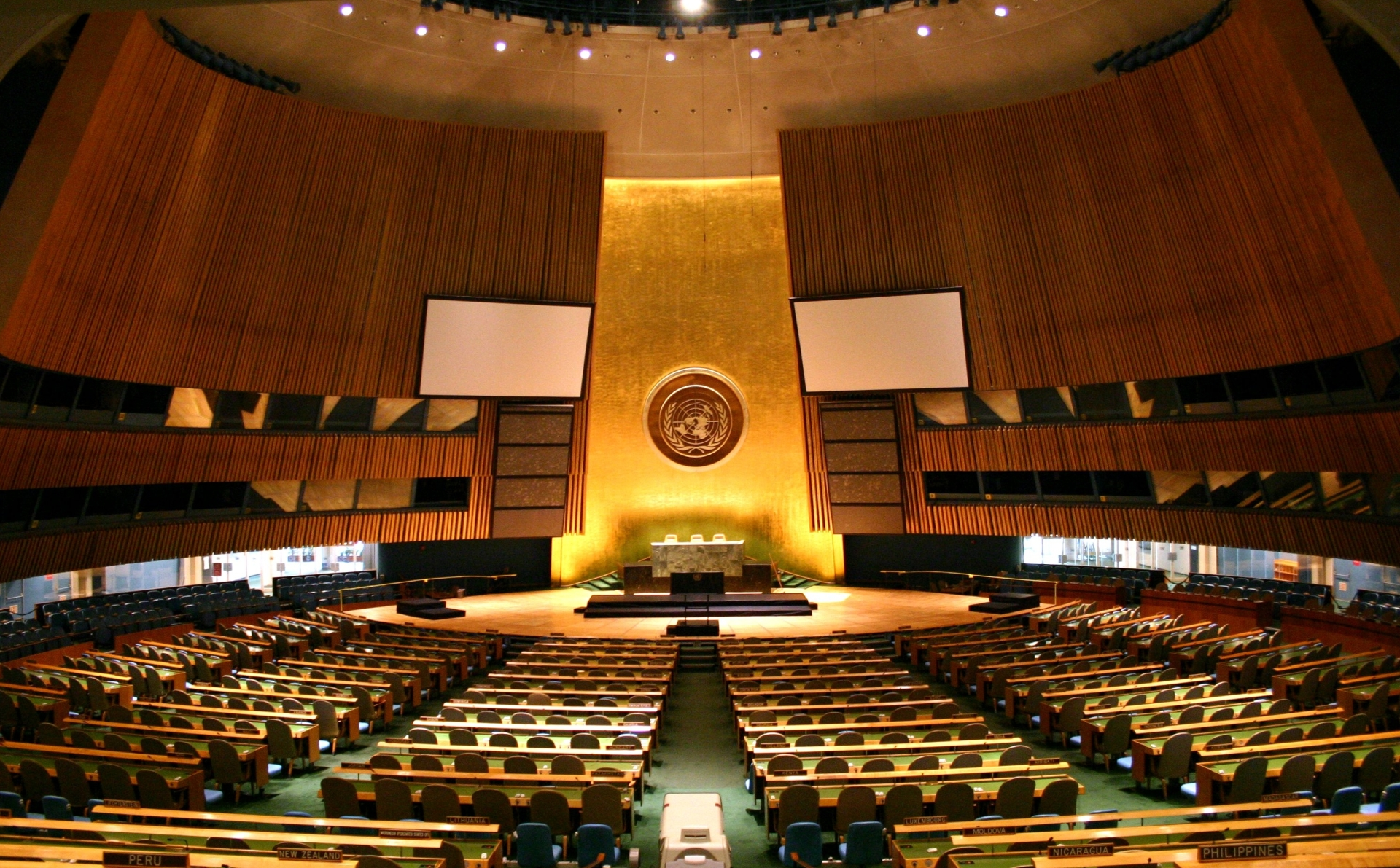
- General Assembly Hall
- Cities: New York City, New York, U.S.
- Venues: General Assembly Hall at the United Nations headquarters
- Participants: United Nations Member States
- Secretary: Kurt Waldheim

The Eighth emergency special session of the United Nations General Assembly (UNGA) was invoked by the UNGA at the request of Zimbabwe (A/ES-8/1). The Eighth Emergency Special Session was convened by Zimbabwe in order to discuss the "Question of Namibia". Its meetings were conducted between 3 September and 14 September 1981.

At the conclusion of the final meeting of the session, the Assembly adopted resolution A/RES/ES-8/2:

Declaring that the illegal occupation of Namibia by South Africa together with the repeated acts of aggression committed by South Africa against neighbouring States constitute a breach of international peace and security,

Noting with regret and concern that the Security Council failed to exercise its primary responsibility for the maintenance of international peace and security when draft resolutions proposing comprehensive mandatory sanctions against South Africa under Chapter VII of the Charter of the United Nations were vetoed by the three Western permanent members of the Council on 30 April 1981, ...

6. Calls upon Member States, specialized agencies and other international organizations to render increased and sustained support and material, financial, military and other assistance to the South West Africa People's Organization to enable it to intensify its struggle for the liberation of Namibia; ...

13. Calls upon all States, in view of the threat to international peace and security posed by South Africa, to impose against that country comprehensive mandatory sanctions in accordance with the provisions of the Charter;

14. Also strongly urges States to cease forthwith, individually and collectively, all dealings with South Africa in order totally to isolate it politically, economically, militarily and culturally; ...

This was the first occasion on which the Assembly authorized economic, diplomatic and cultural sanctions against a state; it had already authorized military sanctions by its resolution 1001 of 7 November 1956, during its first emergency special session.

== See also ==
- List of UN General Assembly sessions
