= Seventh emergency special session of the United Nations General Assembly =

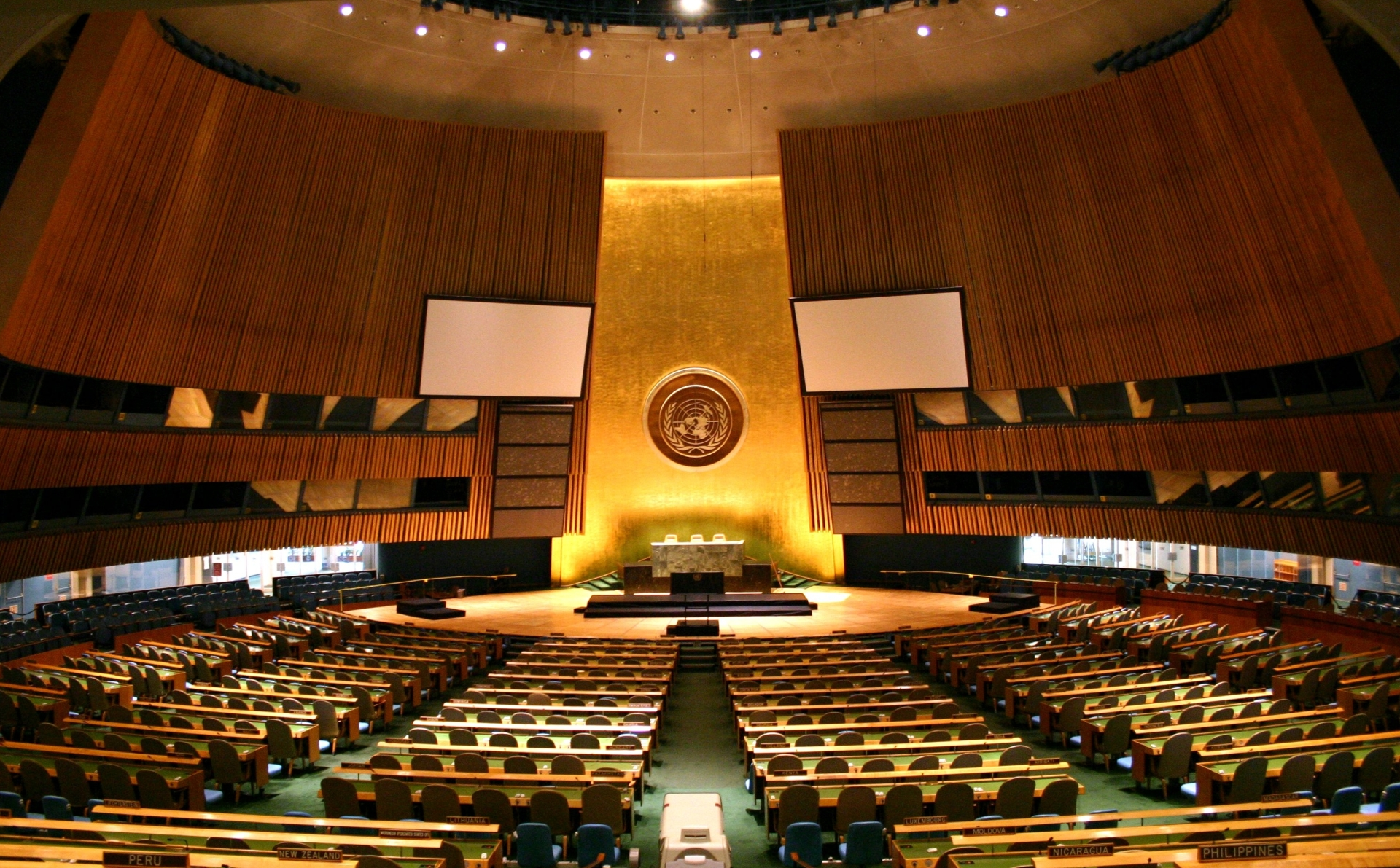
- General Assembly Hall
- Cities: New York City, New York, U.S.
- Venues: General Assembly Hall at the United Nations headquarters
- Participants: United Nations Member States
- Secretary: Kurt Waldheim

The seventh emergency special session of the United Nations General Assembly (UNGA) centred on the Palestine issue. It was held because of an American veto at the Security Council in 1980 at the instance of Senegal, and re-convened at various times.

== See also ==
- Emergency special session of the United Nations General Assembly
