= Gong Pusheng =

Chinese female diplomat

Gong Pusheng 龚普生
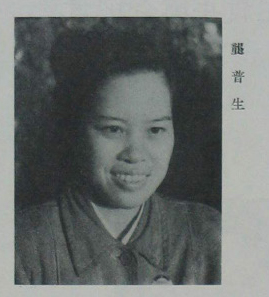
- Gong Pusheng
- Born: September 1913; Shanghai
- Died: 4 August 2007 (aged 93); Beijing
- Occupation: Diplomat
- Political party: Chinese Communist Party
- Spouse: Zhang Hanfu (1905–1972)
- Parents: Gong Zhenzhou (father); Xu Wen (mother)
- Relatives: Gong Peng (sister); Xu Wanqiu (sister)

Chinese name
- Simplified Chinese: 龚普生
- Traditional Chinese: 龔普生
Transcriptions
Standard Mandarin
- Hanyu Pinyin: Gōng Pǔshēng

Gong Pusheng (龚普生) or Wade–Giles: Kung Pu-sheng (September 1913 – 4 August 2007) was a Chinese revolutionary activist and diplomat.

== Biography ==
Gong Pusheng was born in September 1913 in Shanghai. Her father, Gong Zhenzhou, held several positions in the Sun Yat-sen's government. Her sister, Gong Peng, was also an activist and government official. In Shanghai she studied at St. Mary's Episcopalian Girls' School, and continued her higher education at Yenching University.

She joined the Chinese Communist Party in 1938. On the advice of Zhou Enlai, she later attended Columbia University, in New York, where she established contacts with prominent people, including Eleanor Roosevelt, Pearl Buck, and Paul Robeson.

In 1948 she became a member of the Human Rights Committee at the United Nations in New York. After the establishment of the People's Republic, she was deputy director in the Foreign Ministry, in charge of International Organization and Conference Department. She became director of the department in 1958. She became the first ambassador from the Peoples Republic to Ireland in August 1980.She joined Chinese delegations to international conferences and undertook extensive visits abroad.

In 1949 she married Zhang Hanfu (1905 – 1972), also a senior diplomat. Her sister Gong Peng also served in the Foreign Ministry.

She died in Beijing on 4 August 2007.

== In popular culture ==
Gong Pusheng is played by Lang Yueting in the film The Volunteers: To the War, in which she is depicted as a member the first delegation from the People's Republic of China to attend a United Nations Security Council meeting in November 1950. Also in this delegation, headed by Wu Xiuquan, was her brother-in-law, Qiao Guanhua.
