= Adam Malik =

Vice President of Indonesia from 1978 to 1983

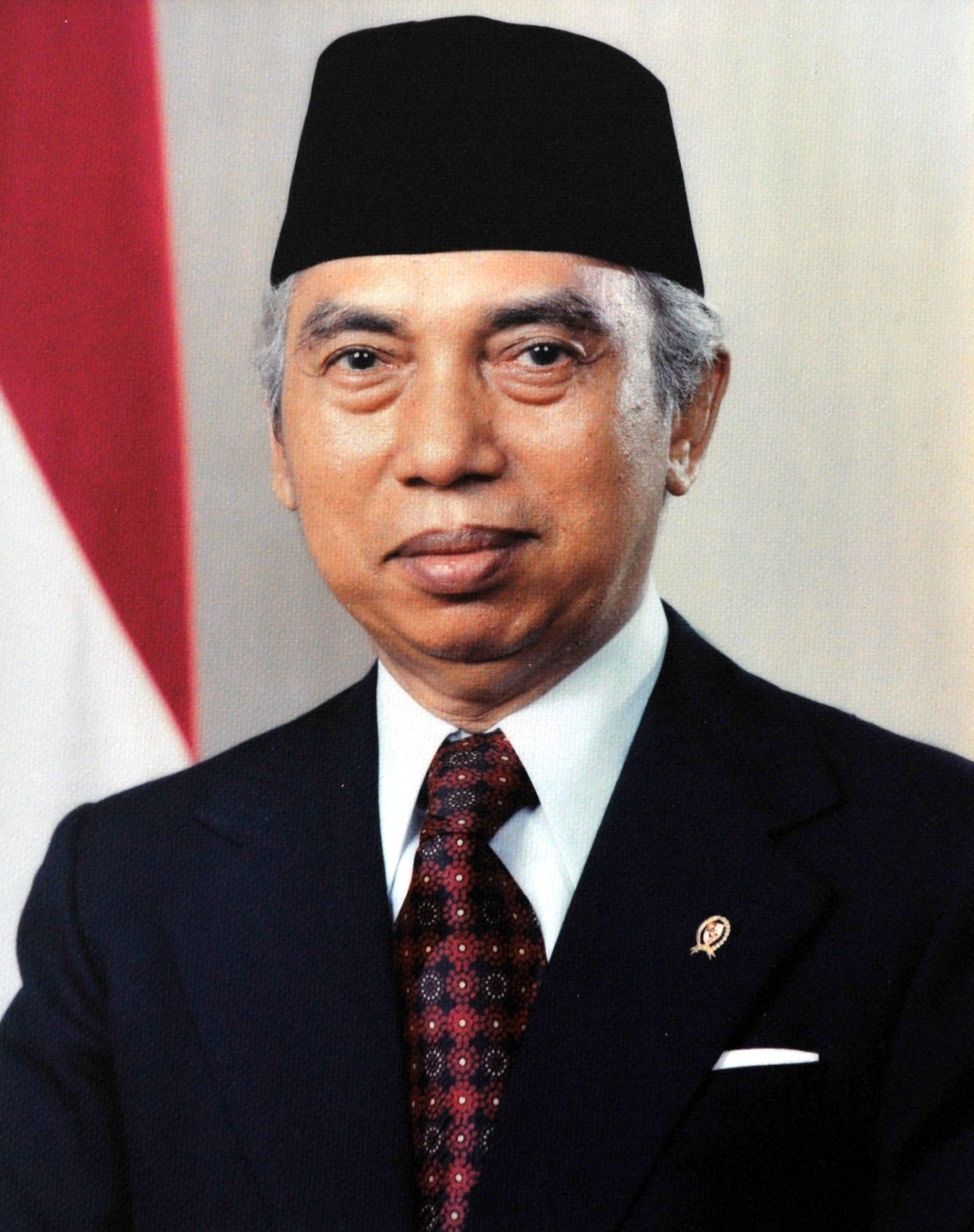
- Official portrait, 1978

3rd Vice President of Indonesia
- In office 23 March 1978 – 11 March 1983
- President: Suharto
- Preceded by: Hamengkubuwono IX
- Succeeded by: Umar Wirahadikusumah

4th Speaker of the People's Consultative Assembly
- In office 1 October 1977 – 23 March 1978
- Preceded by: Idham Chalid
- Succeeded by: Daryatmo

7th Speaker of the House of Representatives
- In office 1 October 1977 – 23 March 1978
- Preceded by: Idham Chalid
- Succeeded by: Daryatmo

11th Minister of Foreign Affairs
- In office 28 March 1966 – 1 October 1977
- President: Sukarno; Suharto
- Preceded by: Subandrio
- Succeeded by: Mochtar Kusumaatmadja

26th President of the United Nations General Assembly
- In office 1971–1972
- Preceded by: Edvard Hambro
- Succeeded by: Stanisław Trepczyński

18th Minister of Trade
- In office 13 November 1963 – 27 August 1964
- Preceded by: Soeharto Sastrosoeyoso
- Succeeded by: Achmad Yusuf

Personal details
- Born: Adam Malik Batubara; 22 July 1917 Pematangsiantar, Sumatra Oostkust, Dutch East Indies
- Died: 5 September 1984 (aged 67) Bandung, Indonesia
- Resting place: Kalibata Heroes' Cemetery
- Party: Golkar
- Other political affiliations: Partindo; Murba
- Spouse: Nelly Ilyas (m. 1942)
- Children: 5
- Parents: Abdul Malik Batubara (father); Salamah Lubis (mother)
- Occupation: Politician; legislator; diplomat; journalist

Military service
- Allegiance: Indonesia
- Branch/service: Indonesian guerillas
- Years of service: 1940s
- Rank: Commandant
- Battles/wars: World War II; Indonesian National Revolution

Adam Malik Batubara (22 July 1917 – 5 September 1984) was an Indonesian politician, diplomat, and journalist, who served as the third vice president of Indonesia from 1978 until 1983, under President Suharto. Previously, he served in a number of diplomatic and governmental positions, including Speaker of the People's Consultative Assembly from 1977 to 1978, Speaker of the People's Representative Council from 1977 to 1978, Foreign Minister of Indonesia from 1966 until 1977, and president of the United Nations General Assembly from 1971 until 1972.

Born in Pematangsiantar, North Sumatra, on 22 July 1917, he grew up relatively comfortably, and was educated at the Hollandsch-Inlandsche School (HIS). He pioneered the establishment of the Antara news agency in 1937, and was an active supporter of Indonesian independence, being put in prison for disobeying the Colonial Government's ban on political assemblies. Towards independence on 17 August 1945, he was involved in the Rengasdengklok incident and the Proclamation of Independence. Following independence, he served in a number of government positions, including as a member of the People's Representative Council (DPR) and as the Minister for Trade. He continued to serve in government, following the fall of Sukarno. Being appointed Foreign Minister in 1966. In 1977, he was elected as Speaker of both the People's Representative Council (DPR) People's Consultative Assembly (MPR). In 1978, he was elected as the 3rd vice president of the Republic of Indonesia replacing Sri Sultan Hamengkubuwono IX who unexpectedly stated that he was not willing to be nominated again.

As vice president, he criticized the government for its increasing feudalism-like structure and rampant corruption, referring it as an "epidemic." In 1983, Malik's term as vice president came to an end and he was replaced by Umar Wirahadikusumah. Adam Malik died on 5 September 1984, in Bandung, due to liver cancer. His body was interred in the Kalibata Heroes' Cemetery. Later, his wife and children established the Adam Malik Museum. He was designated as a National Hero on 6 November 1998 based on Presidential Decree No. 107/TK/1998.

== Early life ==
Adam Malik Batubara was born on 22 July 1917, in Pematangsiantar, North Sumatra. He was born into a Muslim Mandailing Batak family of the Batubara clan. His father was Abdul Malik Batubara and his mother was Salamah Lubis. He was the third child of 9 children. His family was relatively wealthy, with his parents both being traders. The family were the only ones who owned a Buick sedan in his hometown. Growing up, Adam Malik was fond of reading, photography, and watching cowboy films. Adam Malik received his basic education at the Hollandsch-Inlandsche School (HIS), in Pematangsiantar. Adam Malik was also active in the national movement, a self-taught figure. He continued his education at the Sumatra Thawalib Islamic Boarding School Parabek in Bukittinggi, however he returned home to help his parents just a year and a half later.

== Early career ==
Adam Malik started his involvement in politics in 1930 in Pematangsiantar. From the beginning he consciously chose the political field, through his dedication in the struggle to achieve Indonesian independence, and then he also took part in a functional role after independence. He would become the Chairman of the Pematang Siantar branch of Partindo (Indonesia Party) when he was 17. In this position, Malik campaigned for the Dutch Colonial Government to grant independence to Indonesia. As a result of this, Malik was put in prison for disobeying the Colonial Government's ban on political assemblies. Once he was freed, Malik left Pematang Siantar for Jakarta. When he turned 20, Adam Malik, sought a career in journalism. Together with Soemanang, Sipahutar, Armin Pane, Abdul Hakim, and Pandu Kartawiguna, pioneered the establishment of the Antara news agency in 1937 based in JI. Pinangsia 38 Jakarta Kota. At the time, Adam Malik was then appointed to be the editor as well as the deputy director of Antara. Apart from working for Antara, Adam Malik also wrote a number of articles for several newspapers, including the Pelita Andalas newspaper and Partindo magazine.

During the Japanese occupation of Indonesia, Adam Malik was a member of the Youth Movement Leadership Council in preparation for Indonesian independence in Jakarta, and he actively fought against the Japanese military. Adam Malik also played an important role in the events leading up to Indonesia's declaration of independence. On 16 August 1945, Adam Malik and other pro-independence youths kidnapped nationalist movement leaders Sukarno and Mohammad Hatta. They took the two leaders to the town of Rengasdengklok and forced them to declare Indonesia's independence to fill the vacuum left by the Japanese Occupational Forces which had surrendered. Sukarno and Hatta finally declared Indonesia's independence on 17 August 1945. The two were also elected as Indonesia's first president and vice president.

Following the recognition of Indonesian sovereignty, Adam Malik became more and more active in several organizational activities. He became one of the founding figures and members of the People's Party, founder of the Murba Party, and in 1956, he succeeded in serving as a member of the People's Representative Council which was born from the results of the 1955 general election. He would go on to serve as Minister for Trade from 1963 until 1964 before being appointed Minister for the Implementation of the Guided Economy in Sukarno's Cabinet. Adam Malik then took up the duties of a diplomat. In 1959, he was appointed ambassador to the Soviet Union and Poland. Adam Malik was then appointed as Chairman of the Delegation of the Republic of Indonesia for negotiations between Indonesia and the Netherlands regarding the West Irian region in Washington, D.C., United States.

== New Order ==
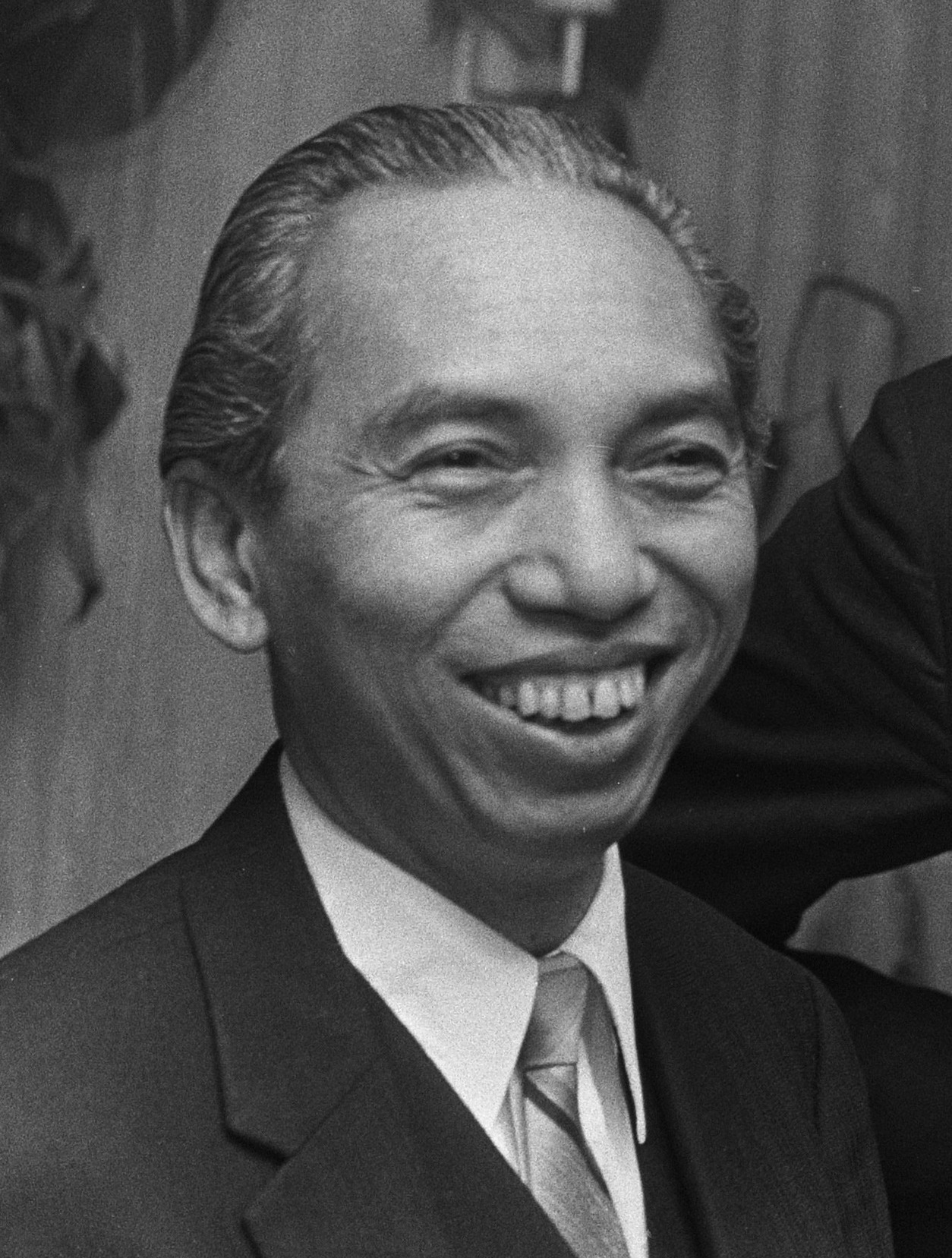
Adam Malik, 1967

With Sukarno being increasingly influenced by the Indonesian Communist Party (PKI) in his policies, Adam Malik set up the Preservation Institution of Sukarnoism (BPS). This organisation aimed to translate Sukarnoist ideas in a non-Communist sense and to use the name Sukarno to criticise the PKI. Sukarno was not oblivious to this and banned BPS in 1965. Together with General Abdul Haris Nasution and Ruslan Abdulgani, Adam Malik was despised by the PKI for his anti-Communist stance. Relations between Sukarno and Malik became frosty. Through an introduction from Shigetada Nishijima, Malik met with CIA station chief Clyde McAvoy at a safe house in Jakarta and began providing information to the CIA about Sukarno's inner circle and relations with the PKI. In 1965, as per archives from CIA, Adam Malik reportedly received Rp. 50 million to execute the ex-PKI.

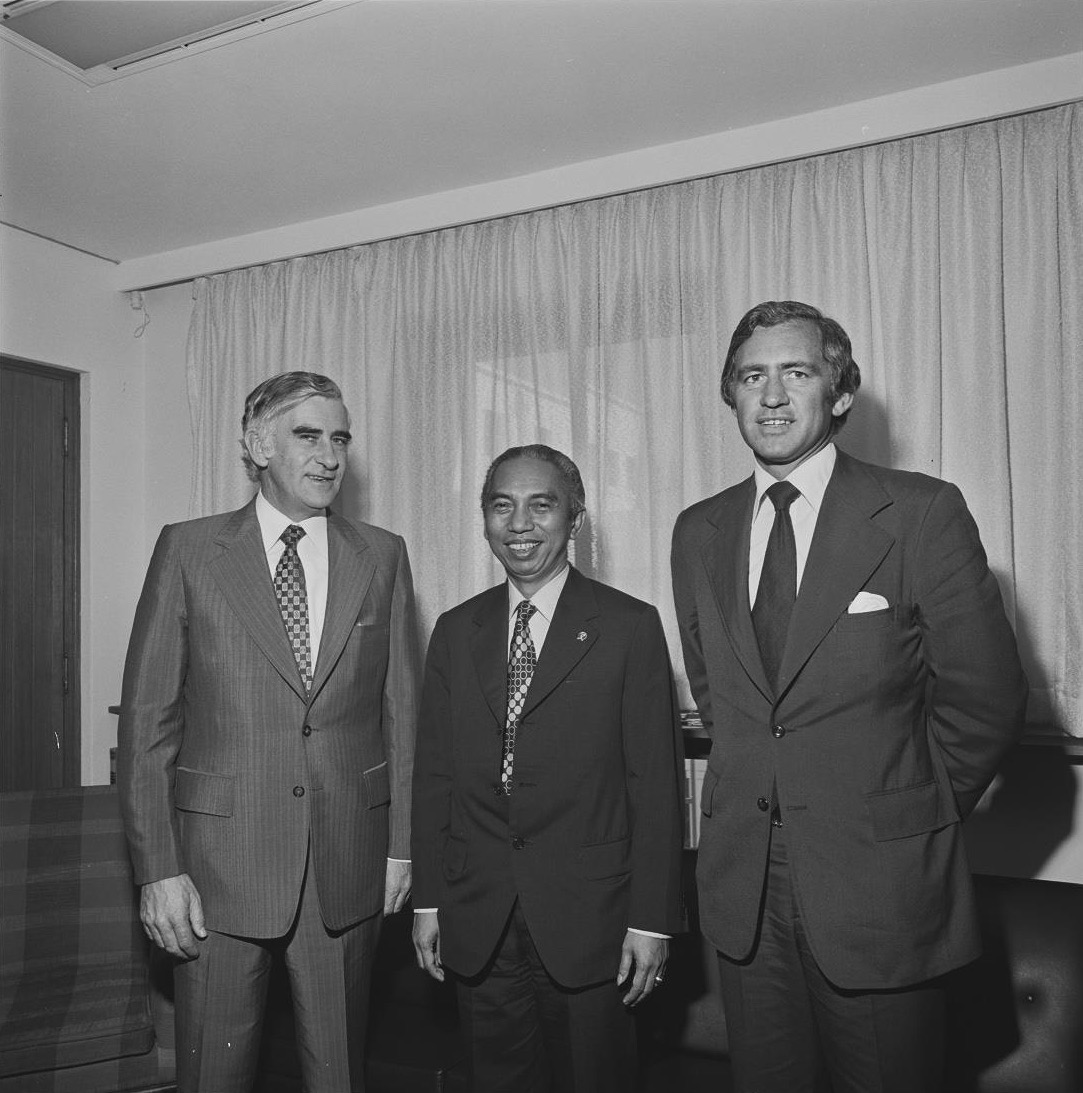
Malik with Australian political figures Billy Snedden and Andrew Peacock on 13 November 1973

As written by William Colby of the CIA's Far East division to the State Department's William Bundy : "Ambassador Green's December 2, 1965 endorsement of a 50 million rupiah covert payment to the "army-inspired but civilian-staffed action group [Kap-Gestapu]... still carrying burden of current repressive efforts targeted against PKI...." (pp. 379–380)". American officials from the embassy in Jakarta passed lists of thousands of names of the PKI leadership to an aide of Malik's. These lists were then passed on to Malik, who in turn passed them on to Suharto's headquarters. From the end of 1965 to 1966, 500,000 to over a million Indonesians accused of being communists or belonging to other maligned minorities were murdered by the Indonesian military and Suharto-aligned paramilitaries. In 1966, Sukarno lost his executive powers as he passed them over to Lieutenant General Suharto through a Presidential decree known as Supersemar. Although Sukarno continued to keep the title of President, all the de facto power was in the hand of Suharto. A Cabinet reshuffle followed in which Malik took up the position of Minister of Foreign Affairs. Malik, together with Suharto and Hamengkubuwono IX formed a triumvirate as they sought to reverse Sukarno's policies.

As Foreign Affairs Minister, Malik conducted trips to Western countries to reschedule debt payments. Malik also quit the Murba Party that year to put himself more in line with the new regime's more open economic policies. The Murba Party having been a party that rejected foreign investments. In 1967, Malik, together with the Foreign Ministers of Philippines, Thailand, Singapore, and Deputy Prime Minister of Malaysia would officially form ASEAN in a bid to form a united front in the face of Communist expansion in Vietnam. Around this time, Adam Malik would also represent Indonesia and deputise for Suharto in summits, as early in his presidency, Suharto was not interested in foreign policy.

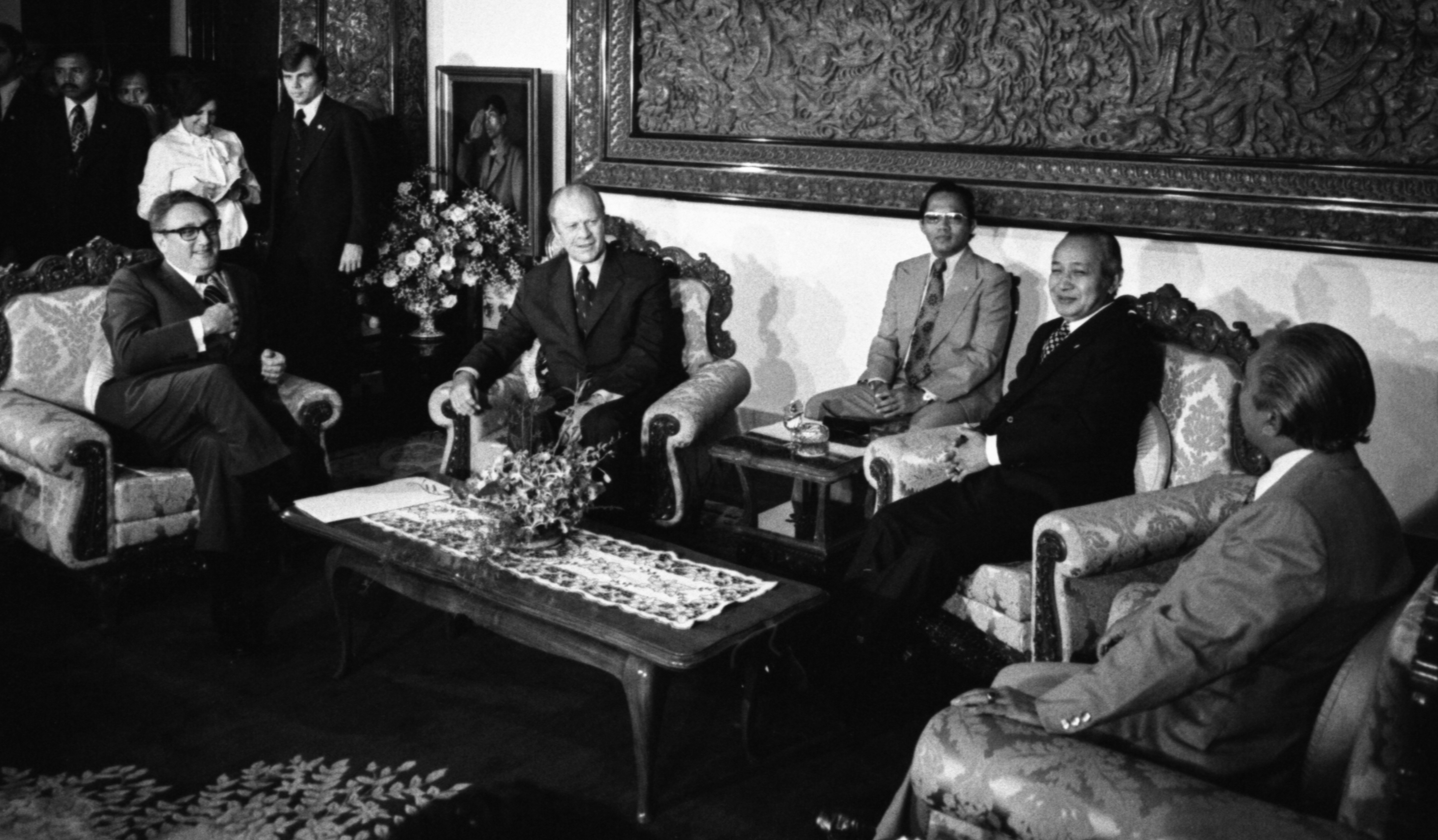
Malik, Suharto, U.S. President Gerald Ford and Henry Kissinger in Jakarta on 6 December 1975, one day before the Indonesian invasion of East Timor

Adam Malik had a number of differences with Suharto's Indonesian National Armed Forces Generals such as General Maraden Panggabean over the way in which Indonesia should approach its Foreign Policy in Southeast Asia. The Generals wanted Indonesia and its regional neighbours in ASEAN to have a closer security co-operation which in effect. The Generals were also in favour of sending Indonesian troops to help the South Vietnamese in the Vietnam War. On the other hand, Malik insisted that ASEAN should only be about economic, not military co-operation. In this he was supported by Suharto.

Malik also adopted a softer stance towards the People's Republic of China, which the Suharto regime saw as supporters of the Indonesian Communist Party (PKI). In 1971, Malik was elected President of the United Nations General Assembly and passed UNGA Resolution 2578. Malik was briefly involved in the crisis that would lead to the invasion of East Timor. Malik had assured an East Timorese delegation led by José Ramos-Horta that Indonesia would not be involved in the crisis in East Timor. Suharto at first supported this stance towards East Timor but in 1975, was convinced by his Generals to intervene and invade. In 1977, Malik was replaced as Foreign Minister as he took on the Chairmanship of the People's Consultative Assembly (MPR).

== Vice presidency ==
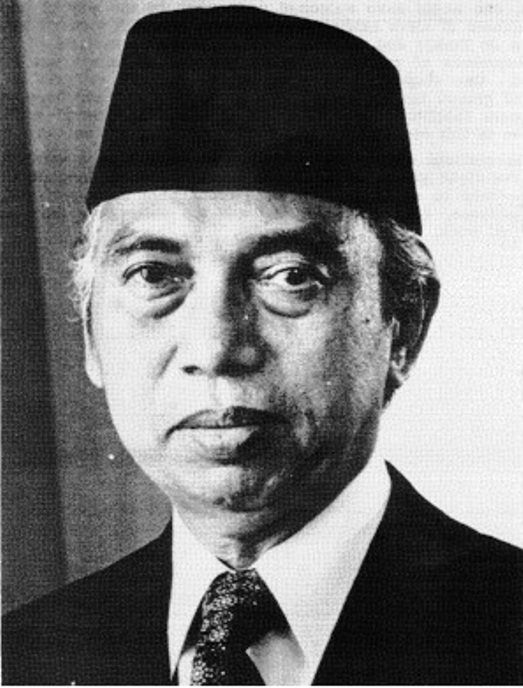
Adam Malik in 1970

It was expected that the Suharto and Vice President Hamengkubuwono IX duet would be retained for another term. However, Hamengkubuwono IX had become disillusioned with Suharto's increasing authoritarianism and the increasing corruption. These two elements were also recognized by protesters who had demanded that Suharto not stand for another term as president. These protests reached its peak in February 1978, when students of Bandung Technological Institute (ITB) published a book giving reasons as to why Suharto should not be elected president. In response, Suharto sent troops to take over the campus and issued a ban on the book. Hamengkubuwono could not accept Suharto's actions. In March 1978, Hamengkubuwono rejected his nomination as vice president by the MPR. Suharto asked Hamengkubuwono to change his mind, but Hamengkubuwono continued to reject the offer and cited health as his reason for not accepting the nomination. After considering some alternative candidates, Suharto chose Adam Malik to be his vice president.

As vice president, he felt that he could not play much of a role. During his time as vice president, he liked to collect various items, ranging from ceramics, statues, and precious stones. More than 5,000 objects from his collection have been exhibited in a museum managed by his wife. However, his life as vice president was mainly uneventful, only playing an occasional role in inaugurating projects and opening seminars. Despite being vice president, Adam Malik was not afraid to criticize the Government. In 1979, he admitted that the current regime had violated the spirit of the 1945 constitution. He also criticised the increasing feudalism in the regime. A reference to Suharto, who acted in the manner of a feudal Javanese King. In 1981, Malik commented on the corruption in the regime, referring it as an "epidemic".

=== Death and legacy ===
Following the end of his term as vice president, Adam Malik moved to Bandung, West Java. He died on 5 September 1984, due to liver cancer. His body was interred in the Kalibata Heroes' Cemetery. Later, his wife and children immortalized his name by establishing the Adam Malik Museum. He was designated as a National Hero on 6 November 1998 based on Presidential Decree No. 107/TK/1998.

== Honors and awards ==
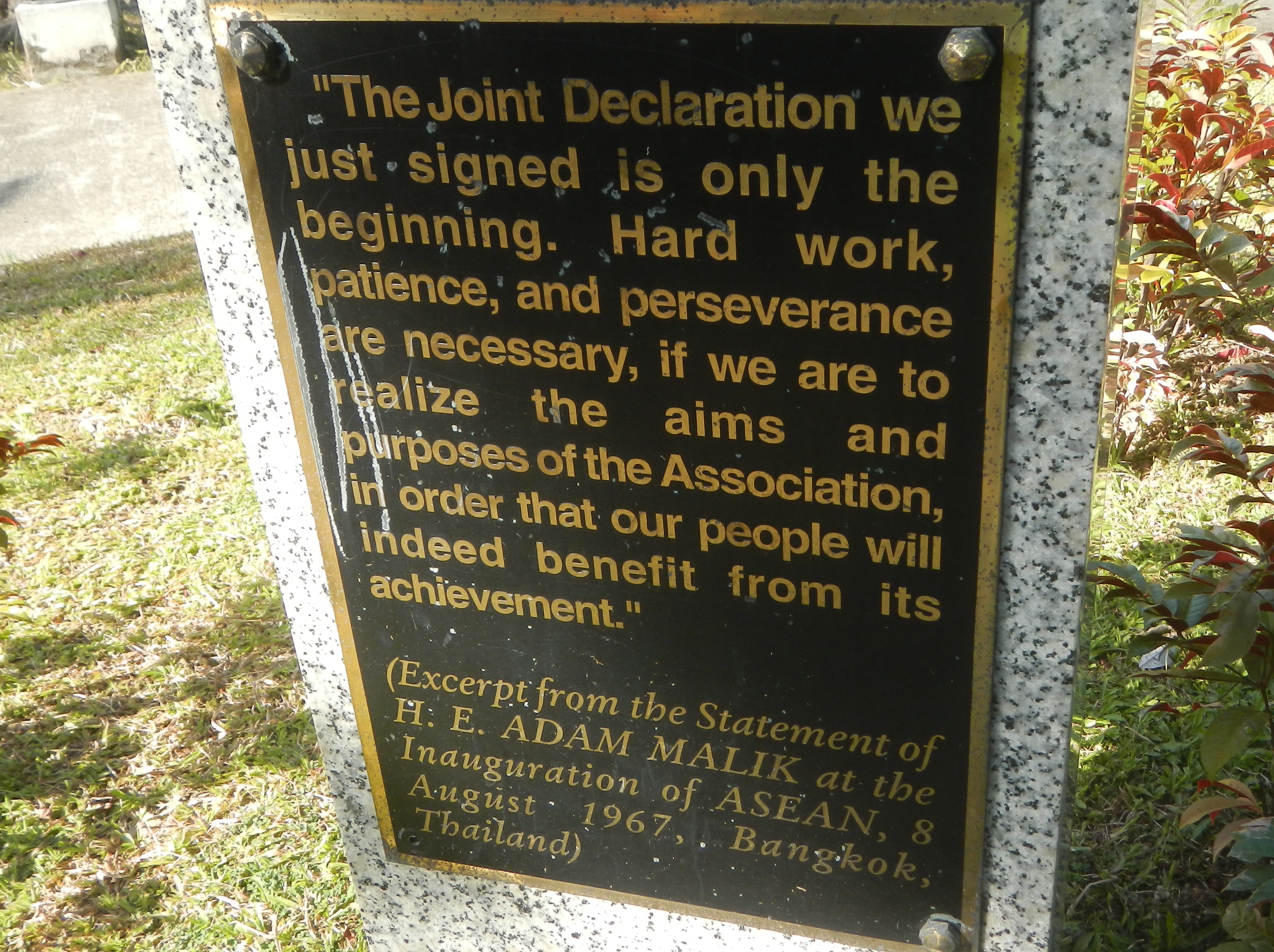
Bust of Adam Malik at the ASEAN Garden with the excerpt from his statement at the inauguration of ASEAN.

=== National honors ===
- Star of the Republic of Indonesia, 2nd Class (Indonesian: Bintang Republik Indonesia Adipradana) (10 March 1973)
- Star of Mahaputera, 1st Class (Indonesian: Bintang Mahaputera Adipurna) (23 March 1978)
- Star of Mahaputera, 4th Class (Indonesian: Bintang Mahaputera Pratama) (17 August 1961)

=== Foreign honors ===
- Cambodia :
  - Grand Cross of the Royal Order of Sahametrei (1968)
- France :
  - Grand Cross of the National Order of Merit (1972)
- Italy :
  - Knight Grand Cross of the Order of Merit of the Italian Republic (OMRI) (1972)
- Malaysia :
  - Honorary Grand Commander of the Order of the Defender of the Realm (S.M.N.) (1970)
- Philippines:
  - Grand Collar of the Order of Lakandula (2017)
- South Korea :
  - Grand Gwanghwa Medal of the Order of Diplomatic Service Merit (1981)
- Yugoslavia
  - Order of the Yugoslav Flag with Sash (1975)

== Personal life ==
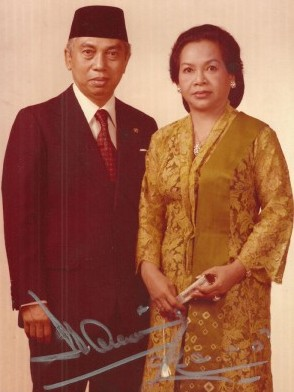
Adam Malik (left), with his wife Nelly Malik (right)

Adam Malik was married to Nelly Malik, the second daughter of a Minangkabau nomadic couple. They were married in 1942, while he was working as an employee at the newly established news agency. His wife actively participated in politics, following her husband's footsteps in the struggle to achieve independence from the Dutch. Together, they had five children: Otto Malik, Antarini Malik, Ilham Malik, Imron Malik and Budisita Malik.

== See also ==
- Bangkok Conference
- Antara news agency
- Murba Party

Political offices
Preceded by Hamengkubuwono IX	Vice President of Indonesia; 23 March 1978 – 11 March 1983	Succeeded by Umar Wirahadikusumah
Preceded by Idham Chalid	Speaker of the People's Consultative Assembly; Speaker of the House of Representatives; 1977–1978	Succeeded by Daryatmo
Preceded by Subandrio	Minister of Foreign Affairs; 1966–1977	Succeeded by Mochtar Kusumaatmadja
Diplomatic posts
Preceded by Edvard Hambro	President of the United Nations General Assembly; 1970–1971	Succeeded by Stanisław Trepczyński
