= Hūwašan =

Hūwašan (Manchu: ᡥᡡᠸᠠᡧᠠᠨ, romanized: Hūwašan; d. 1676) was a Qing dynasty official of the Irgen Gioro clan of Fe Ala assigned to the Manchu Bordered Yellow Banner. His ancestor, Selengge Hashū, joined to Nurhaci's tribe during the rise of the Jianzhou Jurchen leader.

== Biography ==
Hūwašan began his career as a bithe-si (imperial secretarial clerk) and was promoted from Assistant Minister of Personnel to a Director in the Ministry of Justice. In 1656, despite being a civil official, he accompanied General Irde on the Qing expedition against Zhoushan. During the battle, Hūwašan was the first to board an enemy vessel under a hail of arrows and stones. He suffered multiple wounds, including a severe sword injury that exposed his intestines. Holding his wound with one hand and wielding a sword with the other, he continued fighting, killing two enemies and wounding several more. Motivated by his leading example, his subordinates boarded the enemy ship, capturing more than one hundred enemy soldiers and one vessel. The main effort then launched a successful pursuit and won a decisive victory. For his military achievements, Hūwašan was awarded the hereditary rank of tuwašara hafan and promoted to Minister of the Court of the Imperial Stud. He was later promoted to Secretariat Academician and Deputy Minister of Rites, and in the early years of the Kangxi reign served as Academician of the Hongwen Academy.

In 1670, Hūwašan was appointed Governor of Gansu. He requested tax exemptions for refugees displaced by famine. At the time, a major epidemic had broken out in Xihe and Lixian. Hūwašan opened government granaries to provide relief and, with the spring plowing season approaching, purchased farming oxen for agricultural use. The relevant ministry accused him of violating regulations, but the Kangxi Emperor pardoned him. After the outbreak of the Revolt of the Three Feudatories, Wang Fuchen, one of the Qing commanders in Shaanxi, rebelled against the Qing and seized Lanzhou. Hūwašan, together with Zhang Yong (張勇), Wang Jinbao (王進宝), Chen Fu (陳福), and Sun Sike (孫思克), advanced from several directions and recaptured the city. He subsequently joined Zhang Yong in recovering Hezhou, Taozhou, and Gongchang. These achievements earned him imperial commendation from the Kangxi Emperor. Hūwašan died in 1676 while serving as Governor of Gansu.

His grandson Dexin (德新) passed the imperial examination as a Jinshi in 1715 and later achieved to the position of Deputy Minister of Works in Mukden.
