= Zhang Shizhao =

Chinese intellectual (1881 – 1973)

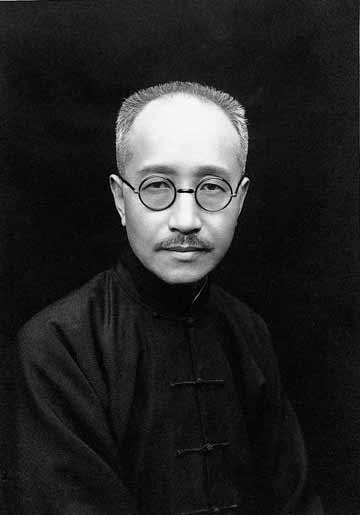
- Born: 20 March 1881; Changsha County, Hunan, Qing China
- Died: 1 July 1973 (aged 92); British Hong Kong
- Spouse: Wu Ruonan (m. 1909–1973)
- Relatives: Jack Yung Chang (son); Zhang Hanzhi (adopted daughter)

Zhang Shizhao (simplified Chinese: 章士钊; traditional Chinese: 章士釗; pinyin: Zhāng Shìzhāo; Wade–Giles: Chang Shih-chao; 20 March 1881 – 1 July 1973), courtesy name Xingyan, pen name Huangzhonghuang, Qingtong or Qiutong, was a Chinese journalist, educator, politician of the early 20th century known for his advocacy first of revolutionary cultural values in the period leading up to the 1911 Revolution and then of traditional Confucian culture in following years.

From the early years of the 20th century, Zhang edited a series of widely read journals and in the 1910s and 20s conducted respectful debates with New Culture Movement advocates of deep change and promoted Classical Chinese writing and protested written vernacular Chinese. He was the Minister of Justice and Minister of Education of the Beiyang Government, led by Duan Qirui during the Republic of China period. He was a senator in the Republic of China government and a standing committee member of the National People's Congress of the People's Republic of China and a standing committee member of the CPPCC in PRC. He was the president of the Central Research Institute of Culture and History. In 1949, Zhang was among a group of non-Communist intellectuals who reached out to Mao Zedong.

Essentials of Logic (Luoji zhiyao 邏輯指要) - one of his major works

== Biography ==
Zhang Shizhao was born in Changsha in Hunan. He entered Lianghu Academy of Chinese Literature (两湖书院) in 1901 and was a classmate of Huang Xing, with whom he co-founded the Huaxing Party (华兴会) (out of which in 1904 the Huaxinghui was created). In May 1903, he was appointed the chief editor of the Su Bao journal. After the paper was banned, he founded "Minyu Daily", whose name (literally meaning "people's murmurs") insinuated that people could not complain loudly, only murmur (民不敢声，惟有吁也). Together with Yang Shouren, Cai Yuanpei, Cai E and others, he organized the Patriot Association in Shanghai.

In these early years, Zhang took a radical position, rejecting Confucian culture in favor of Western values. His botched attempt to assassinate the Empress Dowager led him to flee. He went first to Japan, where he was much impressed with the advanced state of modernization, and then to Great Britain, where he enrolled at University of Aberdeen, then later University of Edinburgh. This trip did not convince him of the virtues of the West, but brought about a reconciliation with traditional Chinese values.

After the Xinhai Revolution, he joined the opposition to the Beiyang Military Government led by Yuan Shikai. In 1914 he founded and became the editor in chief of Jiayin (The Tiger), a conservative journal. In 1916 he fled once more to Japan, returning briefly to Beijing only to leave once again for Shanghai, then to Guangzhou, then again to Europe in 1921.

At some point, he lent the young Mao Zedong some 20,000 yuan, perhaps because he had met Mao's father-in-law, Yang Changji while they were students in England.

As the New Culture Movement of the 1910s gathered support among young intellectuals, Zhang stood against their allegiance to Western ideas and institutions. He promoted Classical Chinese writing and protested written vernacular Chinese, disputing for many years with Hu Shih, a pioneer of liberal Chinese. He insisted that China as an agrarian country could not absorb institutions developed in the industrial West. He advocated a political system organized around professions or "caucases" rather than European-style electoral democracy.

In 1925, Zhang became Minister of Justice and Minister of Education in the government led by Duan Qirui. When student demonstrators ransacked Zhang's house in order to protest his support of Confucian ritual in the schools and suppression of student activism, in retaliation he fired their prominent hero, Lu Xun. In 1930, he was invited by Zhang Xueliang and became the dean of the school of Chinese literature at Northeast University in China. After the Mukden Incident, he went to Shanghai to work as a lawyer.

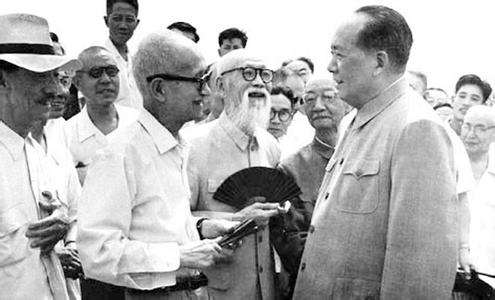
Mao Zedong and Zhang in 1963

After the Sino-Japanese War, he became a senator in the Republic of China Chongqing government. He returned to Shanghai later, resumed his law practice, and defended Liang Hongzhi and Zhou Fohai when they were prosecuted as hanjian for their wartime collaboration with the Japanese.

In Spring of 1949, he was invited by Li Zongren as a KMT delegate and twice went to Beijing to negotiate with Chairman Mao, a fellow native of Changsha whom he had known many years before. Zhang stayed in China as the new government took control and spoke on its behalf to overseas Chinese.

In May 1973, he flew to British Hong Kong. Official PRC sources suggested that he was in Hong Kong to coordinate a proposed "Third CPC-KMT cooperation" (reconciliation with the Chiang Kai-shek government in Taiwan).

He died in Hong Kong on July 1, 1973, aged 92.

He had three sons: Zhang Ke (章可), Zhang Yong (章用), and Zhang Yin (章因). Zhang Yong and Zhang Yin died young and were unmarried. Zhang Ke married in his 60s and did not have children.

His adopted daughter was Zhang Hanzhi, who, at the suggestion of Mao Zedong, married the then recently widowed Qiao Guanhua.

== Publications ==
- Luoji zhiyao 邏輯指要 (Essentials of Logic)
