= The Tiger (political magazine) =

Chinese publication

The Tiger (Chinese: 甲寅; pinyin: Jiayin) was a political magazine which was initiated by Chinese intellectuals Zhang Shizhao and Chen Duxiu and was in circulation between 1914 and 1915.

The magazine began as the effort of Zhang Shizhao to create his own publication in the wake of his departure from The People's Stand, then the official publication of the Guomindang. Originally called Independence Weekly, Zhang set out to establish his new journal as politically moderate and without his former connection to the Guomindang. Shortly after, he recruited as editor his contemporary, Chen Duxiu, who was of similar political ideology.

The vast majority of each issue of The Tiger was "lengthy, logically argued, academic-style essays on government". These essays often treated Western liberalism or the state's relation to its people. Nevertheless, a given issue also allowed space for other inclusions like current events, essays in translation, and the occasional work of literature. Operation of the magazine continued, with several months of interruption, from May 1914 until October 1915, producing a total of ten issues. The majority of the writings were done in classical Chinese prose, greatly limiting exposure to the Chinese public at large. Nevertheless, The Tiger was a very influential political journal during its span of print.

In the late stages of The Tiger's existence, Chen Duxiu began his next project, La Jeunesse, for which he began to advertise in The Tiger. Though the two publications eventually shared many of the same writers and much of the same spirit, Chen Duxiu felt that discourse concerning contemporary politics was less important than galvanizing Chinese youth culture. The Tiger dissolved shortly after its sister publication came into being in 1915.
