= Zhang Yong =

Zhang Yong may refer to:

- Zhang Yong (eunuch) (1465–1529), Chinese eunuch
- Jack Yung Chang (Zhang Yong) (1911–1939), Chinese historian of mathematics
- Zhang Yong (politician) (born 1953), former director of the China Food and Drug Administration
- Zhang Yong (agronomist) (born 1956), Chinese agronomist
- Zhang Yong (restaurateur), Chinese billionaire restaurateur, founder of Haidilao
- Daniel Zhang or Zhang Yong (born 1972), CEO of Alibaba Group
- Zhang Yong (real estate developer), founder of Xinyuan Real Estate
- Zhang Yong (snooker player) (born 1995), Chinese snooker player
