= Gong Zhenzhou =

Chinese revolutionary soldier

Gong Zhenzhou 龚 镇洲
- Born: 1882; Hefei, Anhui, Qing China
- Died: July 29, 1942 (aged 59–60); Guilin, Guangxi, Republic of China
- Other name: Gong Zhenpeng (龚振鵬)
- Occupations: Soldier, Revolutionary
- Political party: Tongmenghui
- Spouse: Xu Wen
- Children: Gong Pusheng (daughter); Gong Peng (daughter); Xu Wanqiu (daughter)

Chinese name
- Simplified Chinese: 龚镇洲
- Traditional Chinese: 龔鎮洲
Transcriptions
Standard Mandarin
- Hanyu Pinyin: Gōng Zhènzhōu

Gong Zhenzhou (龚镇洲) (1882-1942) was a Chinese soldier and revolutionary. He was named Zhenpeng at birth and later used the courtesy name Zhenzhou. A native of Changfeng, Hefei, Anhui, his ancestral home is Linchuan, Jiangxi.

== Biography ==
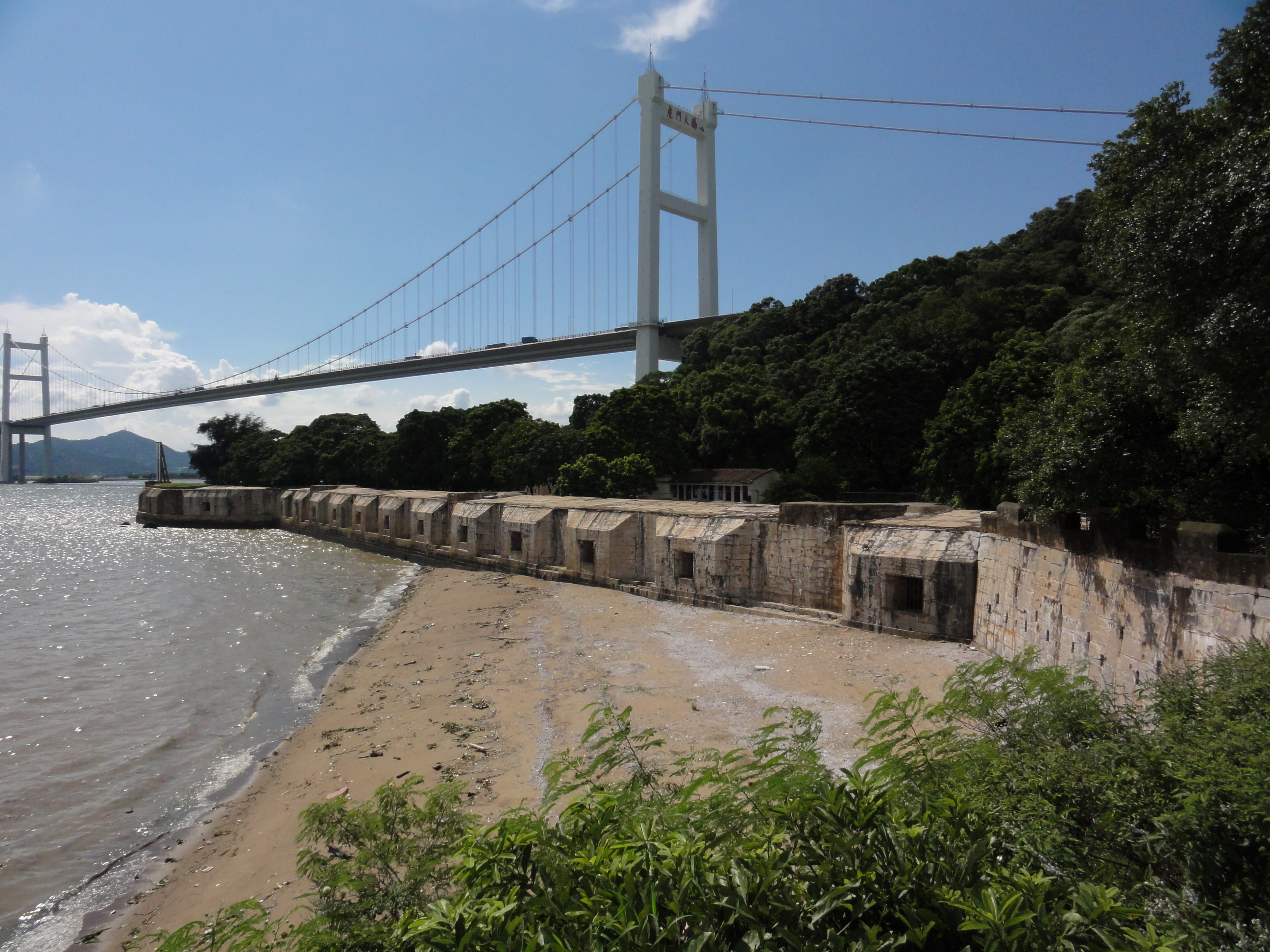
Weiyuan Fort, a Qing Dynasty coastal fort in Humen on the Pearl River Delta

In 1906, Gong Zhenzhou was a junior officer serving in the New Army's Ninth Division at Nanjing, and joined the Tongmenghui at the same time as his battalion commander, Bai Wenwei. On November 4, 1911, an uprising broke out in Qingjiang. He was the first person in the Jiangsu and Anhui regions to respond to the Wuchang Uprising. Later, Gong Zhenzhou served as the commander of the Second Brigade of Bai Wenwei's Revolutionary First Army. During the Second Revolution in 1913, Gong Zhenzhou served as commander of the Second Army and led his troops to regain Wuhu. After its failure, he was proscribed and fled to Japan. On returning to China in 1917, he joined Sun Yat-sen's military government in Guangzhou and served as the commander of Humen Fort.

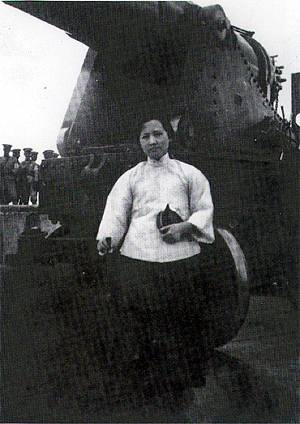
Madame Sun Yat-sen at Weiyuan Fort, Humen

When the Constitutional Protection Movement collapsed, Gong withdrew to Shanghai with his family, in far from well-off circumstances and ran an apartment block. He became increasingly sympathetic to anti-Chiang activities, after the April 12 Incident. Following the Shanghai Incident in 1932, Gong traveled to Beijing with his friend Zhang Taiyan and urged Zhang Xueliang to send troops to save the country. After that, Gong Zhenzhou traveled between Sichuan, Yunnan, and Guangxi, calling for resistance against Japan. Later, Zhou Enlai, head of the Chinese Communist Party delegation in Chongqing, hosted a banquet for Gong Zhenzhou in Chongqing. In July 1942, Gong Zhenzhou fell ill and died in Guilin. Zhou Enlai, Dong Biwu, and Deng Yingchao jointly sent a message of condolences: "Mr. Zhenzhou, a man of virtue and talent, who made great contributions to the Republic of China. ... We are deeply saddened by the sudden death!" At that time, Gong Zhenzhou's second daughter Gong Peng was assisting Zhou Enlai.

== Family ==
Gong married Xu Wen, a cousin of the revolutionary Xu Zonghan, who was the second-wife of Huang Xing. The couple had three daughters: Gong Pusheng, Gong Peng and Xu Wanqiu.
