= Qiao Guanhua =

Chinese diplomat (1913–1983)

- 乔冠华
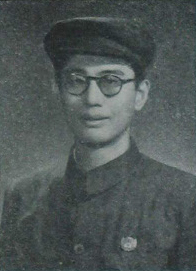
- Qiao in 1949

4th Minister of Foreign Affairs
- In office 18 November 1973 – 2 December 1976
- Premier: Zhou Enlai
- Preceded by: Ji Pengfei
- Succeeded by: Huang Hua

Personal details
- Born: March 28, 1913 Yancheng, Jiangsu, Republic of China
- Died: September 22, 1983 (aged 70) Beijing, People's Republic of China
- Party: Chinese Communist Party (1942-1983)
- Spouse(s): Gong Peng (1943–1970, her death); Zhang Hanzhi (1973–1983, his death)
- Education: Tsinghua University

Qiao Guanhua
- Traditional Chinese: 喬冠華
- Simplified Chinese: 乔冠华
Transcriptions
Standard Mandarin
- Hanyu Pinyin: Qiáo Guānhuá
- Wade–Giles: Ch'iao Kuan-hua

Qiao Guanhua (Chinese: 乔冠华; Wade–Giles: Ch'iao Kuan-hua; March 28, 1913 – September 22, 1983) was a politician and diplomat in the People's Republic of China and played an important role in the talks with United States on the opening of China and the drafting of the Shanghai Communiqué.

== Early life and revolution ==
Qiao Guanhua was born in Yancheng in 1913; his father was a local land-owner, considered relatively illuminated. Since his childhood, Qiao Guanhua showed a great intelligence, especially remarkable memory, so he repeatedly skipped school grades, and was admitted to the Tsinghua University at the age of 16. While he was studying philosophy there, he came in contact with Marxism and engaged in several activities led by the Chinese Communist Party (CCP).

Qiao Guanhua graduated in 1933 and went to Japan to continue his studies at the Tokyo Imperial University. He joined the Japanese Communist Party, leading to his expulsion from the university. He was then forced to travel to Germany, where he obtained a PhD at the University of Tübingen in 1937, when he was 24 years old.

As he returned in China, Second Sino-Japanese War had broken out. Qiao Guanhua engaged mainly in journalism with the pen name of Qiaomu (喬木, meaning Tree, also the pen name of Hu Qiaomu), working on the international review of several newspapers in Hong Kong.

Admitted to the CCP in the autumn of 1942, Qiao Guanhua was called to Chongqing to take charge of The Masses' Weekly and the international column of the Xinhua Daily. In Chongqing, he worked directly under Zhou Enlai, who recognized his interest in foreign affairs and took him as his personal assistant for international matters. With Zhou's encouragement, he married Gong Peng, another of Zhou's protegees. After the war, he accompanied Zhou Enlai to Shanghai with the CCP delegation, and there he established the English-language Xinhua Weekly. At the end of 1946, he returned to Hong Kong as president of the local Xinhua News Agency branch.

== After the establishment of the People's Republic of China ==
After the establishment of the People's Republic of China, Qiao Guanhua continued to work in foreign affairs. He served as head of the Information Bureau of the Ministry of Foreign Affairs of the People's Republic of China, deputy director of the General Office of the Central People's Government, vice-president of the Chinese People's Institute of Foreign Affairs, head of the Asia Department of the Ministry of Foreign Affairs, and vice-minister of Foreign Affairs.

Qiao Guanhua took part at several international delegations. In 1950, he accompanied Special Representative Wu Xiuquan to the United Nations Security Council to protest against the United States's shielding of Chiang Kai-shek's regime in Taiwan; in 1951 he was major consultant to the head of the Chinese delegation to the Panmunjeom talks during the Korean War; in April 1954 accompanied Zhou Enlai to the Geneva Conference on Indochina, and once again traveled to the 1961–1962 Geneva summit on Laos with Chen Yi.

== The Cultural Revolution ==
With the outbreak of the Cultural Revolution in 1966, Qiao Guanhua was denounced along with Chen Yi and Ji Pengfei as a counterrevolutionary, but Premier Zhou Enlai protected them and they survived the turmoil of that period. In 1969, Qiao was appointed head of the Chinese delegation for the talks with the Soviet Union regarding the Zhenbao Island, where military fighting had erupted. In 1971, he led the Chinese delegation to the 26th Session of the United Nations General Assembly when China's seat was handed over to the People's Republic of China, and continued to lead Chinese delegations to the UN until 1976. In 1972, when President of the United States Richard Nixon visited China, he was put in charge of negotiations with Henry Kissinger and drafting the joint communiqué.

In 1973, due to the success of the Sino-U.S. negotiations, and after a personal commendation by Mao, Qiao Guanhua took on increasingly important roles. He was elected a member of the Central Committee of the Chinese Communist Party, and later was appointed Minister of Foreign Affairs in 1974, confirmed by the 4th National People's Congress in 1975. However, in this period, he was perceived as supporting the Gang of Four; in particular, he made a speech denouncing his former mentor Zhou Enlai. He later made an apology to Zhou, which was accepted.

Following Mao Zedong's death in 1976 and the Gang's arrest, Qiao was quickly removed from office and replaced as Foreign Minister by Huang Hua, though he nominally remained an adviser to the Chinese People's Association for Friendship with Foreign Countries. In 1982, he was allowed to resume political activities. He died of cancer in September 1983, aged 70.

== Personal life ==
Qiao Guanhua married diplomat Gong Peng in 1943. They had a son, Qiao Zonghuai, who served as vice-minister of Foreign Affairs. Their daughter, Qiao Songdu, graduated from Tianjin Medical University. In 2008, she finished the book ‹Qiao Guanhua and Gong Peng – My father and my mother›. In 1970, Gong Peng died of a cerebral hemorrhage. In 1973, Qiao Guanhua married Zhang Hanzhi, adopted daughter of the revolutionary journalist Zhang Shizhao and English interpreter for chairman Mao, after she divorced Hong Junyan. Hung Huang is Qiao Guanhua's stepdaughter.

Government offices
Preceded by Ji Pengfei	Foreign Minister of the People's Republic of China; 1974–1976	Succeeded by Huang Hua
