= Hung Huang =

Chinese television host, author, and actress

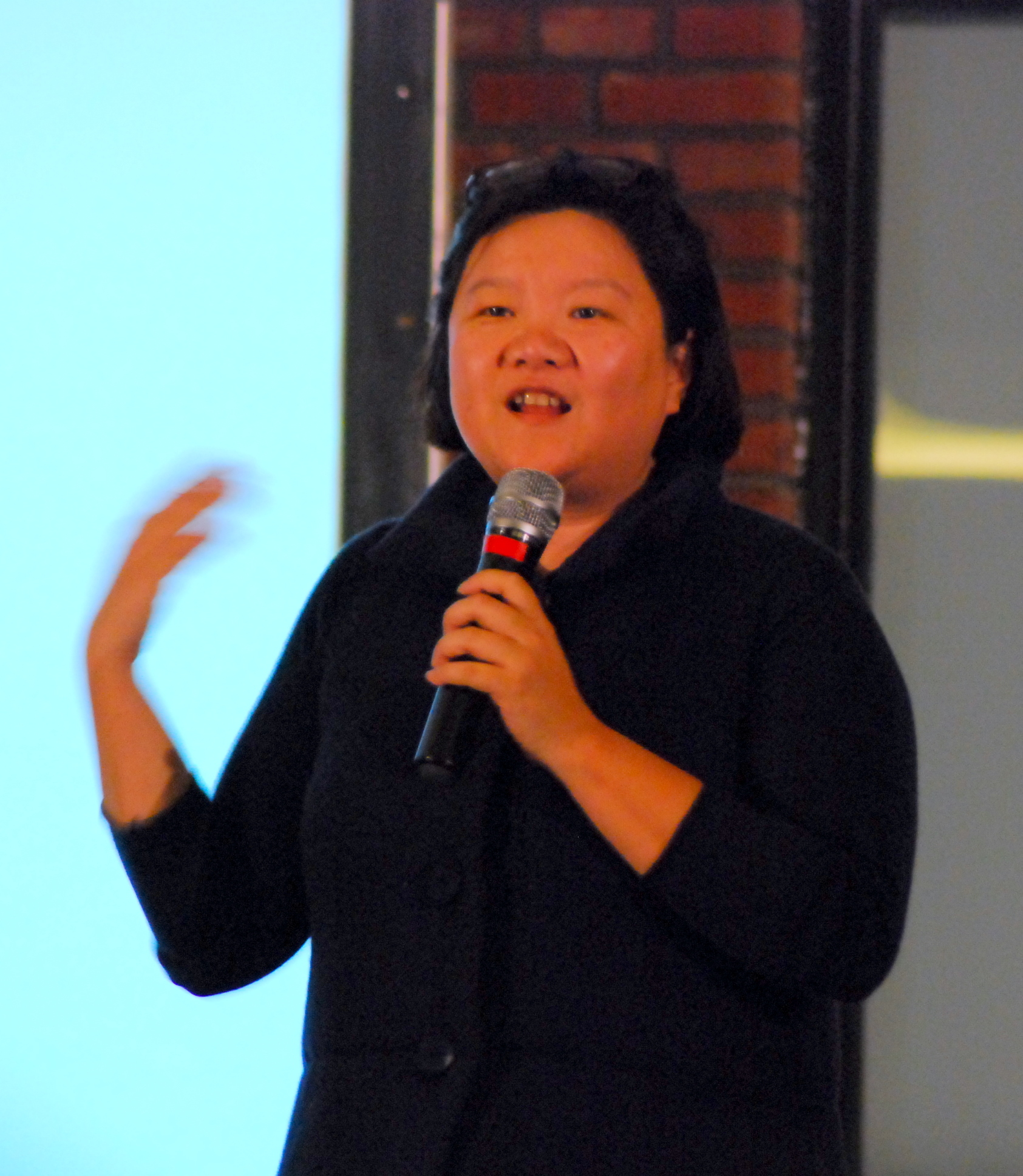
- Hung in 2009
- Born: July 16, 1962 (age 64); Beijing, China
- Citizenship: American
- Education: Vassar College
- Occupation: Media figure
- Spouses: Andrew Yu (m. 1983–1985) Chen Kaige (m. 1989–1991) Pon Sai (m. 1993–2005) Yang Xiaoping (m. 2005)
- Children: 1 (adopted)
- Parents: Zhang Hanzhi (mother); Hong Junyan (father); Qiao Guanhua (stepfather)

Hung Huang (Chinese: 洪晃; pinyin: Hóng Huàng; born 16 July 1962) is a Chinese-American media figure. Daughter of Zhang Hanzhi and stepdaughter of Qiao Guanhua, Hung established a media career in the 2000s, gaining public attention for the contrast between her "red aristocracy" background and her irreverent, free-spirited public persona. She served as publisher of the fashion magazine iLook from 1999 to 2015.

== Personal life ==
Hung was born to Zhang Hanzhi, who would become the English tutor of Mao Zedong, and Hong Junyan (洪君彦), an economist. Her parents divorced in 1973. Zhang then married Qiao Guanhua, the Foreign Minister of the People's Republic of China in the 1970s. After the Cultural Revolution, Hung's mother was accused of collaborating with the Gang of Four and was placed under house arrest for two years.

In 1974, Hung, at the age of 12, was sent to America to study. She graduated from Vassar College in 1984.

Hung married four times. Her second husband is the film director Chen Kaige. In 2006, Hung adopted a daughter from Sichuan.

== Career ==
After college, Hung worked as a consultant and comprador in both China and the US until 1999, when she took over the fashion magazine Look, later known as iLook, from its founder Jane Huang, wife of Tan Dun. Apart from being the publisher, Hung was also the magazine's editor-in-chief since August 2006. The magazine published its last issue in December 2015.

In the late 2000s and early 2010s, Hung is sometimes compared by Western media to China's Oprah Winfrey or Anna Wintour. Since early 2012, she has written a weekly column called ChinaFile for Women's Wear Daily. She has been selected by the Time magazine as one of the world's 100 most influential people in 2011.
