= Gong Peng =

Chinese Communist diplomat

Madame Gong Peng 龔澎
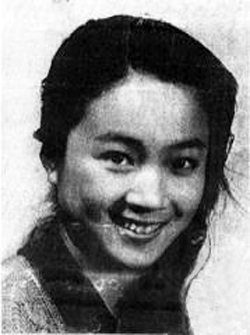
- Gong Peng as a youth
- Born: Gong Cisheng (龔慈生); October 10, 1914; Yokohama, Kanagawa Prefecture, Japan
- Died: September 28, 1970 (aged 55); Beijing, People's Republic of China
- Other name: Gong Weihang (龔維航)
- Occupations: Official, spokeswoman
- Spouse(s): Liu Wenhua (1938–1942); Qiao Guanhua (1943–1970)
- Parents: Gong Zhenzhou (father); Xu Wen (mother)
- Relatives: Gong Pusheng (sister); Xu Wanqiu (sister)

Chinese name
- Simplified Chinese: 龚澎
- Traditional Chinese: 龔澎
Transcriptions
Standard Mandarin
- Hanyu Pinyin: Gōng Péng
- Gwoyeu Romatzyh: Gong Perng
- Wade–Giles: Kung¹ P'êng²

Gong Peng (October 10, 1914 – September 20, 1970), born Gong Cisheng and also known as Gong Weihang, was a Chinese wartime spokeswoman for the Chinese Communist Party. After 1949 she was an official in the Ministry of Foreign Affairs of the People's Republic of China, and was head of the Bureau of Information, the first woman to head a department.

== Family ==
Gong Peng's mother was Xu Wen (徐文). Her father, Gong Zhenzhou, was a revolutionary colleague of Sun Yat-sen, was politically active in Anhui following the 1911 Revolution, Chiang Kai-shek's classmate in the Baoding Military Academy, and a military leader in the Canton Military Government in 1917. Gong Peng was born in Yokohama, Japan, where her father had gone to be safe from political enemies in China. Her birthname, "Cisheng", meant "Compassion for All Living Things". She was the second of three daughters. Her older sister was Gong Pusheng (龔普生), who was also an activist in the 1930s and joined the Communist Party in 1939. After 1949, she was Ministry of Foreign Affairs, International Treaty and Law Secretary, and first Ambassador to Ireland. The youngest sister was Xu Wanqiu (徐畹球).

When Gong Zhenzhou died in 1942, Communist Party leaders Zhou Enlai and Dong Biwu sent messages of condolence, and Chiang Kai-shek sent an elegiac couplet.

Gong Peng's first husband was Liu Wenhua (劉文華), who was killed in 1942. Her second husband, Qiao Guanhua, whom she married in 1943, was a leading diplomat and one of Zhou Enlai's trusted deputies.

== Education and joining the Chinese Communist Party ==
Gong Zhenzhou provided his daughters a good education in spite of the family's lack of money. After graduating from St. Mary's Hall, Shanghai, Gong Peng and Gong Pusheng both studied at Yenching University, a leading Christian university.

The two sisters were active in the anti-Japanese December 9th Movement of 1935, which centered on Yenching. At that time neither of them were Communists, and came from Christian households and worked in the YWCA. To break the news blockade on student agitation imposed by the Nationalist Government, Gong Pusheng, in her capacity as vice-president of the Yenching University Students Union, and Gong Peng, also a student leader, held a press conference on campus informing foreign journalists about the movement. Among those present was American journalist Edgar Snow. Snow and his wife, Nym Wales, encouraged and supported the students, who often met at their house, and became especially close to the Gong sisters. When Snow returned from his secret visit to Mao Zedong's headquarters in Shaanxi, a friend shared the manuscript of his Red Star Over China with Gong, and she saw Mao for the first time in the short films Snow shot.

In 1936 Gong joined the Chinese Communist Party, then in 1937 graduated with a degree in history. After the Marco Polo Bridge Incident, as war broke out, Gong moved to Shanghai, where she taught at St. Maria's school from November 1937 to March 1938.

== Communist Party voice in wartime ==
In fall of 1938, Gong joined the exodus of young progressives to Mao Zedong's newly established wartime capital, Yan'an. She became one of the first students at the Yan'an Institute of Marxism–Leninism. On a chance encounter with Mao, she told him that at Yenching she had changed her name from "Gong Cisheng" to "Gong Weihang", meaning "Gong 'Sustain the Voyage'", then when she arrived in Yan'an, changed it once again, this time to "Gong Peng", after the early Chinese Communist peasant organizer and martyr Peng Pai. Mao approved. (Peng Pai had also been a Christian for a time.) She attended Mao's lectures and became his translator when he greeted English speaking guests. She was assigned to the Xinhua Daily North China edition, and got to know deputy commander of the Eighteenth Army Peng Dehuai. From October 1938 to October 1940, Gong served as the National Revolutionary Army Tenth Eighth Army headquarters secretary. In 1938, she fell in love with and married Liu Wenhua.

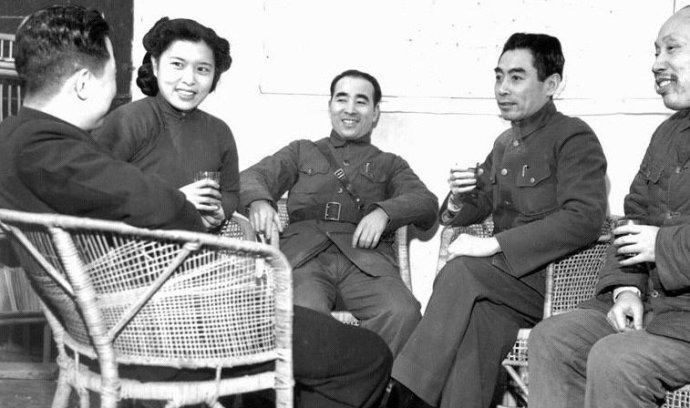
Dong Biwu, Gong Peng, Lin Biao, and Zhou Enlai 1940

In 1939, in response to Mao's directive to place even greater weight on foreign propaganda, the Party formed a Foreign Affairs Small Group, whose members included Wang Bingnan, Chen Jiakang, and Gong Peng, a group that stayed together and formed the nucleus of the Foreign Ministry a decade later. The Party leadership expected them to brief them on world developments and to cultivate good relations with foreign journalists, diplomats, and soldiers. Gong was transferred to the Eighth Route Army in Chongqing, an assignment that lasted from December 1940 to October 1946. She served as a journalist for Xinhua Daily and Secretary of CPC Delegation to Chongqing, which was headed by Zhou Enlai. Meanwhile, in June 1942, Liu Wenhua was killed making his way back from the headquarters of the Eighth Route Army in Jinzhong. In late autumn 1943, at Zhou's suggestion, Gong and Qiao Guanhua were married. Mao Zedong praised the newlyweds for "leading the marriage revolution for thousands of miles". In July 1944, she gave birth to their first son, who later served as People's Republic of China Ministry of Foreign Affairs Deputy Minister. During the negotiations with the Nationalists, which included American diplomats who did not speak Chinese, Gong was at Mao's side. Gong also met with Chongqing intellectuals, some of whom she introduced to the CPC, such as architect Liang Sicheng. Gong Pusheng introduced K. H. Ting, whom she had known in the student department of the YMCA, to one of her Yenching classmates, who became his wife.

Zhou Enlai and Gong paid special attention to American diplomats and reporters. One observer recalled later that the Communists in Chongqing were "still an isolated group of underdogs and no sense of menace attached to them". Time magazine correspondent, Theodore White called Gong "the most beautiful Chinese woman I ever encountered", and the historian John K. Fairbank, then an officer in the wartime O.S.S., wrote to his wife that Gong was the "official appointee for contact with barbarians", with a "taming effect on everybody I know", mentioning in particular Brooks Atkinson of The New York Times, and Joseph Alsop, an aide to Claire Chennault. The journalist Eric Sevareid felt that Gong was less an object of sexual desire than a kind of unattainable beauty, inspiring a courtly devotion. He wrote that "more than a few foreign correspondents and diplomats fancied themselves in love with her -- but it was a little too much like falling in love with Joan of Arc." The foreign press corps and diplomats arranged for Gong Peng to see an American navy doctor when she came down with dysentery and planned to protest if the Nationalist secret police arrested her. When a thief reached through the window of their apartment and stole Qiao and Gong Peng's entire wardrobe, John Fairbank lent Qiao one of his tailored suits. After 1949, however, when she came across foreign acquaintances, she avoided contact or reprimanded them.

The American Foreign Service Officer John S. Service was later accused of having a sexual relation with Gong, with no proof.

After the war, an American woman journalist transported Gong's baby son to her family in Shanghai. Gong went to Hong Kong, where she stayed from October 1946 to August 1949. She began to express public criticism of the United States, charging that the country was moving towards fascism. She edited the English language China Digest (中国文摘 Zhongguo wen zhai), a weekly outlet for the Party, under the pseudonym Djoong Wai-Lo (鍾威洛), and was a member of the Hong Kong branch of several bureaus. She was responsible for the founding of the Hong Kong Xinhua Weekly the semi-official news organ.

== Career after 1949 ==
When the People's Republic of China was established in 1949, Gong Peng joined the Foreign Service, with Zhou Enlai as Foreign Minister. She was head of the Information Department, the first woman to be a department head, and continued in that post until she became assistant minister in 1964. Since Mao Zedong demanded control of all decisions concerning foreign affairs, even the smallest details, Zhou kept the most experienced senior diplomats in Beijing and did not appoint veterans from the days in Yan'an or Chongqing to be ambassadors. Zhou trusted these senior aides with critical missions and running the Foreign Affairs Ministry with only a small central staff.

Gong also served as private secretary to Zhou and sometimes acted as liaison to her one-time Christian colleagues in building the Three-Self Patriotic Movement that organized Christians in a government sanctioned group. At Zhou's suggestion, for instance, she arranged a dinner at Zhou's home in Zhongnanhai with Bishop K. H. Ting, with whom she had worked in the 1930s. Among her longtime friends was Han Suyin, a classmate from Yenching who became a best-selling author who was sympathetic to the Chinese Communist Revolution.

At the 1954 Geneva Conference Gong and Huang Hua, another graduate of Yenching University, held a number of press conferences., but objected when a photographer took her picture lighting a cigarette. She stayed in seclusion at her hotel, described by a journalist as a "brooding, grave-faced woman in a filmy blue dress". She organized a tour for foreign correspondents in 1955 to investigate and conduct interviews in Tibet. She helped produce a film, "中印边界问题真相" (Sino-Indian boundary question: the truth) that won The Hundred Flowers Award for Best Long Documentary. According to Gong's daughter Qiao Songdu, Gong lived a simple life during her diplomatic career, and would only wear cheongsam on formal occasions.

The Foreign Ministry was targeted by ultra-leftists during the Cultural Revolution. Red Guard student groups pillaged Gong's home, and many of her colleagues at the Foreign Ministry were pressured or sent to labor camps. Gong was exhausted by overwork, leading to hypertension. On September 20, 1970, she died of a cerebral hemorrhage in Beijing at the age of 55. 49 years later, Hua Chunying became the second female director-general of the Information Department after Gong Peng.

== In popular culture ==
Zhang Ziyi plays Gong Peng in the film The Founding of a Republic.

== Notes ==
Government offices
New title	Director-General of the Information Department of the Ministry of Foreign Affairs of China; 1949–1964	Succeeded by Qin Jialin
