= Zhang Hanzhi =

Chinese diplomat and translator (1935–2008)

- Born: 章含之; 14 July 1935; Shanghai, Republic of China
- Died: 26 January 2008 (aged 72); Beijing, People's Republic of China
- Education: Beijing Foreign Studies University
- Occupations: Translator, diplomat
- Spouses: Hong Junyan (m. 1957–1972) Qiao Guanhua (m. 1973; died 1983)
- Children: Hung Huang
- Parent(s): Zhang Shizhao (adoptive father); Tan Xueqing (biological mother); Chen Du (biological father)

Zhang Hanzhi (Chinese: 章含之; pinyin: Zhāng Hánzhī; Wade–Giles: Chang^{1} Han^{2}-chih^{1}; 14 July 1935 – 26 January 2008) was a Chinese diplomat. An adopted daughter of Zhang Shizhao, she became Mao Zedong's English teacher and Richard Nixon's interpreter during his historic 1972 trip to China.

== Early life and education ==
Zhang was born in Shanghai in 1935, the love child of socialite Tan Xueqing and Chen Du, son of General Chen Tiaoyuan. She was adopted by General Chen's friend, educator and statesman Zhang Shizhao. Her family moved to Beijing in 1949 and four years later, Zhang entered the Beijing Foreign Studies University, where she taught after graduating with a master's degree.

== Career ==
Zhang first met Mao Zedong in 1950. She started to know him and translate English for him. The lessons stopped in 1964 as the Cultural Revolution began taking shape. In 1971, Zhang was transferred to China's Ministry of Foreign Affairs, marking the beginning of her diplomatic career. During the preparatory phase of U.S. President Richard Nixon's 1972 visit to China, Zhang served as an interpreter during a series of preliminary meetings led by U.S. National Security Advisor Henry Kissinger in Beijing. During Nixon's official visit, Zhang was assigned as the personal interpreter for First Lady Pat Nixon and also handled interpretation duties during the Nixons' cultural visits and public engagements. While Ji Chaozhu served as the primary interpreter for President Nixon and was responsible for translation at official banquets, a reassignment was made after Nixon suggested to Premier Zhou Enlai that Ji's height was similar to his own and suggested that a female interpreter might be more favorable for his public image. Ji and Zhang subsequently agreed that Ji would continue his role during official functions in Beijing, while Zhang would take over banquet interpretation duties in other cities. As a result, Zhang served as interpreter during banquets in Hangzhou and Shanghai.

== Personal life ==
Zhang married her first husband Hong Junyan (洪君彦), a Peking University professor, in 1949. Zhang and Hong had a daughter, Hung Huang, who later became an entrepreneur and media figure.

In his memoir, Hong Junyan states that when he was persecuted and humiliated at the beginning of the Cultural Revolution, Zhang Hanzhi offered no sympathy and instead despised him. She began an affair with a colleague at the Beijing Foreign Languages Institute, and was caught in the act by Hong's sister. In 1969, Hong was sent to perform manual labour in Jiangxi Province, and when he returned to Beijing in 1971, rumours were circulating that Zhang was having an affair with Qiao Guanhua, the head of China's UN delegation. Zhang requested a divorce in December 1972, which was finalized in March 1973, and Zhang married Qiao afterwards.

Zhang died on 26 January 2008, due to a lung-related illness.
