= Twenty-sixth session of the United Nations General Assembly =

- 21 September 1971 – 18 September 1972 26th session 26th general debate
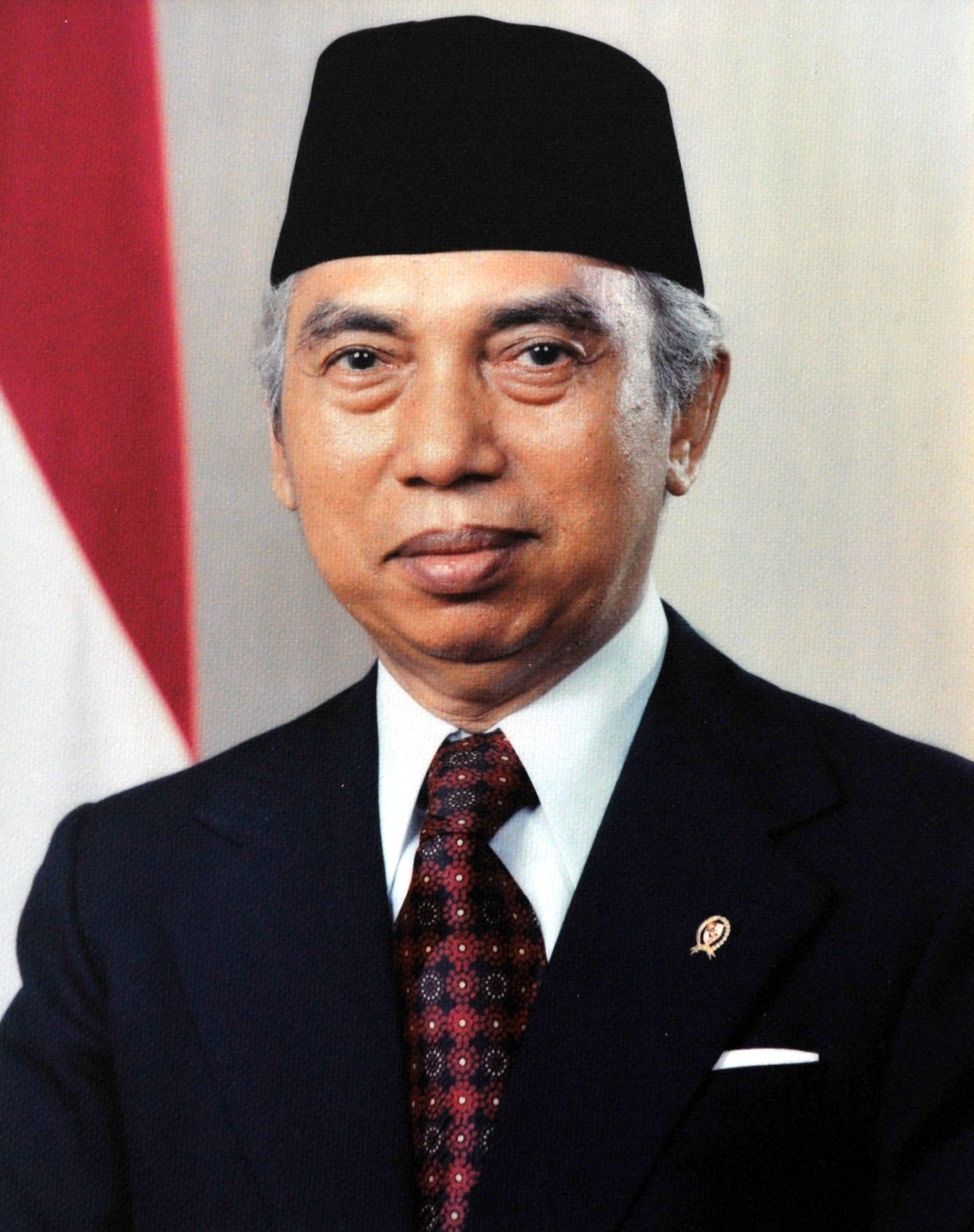
- President of the 26th General Assembly, Adam Malik
- Host country: United Nations
- Participants: United Nations Member States
- President: Adam Malik
- Secretary-General: U Thant

The twenty-sixth session of the United Nations General Assembly opened on 21 September 1971 at the UN Headquarters in New York. The president was Indonesian diplomat Adam Malik, previously Minister of Foreign Affairs of Indonesia, later becoming its Vice President. The Assembly admitted three new member states — Bhutan, Bahrain and Qatar — bringing total membership to 130.

The session saw the adoption on 25 October 1971 of Resolution 2758(XXVI), titled Restoration of the lawful rights of the People's Republic of China in the United Nations. The resolution, passed by a vote of 76 in favour, 35 against, and 17 abstentions, Diplomats of the People's Republic of China, took their seats in the General Assembly on November 15, and as a permanent member of the Security Council a week later.
