= Stanisław Trepczyński =

Polish diplomat (1924–2002)

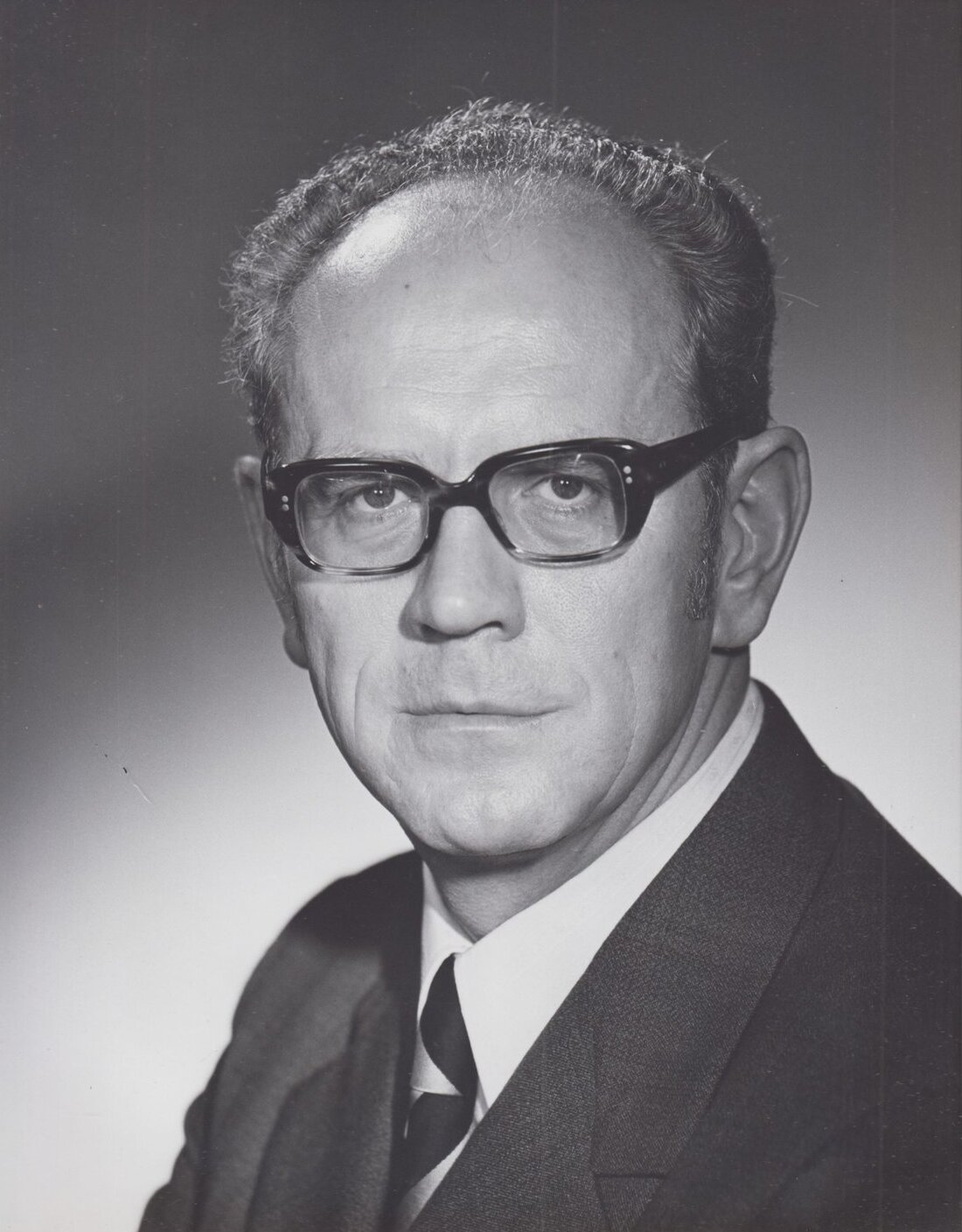
- Trepczyński, c. 1972
- Born: 7 April 1924; Łódź, Poland
- Died: 20 June 2002 (aged 78)
- Education: University of Łódź
- Occupation: Diplomat

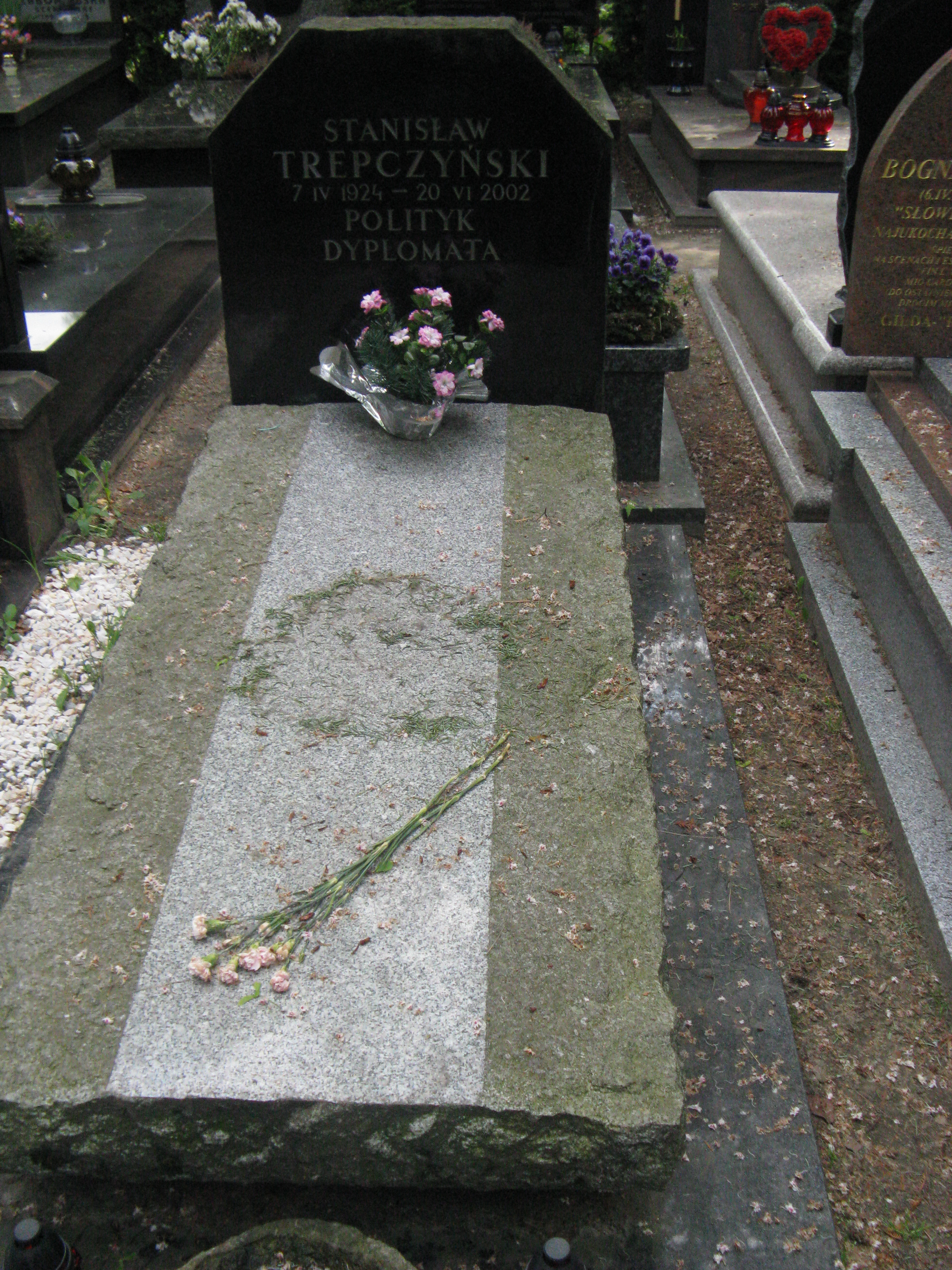
The grave of Stanisław Trepczyński at the Powązki Military Cemetery

Stanisław Trepczyński (7 April 1924 – 20 June 2002) was a Polish diplomat, who served as the 27th president of the United Nations General Assembly from 1972 to 1973.

== Early life and education ==
Trepczyński was born in Łódź, Poland, on 7 April 1924. His father was a lawyer.

Trepczyński was a graduate of University of Łódź and received a master's degree in economics.

== Career ==
Trepczyński joined the Łódź Committee of the Polish Workers Party (later the Polish United Worker's Party) in 1946. In 1951, he became the secretary of the Polish peace committee. He was appointed deputy minister of foreign affairs in 1971. From 1972 to 1973 he served as the 27th president of the United Nations General Assembly.

== Personal life ==
Trepczyński married twice and had three sons.
