= Jack Yung Chang =

Chinese historian of mathematics (1911–1939)

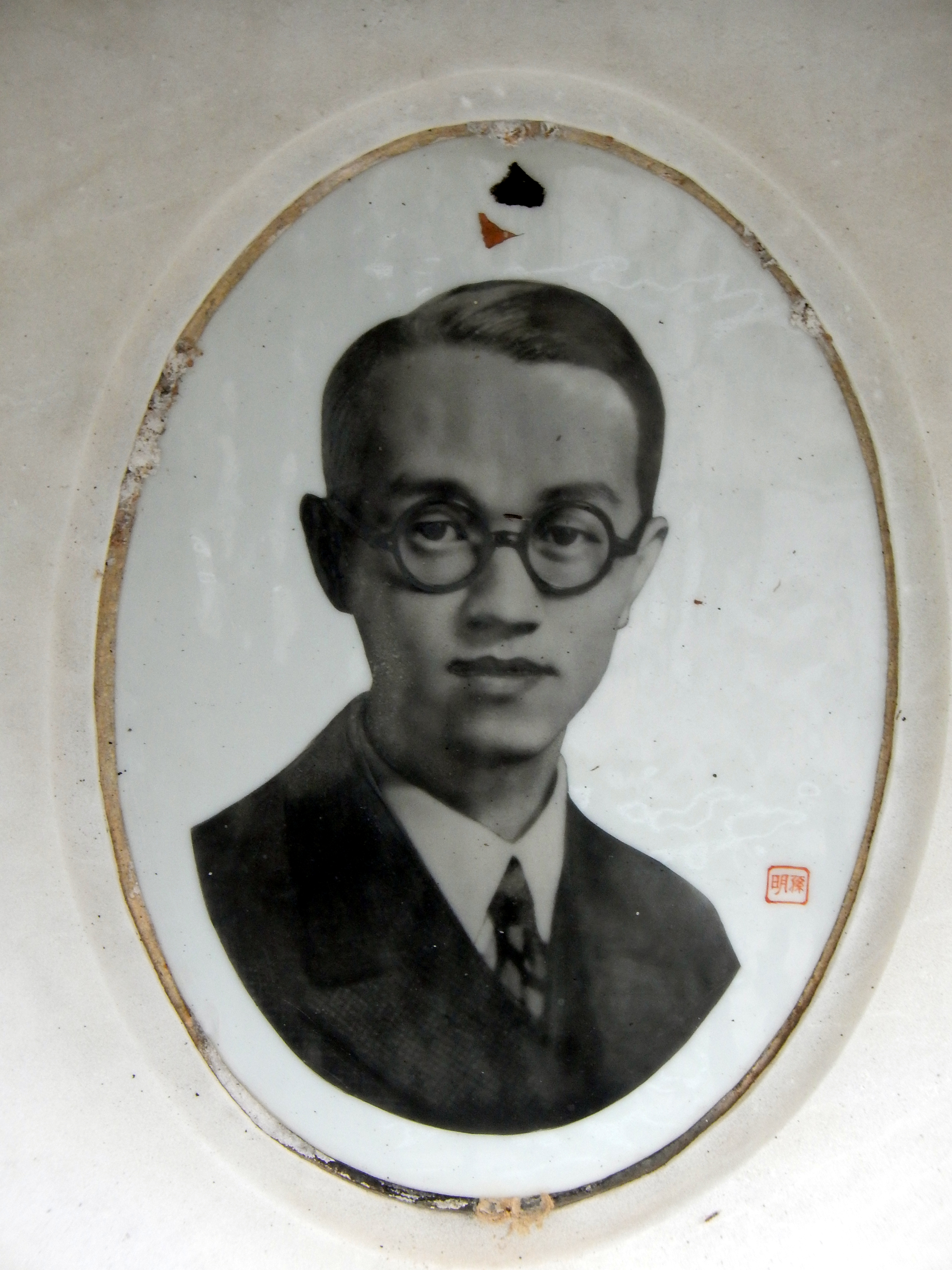
Jack Yung Chang

Jack Yung Chang (Note: As on his tombstone.) (Chinese: 章用; pinyin: Zhāng Yòng; Wade–Giles: Chang Yung; 9 March 1911 – 16 December 1939), courtesy name Junzhi (Chinese: 俊之; pinyin: Jùnzhī; Wade–Giles: Chün-chih), was a Chinese historian of mathematics. His most significant work was on calendar systems in Asia.

== Biography ==
Yung Chang was the second son of Chinese politician Zhang Shizhao. His mother was Wu Ruonan (Chinese: 吳弱男), a feminist and the first female member of Kuomintang. He was born in Aberdeen, Scotland, and soon returned to China with his mother. He and his two brothers were home-schooled in Beiping. Among their teachers was Li Dazhao, one of the founders of Chinese Communist Party and a friend of Zhang Shizhao.

At age 17, he went to Britain with his parents, then to Germany to learn German and French. In the spring of 1930, he took the national matriculation examination for foreigners in Berlin and was ranked second out of three thousand candidates from over ten countries. He entered University of Göttingen to study mathematics, and he also took classes in physics, chemistry, philosophy and Latin. He met Otto E. Neugebauer and was impressed by his research on Babylonian and Egyptian mathematics. Chang was well learned in classical Chinese literature from his upbringing, and he knew English, French, German, Latin and Greek well, so he was able to research in ancient Chinese texts and Western works.

Chang was a reclusive person and did not mingle with other Chinese students, of which there were but a handful. However, when Ji Xianlin arrived in Göttingen in 1935, due to Ji's wide range of interests in literature, arts and religion, Chang and Ji became good friends. Chang showed Ji around the city and helped Ji settle down, and he often visited Ji and stayed for long hours. His mother told Ji that Chang seemed to have changed to a different person after knowing Ji.

In the summer of 1936, due to financial troubles, Chang returned to China and taught at National Shantung University. The following year, when the Second Sino-Japanese War had just started, he was invited to the Department of Mathematics of National Chekiang University to be a professor in the area of algebra, as there were none after Chiungtze Tsen's departure earlier that year.

On 8 September 1937, when Chang was on his way to National Chekiang University, he took a train from Shanghai to Hangzhou. At 12:20 pm, when the train stopped at Songjiang station, eight Japanese warplanes came and bombed the station. Chang held tightly in his arms a 1607 edition of the book Jihe Yuanben, Chinese translation of Euclid's Elements, which he had borrowed from Yu Ta-wei. The carriage which he was in was not destroyed, but 5 other carriages of the 10-carriage train were destroyed in the airstrike, more than 300 civilians were killed and more than 400 were injured.

Soon after Chang's arrival, the university was evacuated westwards, first from Hangzhou to Jiande in Zhejiang province, then to Taihe in Jiangxi province, and finally settled in Yishan in Guangxi province. He moved with the university and lived in harsh environment. According to the then department head Su Buqing, Chang had a remarkable perseverance; he went on teaching even when there were frequent Japanese airstrikes, and when students asked him where to hang the blackboard when everyone went hiding in airstrikes, he told them to hang it in front of his chest.

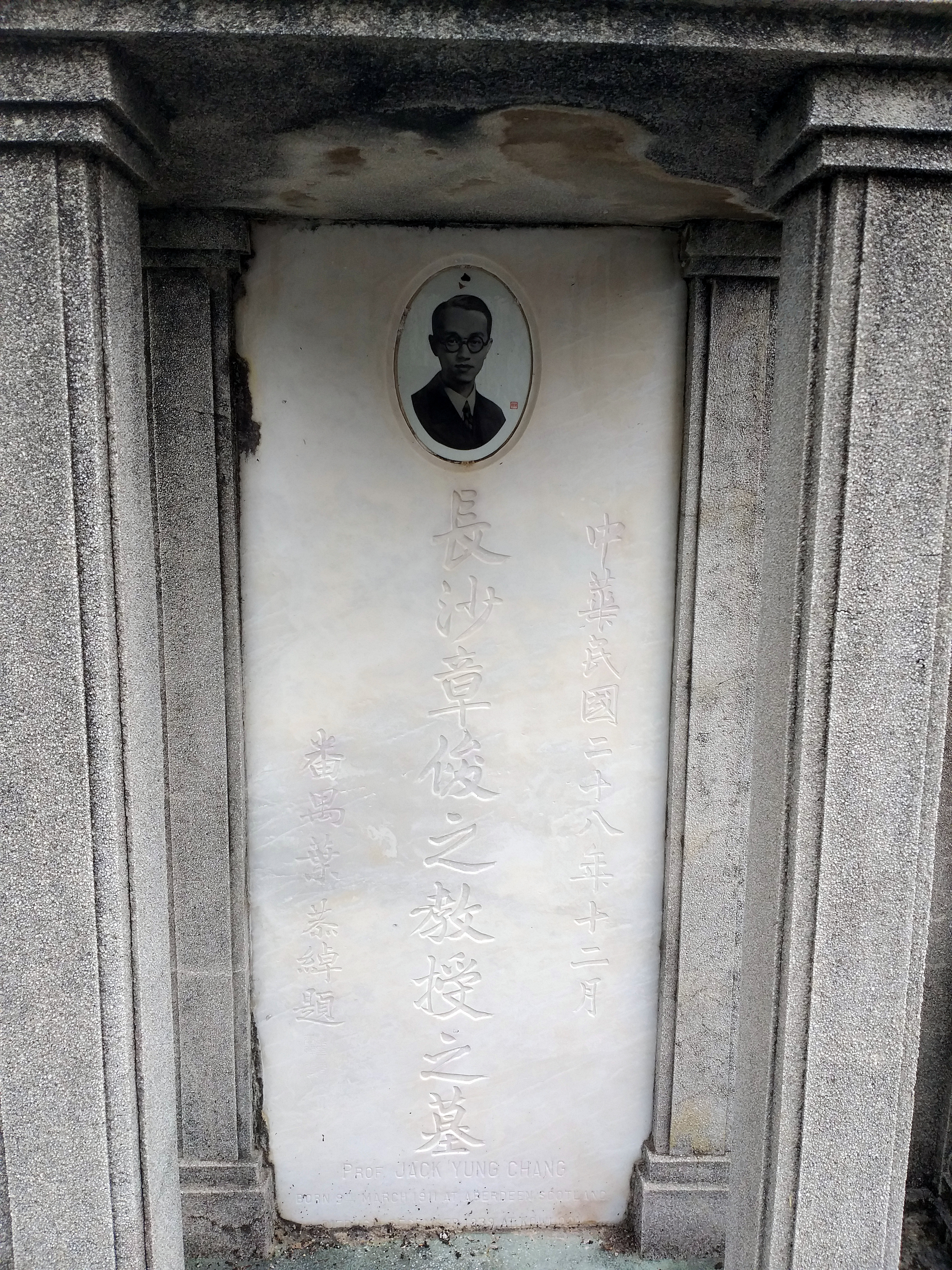
Tombstone of Jack Yung Chang

While in Taihe, he found out that he had lung disease after he coughed up blood. His mother, then living in Hong Kong, heard this and told him to go to Hong Kong by car for treatment. However, the university urged him to come back, so he went to Yishan passing through Vietnam.

He arrived in Hanoi on 22 October 1938. He visited the École française d'Extrême-Orient and discovered a number of ancient Vietnamese mathematics books written in literary Chinese, so he looked around and bought some copies of them and also some historical documents. He had planned to study the history of Vietnamese mathematics, but he only finished a paper on Vietnamese calendar before his death.

The hot climate, harsh living condition and frequent Japanese airstrikes at Yishan aggravated his sickness. He left the university for Hong Kong in March 1939, and he planned to go to Germany for further study. Unfortunately, his health deteriorated, and he was hospitalised for several months, where he still read his books and continued with his research. In December the same year, he became critically sick, and on his mother's request he was discharged from hospital and was carried back to his home in Kowloon. He was happy to see his books again, and he read them. He died at home after a fever around sunset the following day. He left his collection of books to the university library. He was unmarried. The university held a great memorial ceremony for him on 5 May 1940.

== Papers ==
- Part 1: Yung Chang (1937). "陽曆甲子考". 數學雜誌 (The Mathematical Gazette). 1 (1). The Chinese Mathematical Society: 42–56.

Part 2: Yung Chang (1937). "陽曆甲子考(續)". 數學雜誌 (The Mathematical Gazette). 1 (2). The Chinese Mathematical Society: 39–56.
Part 3: Yung Chang (1937). "陽曆甲子考(續)". 數學雜誌 (The Mathematical Gazette). 1 (3). The Chinese Mathematical Society: 51–56.

- Yung Chang (1939). "僰夷佛曆解". 科學 (Science) (in Chinese). 23 (9). The Science Society of China: 518–528.
- Yung Chang (1939). "垜積比類疏證". 科學 (Science). 23 (11). The Science Society of China: 647–663.
- Yung Chang (1940). "越曆朔閏考 (Sur la concordance des dates néoméniques du calendrier annamite et du calendrier chinois de 1759 à 1886)". 西南研究 (Meridio-Occidentale Sinense) (1). The South-West China Society: 25–35.
- Yung Chang (1941). "敦煌殘曆疑年舉例 (Some Fragments of Calendars Discovered at T'un-Huang)". 華西協合大学中國文化研究所集刊 (Studia Serica). 1 (4). The Chinese Cultural Studies Research Institute, West China Union University: 379–384.

Reprint: Yung Chang (1949). "敦煌殘曆疑年舉例". 華西協合大学中國文化研究所集刊 (Studia Serica). 1 (2 ed.). The Chinese Cultural Studies Research Institute, West China Union University: 29–33.

The following paper of Chang's student Fang Shushu (方淑姝) was jointly authored with Chang:

- Fang, Shushu (1939). "朱世傑垜積術廣義". 數學雜誌 (The Mathematical Gazette). 2 (1). The Chinese Mathematical Society: 94–101.
