= 2013 supranational electoral calendar =

This supranational electoral calendar for the year 2013 lists the supranational elections held in 2013.

== February ==
- 17 February: Ecuador, 5 representatives for the Andean Parliament

== October ==
- Security Council

== November ==
- 12 November: Human Rights Council
- 24 November: Honduras, 20 representatives to the Central American Parliament
