= General debate of the sixty-eighth session of the United Nations General Assembly =

United Nations General Debate Assembly

General Debate of the sixty-eighth session of the United Nations General Assembly
- 24 September – 4 October 2013 68th session 68th general debate

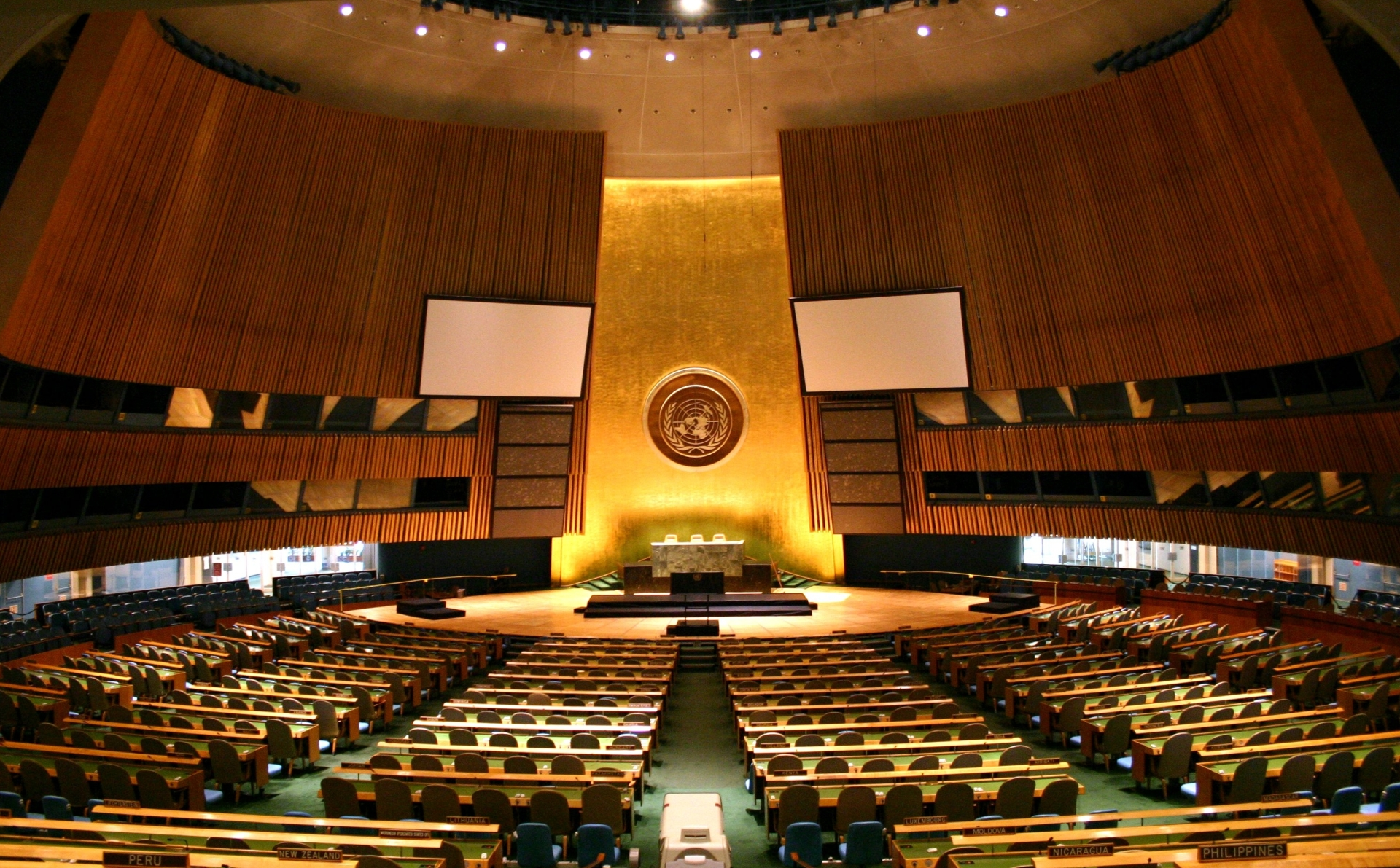
- General Assembly Hall at United Nations Headquarters, New York City
- Host country: United Nations
- Cities: New York City, United States
- Venues: General Assembly Hall at the United Nations Headquarters
- Participants: United Nations Member States
- President: John William Ashe
- Secretary-General: Ban Ki-moon
- Website: gadebate.un.org/en/sessions-archive/68

The General Debate of the sixty-eighth session of the United Nations General Assembly commenced on 24 September 2013 and ended on 4 October 2013. Leaders from a number of member states addressed the UNGA.

There was controversy in this session, Libya broke with protocol.

== Organisation and subjects ==
The order of speakers is given first to member states, then observer states and supranational bodies. Any other observers entities will have a chance to speak at the end of the debate, if they so choose. Speakers will be put on the list in the order of their request, with special consideration for ministers and other government officials of similar or higher rank. According to the rules in place for the General Debate, the statements should be in of the United Nations official languages of Arabic, Chinese, English, French, Russian or Spanish, and will be translated by the United Nations translators. Each speaker is requested to provide 20 advance copies of their statements to the conference officers to facilitate translation and to be presented at the podium. Though there is no time limit for speeches, a voluntary guideline of 15 minutes is requested.

In addition to commenting on issues of individual national and wider international relevance, the President of the General Assembly John William Ashe chose the theme: "The Post-2015 Development Agenda: Setting the Stage!." This means he calls on member states and other stakeholders "to promote dialogue, reflection and commitment to the formulation of an effective new agenda to overcome poverty and insecurity and ensure sustainable development."

The topics of the General Debate included the Syrian civil war and Iran and nuclear weapons. Other issues included the annual debate on United Nations reform, climate change (particularly amongst the Small Island Developing States), Ashe's chosen subject and the Arms Trade Treaty.

== Speaking schedule ==
Saudi Arabia canceled its speech citing "international double standards" on the Middle East as the reason.

The rest of the speaking schedule in the General Assembly Chamber is as follows:

=== 24 September ===
Morning schedule

- United Nations – Secretary-General Ban Ki-moon
- United Nations – 68th Session of the United Nations General Assembly – President John William Ashe
- Brazil – President Dilma Rousseff
- United States – President Barack Obama (Note: The Iranian media praised Obama's speech for attesting to "past mistakes" and he welcomed the "different tone." It also said that Israeli Prime Minister Binyamin Netanyahu would become "isolated" and was viewed as a "warmonger.")
- Turkey – President Abdullah Gül
- Nigeria – President Goodluck Jonathan
- Chile – President Sebastián Piñera Echeñique
- Bulgaria – President Rossen Plevneliev
- Mozambique – President Armando Emílio Guebuza
- France – President François Hollande
- Jordan – King Abdullah II
- Slovakia – President Ivan Gašparovič
- Colombia – President Juan Manuel Santos Calderón
- Qatar – Emir Tamim bin Hamad Al Thani
- Monaco – Prince Albert II
- South Africa – President Jacob Zuma
- Ukraine – President Viktor Yanukovych
- Sri Lanka – President Mahinda Rajapaksa

Afternoon schedule

- Costa Rica – President Laura Chinchilla Miranda
- Austria – President Heinz Fischer
- Paraguay – President Horacio Manuel Cartes Jara
- Latvia – President Andris Bērziņš
- Liberia – President Ellen Johnson-Sirleaf
- Iran – President Hassan Rouhani (Note: Upon returning to Iran following the General Debate, Rouhani received a mixed reception for his conciliatory tone with the U.S. and an historic telephone conversation with the U.S. president, despite the lack of an historic handshake between the two players. Many Iranians cheered on him while others protested and threw eggs and shoes at his official car leaving the airport Supreme Leader Ali Khamenei backed Rouhani's initiative towards the U.S., however he cautioned against trusting the U.S.)
- Gabon – President Ali Bongo Ondimba
- Bosnia and Herzegovina – President Željko Komšić
- Lebanon – President Michel Sleiman
- Switzerland – President Ueli Maurer
- Uruguay – President José Mujica
- Uganda –President Yoweri Kaguta Museveni
- Argentina – President Cristina Fernández
- Malawi – President Joyce Hilda Mtila Banda
- Zambia – President Michael Chilufya Sata
- Sweden – Prime Minister Fredrik Reinfeldt

=== 25 September ===
Morning schedule

- Estonia – President Toomas Hendrik Ilves
- Panama – President Ricardo Martinelli
- Côte d’Ivoire – President Alassane Ouattara
- Peru – President Ollanta Humala Tasso
- Timor-Leste – President Taur Matan Ruak
- Senegal – President Macky Sall
- Democratic Republic of Congo – President Joseph Kabila Kabange
- Senegal – President Macky Sall (Scheduled)
- Madagascar – President Andry Nirina Rajoelina
- Rwanda – President Paul Kagame (Scheduled)
- Burkina Faso – President Blaise Compaoré
- Ethiopia – Prime Minister Hailemariam Desalegn
- Antigua and Barbuda – Prime Minister Winston Baldwin Spencer
- Fiji – Prime Minister Commodore Josaia V. Bainimarama
- European Union – President Herman Van Rompuy
- Kuwait – Prime Minister Sheikh Jaber Al-Mubarak Al-Hamad Al-Sabah (Note: Deputy Prime Minister and Foreign Minister Shiekh Sabah Al Khaled Al Hamad Al Sabah said later of the speech that "other major events also included the participation of 131 heads of state and government, as well as the accelerating pace of regional and international affairs" and that the speech was meant to be inclusive so as to contribute to the implementation of the UN plans to fight poverty and improve sustainable development beyond 2015. He further noted: "The speech also addressed the Syrian situation and we hope the UN Security Council would have a serious stand and stop the bloodshed among the Syrian people and collapse of the state. We also urge the international community to ease humanitarian suffering of the Syrians.")
- Italy – Prime Minister Enrico Letta (Note: Letta flew back from New York City to Italy in order to prevent his government from collapsing after Silvio Berlusconi's The People of Freedom MPs quit the government. Letta said he would quit unless his government won a confidence vote due the following week in parliament; Letta also accused Berlusconi of telling a "huge lie." Berlusconi described the ultimatum as "unacceptable.")

Afternoon schedule

- Serbia – President Tomislav Nikolić
- Chad – President Idriss Deby Itno
- Rwanda – President Paul Kagame
- Kiribati – President Anote Tong
- Poland – President Bronislaw Komorowski
- Swaziland – King Mswati III
- Georgia – President Mikheil Saakashvili
- El Salvador – President Carlos Mauricio Funes Cartagena (Scheduled)
- Micronesia – President Emanuel Mori
- El Salvador – President Carlos Mauricio Funes Cartagena
- Palau – President Tommy Remengesau Jr.
- Comoros – President Ikililou Dhoinine
- Bolivia – President Evo Morales Ayma0
- Spain – Prime Minister Mariano Rajoy Brey (Scheduled)
- Libya – President Ali Zeidan
- Trinidad and Tobago – Prime Minister Kamla Persad-Bissessar
- Spain – Prime Minister Mariano Rajoy Brey
- Tajikistan – Prime Minister Oqil Oqilov
- Cameroon – Foreign Minister Pierre Moukoko Mbonjo
- Norway – Foreign Minister Espen Barth Eide
- Benin – Foreign Minister Nassirou Bako Arifari (Scheduled)

=== 26 September ===
Morning schedule

- Guyana – President Donald Rabindranauth Ramotar
- Namibia – President Hifikepunye Pohamba
- Cyprus – President Nicos Anastasiades (Note: First speech to the UNGA General Debate.)
- Ghana – President John Dramani Mahama
- Mongolia – President Elbegdorj Tsakhia
- Slovenia – President Borut Pahor
- Tunisia – President Mohamed Moncef Marzouki (Note: The Egyptian Ministry of Foreign Affairs rejected and condemned Marzouki's statement. The same night, it released a statement that alleged Marzouki had called on Egyptian authorities to release "what he described as political prisoners" and added that all of Marzouki's statements in regard to Egypt at the General Debate are not true as it challenges the alleged will of the Egyptian people in protests that led up to the 2013 Egyptian coup d'état. "We hope the same destiny for our brothers in Tunisia. Some people remain intent on forcing a certain model which fails to reflect the true nature of the pious Tunisian society.")
- Lithuania – President Dalia Grybauskaitė
- Nauru – President Baron Divavesi Waqa
- Zimbabwe – President Robert Mugabe
- Guatemala – President Otto Fernando Pérez Molina
- Palestine – President Mahmoud Abbas (Note: First speech as the representative of the State of Palestine, following United Nations General Assembly resolution 67/19. Palestine-United States relations occurred on the sidelines of the summit when both president met and Obama told Abbas that a peace deal would be difficult.)
- Malta – Prime Minister Joseph Muscat
- Japan – Prime Minister Shinzo Abe

Afternoon schedule

- Croatia – President Ivo Josipović
- Sudan – President Omar al-Bashir (Scheduled) (Note: Due to controversy, al-Bashir withdrew at the last minute and did not turn up for the General Debate.)
- Marshall Islands – President Christopher Loeak
- Equatorial Guinea – President Teodoro Obiang Nguema Mbasogo
- Somalia – President Hassan Sheikh Mohamud
- Central African Republic – President Michel Djotodia
- Guinea-Bissau – Interim President Manuel Serifo Nhamadjo
- South Sudan – Vice President James Wani Igga
- New Zealand – Prime Minister John Key (Scheduled)
- Moldova – Prime Minister Iurie Leancă
- Lesotho – Prime Minister Thomas Motsoahae Thabane
- Belgium – Prime Minister Elio Di Rupo
- Haiti – Prime Minister Laurent Salvador Lamothe
- New Zealand – Prime Minister John Key
- Cuba – Foreign Minister Bruno Rodriguez Parrilla
- Algeria – Foreign Minister Ramtane Lamamra
- Sierra Leone – Foreign Minister Samura Kamara
- Burundi – Foreign Minister Laurent Kavakure
- Mexico – Foreign Minister José Antonio Meade Kuribreña
- Benin – Foreign Minister Nassirou Bako Arifari

=== 27 September ===
Morning schedule

- Gambia – President Yahya Jammeh
- Tonga – King Tupou VI
- Mali – President Ibrahim Boubacar Keïta
- Iraq – Vice President Khudheir Mussa Al-khuzaie
- Angola – Vice President Manuel Domingos Vicente
- Honduras – Vice President María Antonieta de Bográn
- Seychelles – Vice President Danny Faure
- Pakistan – Prime Minister Muhammad Nawaz Sharif (Note: India-Pakistan relations would occur on a sideline meeting between the two states during the General Debate. In the first meeting since the 2013 Pakistani general election, the leaders of both countries, Nawaz Sharif and Manmohan Singh, pledged to find ways to restore calm across the Kashmir border.)
- Saint Kitts and Nevis – Prime Minister Denzil Douglas
- United Kingdom – Deputy Prime Minister Nick Clegg
- Russia – Foreign Minister Sergey Lavrov
- South Korea – Foreign Minister Yun Byung-se
- China – Foreign Minister Wang Yi
- Australia – Foreign Minister Julie Bishop (Scheduled)
- Uzbekistan – Foreign Minister Abdulaziz Kamilov
- Australia – Foreign Minister Julie Bishop
- Netherlands – Foreign Minister Franciscus Cornelis Gerardus Maria Timmerans
- Congo – Foreign Minister Basile Ikouebe

Afternoon schedule

- Tanzania – President Jakaya Mrisho Kikwete
- Saint Vincent and the Grenadines – Prime Minister Ralph Gonsalves
- Samoa – Prime Minister Tuilaepa Sailele Malielegaoi
- Bangladesh – Prime Minister Sheikh Hasina
- Macedonia – Prime Minister Nikola Gruevski
- San Marino – Foreign Minister Pasquale Valentini
- Montenegro – Prime Minister Milo Đukanović
- Viet Nam – Prime Minister Nguyen Tan Dung
- Czech Republic – Prime Minister Jiří Rusnok
- Luxembourg – Deputy Prime Minister Jean Asselborn
- Greece – Foreign Minister Evangelos Venzelos
- Niger – Deputy Prime Minister Mohamed Bazoum
- Sudan – Foreign Minister Ali Ahmed Karti
- Kazakhstan – Foreign Minister Erlan A. Idrissov
- Indonesia – Foreign Minister Marty Natalegawa
- Afghanistan – Foreign Minister Zalmai Rassoul
- Finland – Foreign Minister Erkki Tuomioja
- Venezuela – Foreign Minister Elías J. Jaua Milano (Note: Venezuelan President Nicolas Maduro did not attend the session citing a death threat. He said that he learned of the plan while at Vancouver airport on his way back from China and that he found it hard to believe that U.S. President Barack Obama was unaware of it.)

==== Right of reply ====
Member states have the option to reply to comments on the day (or even to the days prior), but are limited to 10 minutes for the first response and five minutes for the second response. All speeches are made from the floor, as opposed to the podium for the General Debate.

North Korea responded by saying South Korea had misleading remarks in regard to nuclear weapons while it was under the nuclear umbrella of the U.S. and thus allowed nuclear weapons into the Korean Peninsula and also thus undermined peace in the peninsula. It even denied international law to get verification by IAEA. South Korea then launched a satellite just after that of North Korea and, as such, the U.S. lied it was not an issue at the UNSC. This was a double standard. UNSC history suggests a satellite as a threat to peace and security and by mandate the UNSC does not note a peaceful satellite launch, the UNSC was silent. Parallel to North Korea policy, provocation cannot be a bargaining chip. Amongst points made was that of family reunification, yet during dialogue South Korea opened joint military exercises against the climate of dialogue and arrested political figures favouring unification.

South Korea then replied in saying that North Korea denies it is not bound by obligations as others. According to Article 25 of the United Nations Charter "all members carry out UNSC decisions" and, as such, it was regrettable that North Korea repeats irrational force.

=== 28 September ===
Morning schedule

- Jamaica – Prime Minister Portia Simpson Miller
- Mauritius – Prime Minister Navinchandra Ramgoolam
- Vanuatu – Prime Minister Moana Carcasses Kalosil (Note: Vanuatu controversially called for further rights for the people of West Papua. Kalosil called for the investigation of alleged human rights abuses. He accused the UN of consistently ignoring the West Papuan people. At the same time, Australian Prime Minister Tony Abbott visited Indonesia amid calls for him to address the same.)
- Albania – Prime Minister Edi Rama
- Andorra – Prime Minister Antoni Martí Petit
- Malaysia – Prime Minister Dato’ Sri Mohd Najib Bin Tun Haji Abdul Razak
- Nepal – Chairman of the Council of Ministers Khil Raj Regmi
- India – Prime Minister Dr. Manmohan Singh (Note: India-Pakistan relations would occur on a sideline meeting between the two states during the General Debate. In the first meeting since the 2013 Pakistani general election, the leaders of both countries, Nawaz Sharif and Manmohan Singh, pledged to find ways to restore calm across the Kashmir border.)
- Cape Verde – Prime Minister José Maria Pereira Neves
- Papua New Guinea – Deputy Prime Minister Leo Dion
- Germany – Foreign Minister Guido Westerwelle
- Romania – Foreign Minister Titus Corlățean
- Belarus – Foreign Minister Vladimir Makei
- Portugal – Minister of State Rui Machete
- Egypt – Foreign Minister Nabil Fahmy
- Kyrgyzstan – Foreign Minister Erlan Abdyldayev
- Azerbaijan – Foreign Minister Elmar Maharram oglu Mammadyarov

Afternoon schedule

- Bahamas – Prime Minister Perry Gladstone Christie
- Brunei – Crown Prince Haji Al-muhtadee Billah
- Laos – Vice Prime Minister Thongloun Sisoulith
- Ireland – Tánaiste Eamon Gilmore
- Thailand – Deputy Prime Minister Surapong Tovichakchaikul
- Solomon Islands – Deputy Prime Minister Manasseh Maelanga
- Tuvalu – Deputy Prime Minister Vete Sakaio
- Armenia – Foreign Minister Edward Nalbandyan
- Mauritania – Foreign Minister Ahmed Teguedi
- Liechtenstein – Foreign Minister Aurelia Frick
- Yemen – Foreign Minister Abubaker al-Qirbi
- Singapore – Foreign Minister K. Shanmugam

=== 30 September ===
Morning schedule

- Canada – Foreign Minister John Baird
- Bahrain – Foreign Minister Shaikh Khalid Bin Ahmed Al-Khalifa
- Saudi Arabia – Foreign Minister Prince Saud Al-Faisal (Scheduled)
- Syria – Deputy Prime Minister Walid Almoualem
- Turkmenistan – Deputy Prime Minister Sapardurdu Toyliyev (Scheduled)
- Turkmenistan – Foreign Minister Rashid Meredov
- Oman – Foreign Minister Yousef Bin Al-Alawi Bin Abdullah
- Iceland – Foreign Minister Gunnar Bragi Sveinsson
- Djibouti – (Scheduled)
- Belize – Foreign Minister Wilfred Elrington
- Morocco – Foreign Minister Saad-Eddine El Othmani
- Eritrea – Foreign Minister Osman Saleh Mohammed
- Nicaragua – Foreign Minister Samuel Santos López
- Saint Lucia – Foreign Minister Alva Romanus Baptiste

Afternoon schedule

- Hungary – Foreign Minister János Martonyi
- Guinea – Foreign Minister François Lounceny Fall
- Philippines – Foreign Minister Albert F. del Rosario
- Barbados – Foreign Minister Maxine Pamela Ometa McClean
- Myanmar – Foreign Minister Wunna Maung Lwin
- Bhutan – Foreign Minister Lyonpo Rinzin Dorje
- Suriname – Foreign Minister Winston G. Lackin
- Grenada – Foreign Minister Nickolas Steele

==== Right of reply ====
Indonesia replied in strongly rejecting the issue of West Papua made by Vanuatu. They said that the statement reflects an unfortunate lack of understanding on the historic role of the UN and the "principled position of the international community at large" and developments in West Papua, Indonesia. (emphasis added) It was also an "utter refusal to acknowledge" facts of the province and the efforts of the government of Indonesia and local authorities in generating the welfare of the people of the two provinces. Indonesia's representatives at the UN also said that internal political dynamics of Vanuatu have played a role in raising West Papua issues at the UN and was acknowledged by a statement of the prime minister of Vanuatu and published by the Vanuatu Post that read: "West Papua politicised and used various political movements not for the people in West Papua but for political campaigns and propaganda." They reiterated that the statement was not by Indonesian authorities but the then government of Vanuatu. Additionally, Indonesia was not distracted by said inclination and will continue development efforts through special autonomy and will also continue friendly relations with Vanuatu.

Pakistan responded to the statement by the Bangladeshi prime minister in saying that it was deeply dismayed as Pakistan and Bangladesh are brotherly countries and were once citizens of the same country and also continue to have warmth today. They added that the statement by Hasina was misrepresentation of the facts, the premise was wrong and the legal dimension was untenable. unhelpful and counter productive to Bangladesh-Pakistan relations. Yet the people of Pakistan would work to strengthen ties with Bangladesh.

=== 1 October ===
Morning schedule

- Maldives – Acting Foreign Minister Mariyam Shakeela
- Botswana – Foreign Minister Phandu T. C. Skelemani
- Holy See – Secretary for Relations with States Archbishop Dominique Mamberti
- North Korea – Vice Minister for Foreign Affairs Pak Kil Yon
- Dominican Republic – Deputy Minister for Foreign Affairs Jose Manuel Trullols
- Cambodia – Permanent Representative to the UN Kosal Sea
- Dominica – Permanent Representative to the UN Vince Henderson
- Togo – Permanent Representative to the UN Kodjo Menan
- Ecuador – Permanent Representative to the UN Xavier Lasso Mendoza
- Sao Tome and Principe – Permanent Representative to the UN Carlos Filomeno Agostinho Das Neves
- Denmark – Permanent Representative to the UN Ib Petersen
- Israel – Prime Minister Benjamin Netanyahu (Note: In response to the speech that attack him, Iranian President Hassan Rouhani said that Israel was concerned amidst possibilities of a new relationship between Iran and the West. He added: "We don't expect anything else from the Zionist regime. [Israel is] upset and angry because it sees that its blunted sword is being replaced with logic as the governing force in the world, and because the Iranian nation's message of peace is being heard better.")

==== Right of reply ====
Libya replied to Bolivian President Evo Morales, who had asked in his speech who controlled Libya's oil. The Libyan delegate said the oil had belonged to Muammar Gaddafi and his family, accused Morales of belonging to an organization that Gaddafi funded, and said that the international community had helped Libya by striking forces that were attacking civilians. General Assembly President John William Ashe reminded delegates that a reply to a head of state had to be made in writing. Bolivia called the Libyan remarks absurd and insulting, said they broke procedure, and reserved the right to take legal action. Libya answered that it had never lied and that anyone could see its documents, and Bolivia then rejected the claims again.

Iran's Khodadad Seifi responded to Israeli Prime Minister Benjamin Netanyahu, who had urged the world not to trust Iranian President Hassan Rouhani. Seifi said Iran had a right to peaceful nuclear energy, was meeting its obligations under the NPT and was cooperating with the IAEA. He said that Israel, which is not a party to the NPT, should join it and open its facilities to inspection, and that sanctions on Iran should be lifted. Iran spoke again on a point of order to say that its foreign minister had been misquoted: the line was that a "smile attack is better than a lie attack".

Azerbaijan and Armenia traded replies over Nagorno-Karabakh. Azerbaijan accused Armenia of occupying the territory in defiance of United Nations Security Council resolutions and of denying refugees the right to return. Armenia said that Nagorno-Karabakh's 1988 call for self-determination had been peaceful, accused Azerbaijan of spreading lies, and pointed to the case of Ramil Safarov and to statements by Ilham Aliyev. Each country spoke a second time and repeated its position.

North Korea said it faced a unique security threat from the United States. It cited American nuclear weapons in South Korea since 1957, the yearly joint military drills and its inclusion in the "axis of evil", and said it had no choice but to keep a nuclear deterrent. It also criticized Israel over its own nuclear weapons. South Korea replied that the drills with the United States were defensive and that North Korea was required by Security Council resolutions, including Resolution 2094, to give up its weapons. North Korea answered that the drills were offensive, citing the use of B-52 bombers, and that it did not recognize the resolutions. South Korea spoke again to say that North Korea blamed others for its own provocations and that the resolutions had been adopted unanimously.

==== Closing remarks ====
President John William Ashe closed the General Debate for the year in summation of the comments. He said the comments made would guide the session and recalled his theme of the General Debate and outlining priority areas for deliberations by member states in the form of high level events or thematic debates. He added that virtually all delegations that commented on the theme, commended and pledged full support for it. He regards this as a premise on what is to come over the next year and “trust[s] we all work creatively and capably in the session.” He also sought to build on the Rio +20 and begin work on finding a universal development agenda that includes food security, health care (particularly maternal care) and the fight against H.I.V./A.I.D.S. He also reminded the audience that some delegations had said that democracy, human rights and peace and security must be a part of the sustainable development agenda; and that some also spoke of empower of women, youth, indigenous and disabled. He also talked of the emphasis on the role of partnerships (which will be focus of one thematic debate) and reminded the delegates gathered that while South-South cooperation is important in development, it complements north-south cooperation not replacement. He also called on the participation of non-state actors and a need for funding innovation and technology transfer. He further reminded the delegations of the specific needs and vulnerabilities of SIDS are an important consideration in the Post-2015 Development Agenda.

Statements at the General Debate, he noted, included many condemnations of the use of chemical weapons in Syria coupled with calls for the perpetrators to be held accountable and welcomes Syria's adherence to the OPCW. Many states also welcomed the unanimous adoption of United Nations Security Council Resolution 2118 on Syria and for UNSC to uphold its charter on action, the desire for a negotiated solution in the Geneva II Conference on Syria. On the issue of Palestine, there were repeated call for a two state solution and, on those lines, there was a welcoming of the resumption of direct negotiations. He also heard praise for progress in Mali and the Democratic Republic of Congo, though there was concern for Guinea-Bissau, Central African Republic, Sudan and the Sahel. On Somalia, he heard words of encouragement and caution. There were also calls for the international community to take action against terrorism in all its forms and a strong condemnation of terrorist incidents in Kenya, Pakistan, and Iraq; though he said that “sadly…add Nigeria.” He also called for a role for women and to eliminate sexual violence in conflict and the role of child soldiers. He further commented on the transition after the Arab Spring and on cyber security requiring a bigger UN role. He also noted there was some reservations on the International Criminal Court with bias to particular geographic regions, concerns about the use of WMDs and risks of proliferation, calls for the creation of nuclear-weapon-free zones and that the use of small arms revived a negative impact on peace and security and that, as such, the ATT was welcomed with calls for its prompt entry into force. Other called included the need to reform the primary organs of the UN with more balance to be fair and accountable, in particular the UNSC and how the use of the veto has had a paralysing effect; in this regard the UNGA should have a bigger role and have better coordination. This then required member states to move with purposeful direction on required reforms and revitalisation.

The General Debate, he concluded, provides “useful measure of stock taking within the mandate of the organisation and was the only place for the 193 member states to have their voices heard [amongst] what effects our peoples’ concerns. The organisation is often accused of being a talk shop, perhaps so, but the General Debate serves a purpose to mark where we as a global community and mark guidelines for direction. [It is a] useful point for peer review and general accountability. despite negative, faith in the value of the organisation as world forum is high. With guidance this week, we must find common ground to move forward on actions. In the real world where we live, such compromise is good for a post-2015 framework. I look forward to working with you. In conclude by thanking the secretary general and the department of conference management.”

== See also ==
- List of UN General Assembly sessions
- List of General debates of the United Nations General Assembly
