= List of presidential trips made by Barack Obama (2013) =

This is a list of presidential trips made by Barack Obama during 2013, the fifth year of his presidency as the 44th president of the United States.

This list excludes trips made within Washington, D.C., the US federal capital in which the White House, the official residence and principal workplace of the president, is located. Additionally excluded are trips to Camp David, the country residence of the president, and to the private home of the Obama family in Kenwood, Chicago.

== January ==
Country/ U.S. state	Areas visited	Dates	Details	Image
Virginia	Arlington	January 20	President Obama participated in a wreath-laying ceremony at the Tomb of the Unknown Soldier in Arlington National Cemetery following his second inauguration. He was joined by Vice President Biden.	
Nevada	Las Vegas	January 29	President Obama delivered remarks at Del Sol High School regarding the need for an immigration reform.	

== February ==
Country/ U.S. state	Areas visited	Dates	Details	Image
Minnesota	Minneapolis	February 4	President Obama met with the Minneapolis Police Department to discuss his plans to control gun violence.	
Maryland	Annapolis	February 6	President Obama met with the Senate Democratic Caucus to discuss the United States debt-ceiling crisis of 2013 during the Senate Democratic Issues Conference.	
Virginia	Leesburg	February 7	President Obama met with the House Democratic Caucus at the House Democratic Issues Conference.	
North Carolina	Asheville	February 13	President Obama toured the Linamar North Carolina factory, where he also delivered remarks on manufacturing.	
Georgia	Decatur	February 14	President Obama visited the College Heights Early Childhood Learning Center and delivered remarks at the Decatur Recreation Center to promote high-quality preschool education, in the wake of his 2013 State of the Union Address.	
Illinois	Chicago	February 15	President Obama delivered remarks on gun violence (in the wake of the death of Hadiya Pendleton) and the middle class economy at Hyde Park Academy High School.	
Virginia	Newport News	February 26	President Obama delivered remarks at the Newport News Shipbuilding regarding the negative effects of the budget sequestration in 2013 on jobs.	

== March ==
Country/ U.S. state	Areas visited	Dates	Details	Image
Maryland	Bethesda	March 5	President Obama met with wounded troops and their families at the Walter Reed National Military Medical Center.	
Illinois	Chicago, Lemont	March 15	President Obama toured the Argonne National Laboratory, before delivering remarks on energy.	
Israel	Tel Aviv, Jerusalem,	March 20–22	On March 20, President Obama arrived at Ben Gurion Airport in Tel Aviv, where he was greeted by President Shimon Peres and Prime Minister Benjamin Netanyahu. He then viewed an Iron Dome battery at Ben Gurion Airport, before meeting separately with President Peres and Prime Minister Netanyahu in Jerusalem to discuss regional issues, particularly Iran's nuclear program, the Israeli–Palestinian peace process, and the Syrian Civil War, as well as the United States' commitment to Israel's security. In the evening, Prime Minister Netanyahu hosted a working dinner for President Obama. On March 21, President Obama and Prime Minister Netanyahu toured the Israel Museum, where he viewed the Dead Sea Scrolls and a technology exhibition. The President then traveled to Ramallah, where he met with President Mahmoud Abbas to further discuss the Israeli–Palestinian peace process, followed by a joint press conference and a working lunch. He then met with Prime Minister Salam Fayyad, visited the Al-Bireh Youth Resource Development Center, and delivered a speech to Israeli students at the International Convention Center, back in Jerusalem. In the evening, President Peres hosted a state dinner for President Obama, where Obama was honored the President's Medal. On March 22, President Obama attended a wreath-laying ceremony at the graves of Theodor Herzl and former Prime Minister Yitzhak Rabin at Mount Herzl and paid his respects at Yad Vashem. Before departing Israel, the President visited the Church of the Nativity in Bethlehem.	
State of Palestine	Ramallah, Bethlehem	March 20–22		
Jordan	Amman, Petra	March 22–23	President Obama met with King Abdullah II to discuss the Syrian Civil War and its refugee crisis, as well as the Israeli–Palestinian peace process and the Jordanian protests part of the Arab Spring, followed by a joint press conference and a dinner. The following day, the President visited Petra, before departing Jordan.	
Florida	Miami	March 29	President Obama toured the tunnel project at PortMiami, where he also delivered remarks on infrastructure and the redevelopment of the middle class economy.	

== April ==
Country/ U.S. state	Areas visited	Dates	Details	Image
Colorado	Denver	April 3	President Obama addressed law enforcement officials of the Denver Police Department and community leaders at the Denver Police Academy to support his plans for reducing gun violence.	
California	San Francisco, Atherton	April 3–4	President Obama attended four fundraising events for the Democratic Congressional Campaign Committee and the Democratic National Committee.	
Connecticut	Hartford	April 8	President Obama delivered remarks at the University of Hartford to urge Congress in passing his plans for reducing gun violence.	
Massachusetts	Boston	April 18	President Obama and First Lady Michelle Obama attended the interfaith service at the Cathedral of the Holy Cross for the victims of the Boston Marathon bombings, where the President delivered remarks.	
Texas	Dallas, Waco	April 24–25	Upon arrival in Dallas, President Obama and First Lady Michelle Obama headed to a fundraising dinner for the Democratic National Committee. The following day, the President and the First Lady attended the dedication ceremony of the George W. Bush Presidential Center and a memorial service at the Baylor University's Ferrell Center in Waco to honor the victims of the West Fertilizer Company explosion.	

== May ==
Country/ U.S. state	Areas visited	Dates	Details	Image
Mexico	Mexico City	May 2–3	President Obama met with President Enrique Peña Nieto at the National Palace, where a bilateral meeting and a joint press conference were held. Among the topics discussed were trade, immigration, the war on drugs, and the security partnership between the two countries. The following day, the President delivered a speech at the National Museum of Anthropology on the possibility of an immigration reform.	
Costa Rica	San José	May 3–4	President Obama held bilateral talks with President Laura Chinchilla at Casa Amarilla, which focused on Costa Rica's economic expansion, foreign policies, institutional development, public security, and regional trade, followed by a joint press conference at the National Center for Art and Culture and a working dinner with Central American Integration System leaders at the National Theatre of Costa Rica. The following day, the President attended the Central America Forum on Sustainable Economic Development, where he met with business leaders and delivered remarks on security issues and economic growth.	
Texas	Austin	May 9	President Obama met with students from the University of Texas at Austin and visited the Manor New Tech High School, before delivering remarks on innovation and manufacturing at the Applied Materials facility.	
New York	New York City	May 13	President Obama attended two fundraising events for the Democratic National Committee, before attending a joint fundraiser at the Waldorf Astoria New York for the Democratic Congressional Campaign Committee and the Democratic Senatorial Campaign Committee.	
Maryland	Baltimore	May 17	President Obama visited the Moravia Park Elementary School and delivered remarks at the Ellicott Dredges factory on the effect of infrastructure to the middle class economy.	
Maryland	Annapolis	May 24	President Obama delivered a commencement speech at the United States Naval Academy.	
Virginia	Arlington	May 27	President Obama participated in Memorial Day ceremonies at Arlington National Cemetery.	
New Jersey	Asbury Park	May 28	President Obama toured the Hurricane Sandy recovery efforts in Asbury Park with Governor Chris Christie, before delivering remarks at the Asbury Park Convention Hall.	
Illinois	Chicago	May 29–30	President Obama attended two fundraising events for the Democratic Congressional Campaign Committee.	

== June ==
Country/ U.S. state	Areas visited	Dates	Details	Image
Maryland	Bethesda	June 4	President Obama visited with wounded military troops recovering at Walter Reed National Military Medical Center.	
North Carolina	Mooresville	June 6	President Obama visited Mooresville Middle School, where he also delivered remarks on educational technology.	
California	San Jose, Los Angeles, Palm Springs	June 6–7	In San Jose, President Obama attended two Democratic Senatorial Campaign Committee events and delivered remarks on the Patient Protection and Affordable Care Act at the Fairmont San Jose. He then traveled to Los Angeles for a brief visit to attend a Democratic Party fundraiser in Santa Monica, before heading to Palm Springs to meet with Chinese President Xi Jinping at Sunnylands in Rancho Mirage for discussions on issues surrounding the China–United States relations, including cyberwarfare attacks.	
Massachusetts	Boston	June 12	President Obama attended a campaign rally for Senator Ed Markey, the Democratic candidate for the senatorial election in Massachusetts.	
Florida	Miami	June 12	President Obama attended a private Democratic National Committee fundraiser.	
United Kingdom	Belfast, Lough Erne	June 17–18	After arriving in Belfast with the First Family, President Obama and First Lady Michelle Obama both delivered remarks at the Waterfront Hall, urging schoolchildren to take action for world peace, in light of the Good Friday Agreement, before attending the G8 summit in Lough Erne, which focused on counter-terrorism, the Syrian Civil War, trade, taxation, and the world economy. Additionally, the President met with European Union leaders to discuss the Transatlantic Trade and Investment Partnership, as well as meeting separately with British Prime Minister David Cameron, French President François Hollande, German Chancellor Angela Merkel, Italian Prime Minister Enrico Letta, Libyan Prime Minister Ali Zeidan, and Russian President Vladimir Putin.	
Germany	Berlin	June 18–19	President Obama met with President Joachim Gauck at the Bellevue Palace, before meeting with Chancellor Angela Merkel at Bundeskanzleramt Berlin for a working lunch and a joint press conference. In the afternoon, he delivered a speech at the Brandenburg Gate, highlighting the "peace with justice" theme with nuclear disarmament from former U.S. President John F. Kennedy's 1963 "Ich bin ein Berliner" speech in West Berlin. The President then met with Peer Steinbrück, the Social Democratic Party's candidate for Chancellor in the 2013 German federal election. In the evening, President Obama was hosted a dinner by Chancellor Merkel at Charlottenburg Palace, before departing Berlin.	
Senegal	Dakar	June 26–28	Upon arrival at Léopold Sédar Senghor International Airport on June 26, President Obama and members of the First Family were welcomed by President Macky Sall and First Lady Marieme Faye Sall. The following day, on June 27, President Obama held bilateral talks and a joint press conference with President Sall at the Presidential Palace, before meeting with African judicial leaders at the Supreme Court in Dakar to discuss the importance of the rule of law being placed. The President and the First Family also visited the House of Slaves on Gorée Island and attended a civil society event at the Goree Institute, before attending a state dinner hosted by President Sall. Before departing Dakar on June 28, President Obama toured the Feed the Future Agricultural Technology Marketplace, where he also attended a round table discussion with farmers, non-governmental organization partners, and other private sector entities in West Africa to discuss food security.	
South Africa	Johannesburg, Pretoria, Soweto, Cape Town	June 28 – July 1	On June 28, President Obama and the First Family arrived at Air Force Base Waterkloof in Pretoria for a four-day state visit to South Africa, where they were welcomed into an arrival ceremony by International Relations and Cooperation Minister Maite Nkoana-Mashabane. On June 29, President Obama held a bilateral meeting with President Jacob Zuma at the Union Building in Pretoria, where regional issues were discussed, including the Kivu conflict, the political situation in Zimbabwe, and South Africa's efforts in combating HIV/AIDS, followed by a joint press conference. He participated in a town hall meeting with young Africans at the University of Johannesburg's Soweto campus, met with African Union Chairperson Nkosazana Dlamini-Zuma to discuss the importance of the African Union's efforts for democracy, regional peace, and regional security, and attended an official dinner hosted by President Zuma. The President also met with the family of former President Nelson Mandela, who was critically ill, at the Nelson Mandela Centre of Memory. On June 30, President Obama and the First Family traveled to Cape Town, where they visited Robben Island, the former prison of Mandela. The President then visited the Desmond Tutu HIV Foundation Youth Center, where he met with Archbishop Emeritus Desmond Tutu for a round table discussion, before delivering a speech at the University of Cape Town, urging young Africans to carry out former President Mandela's legacy. On July 1, the President and the First Family departed Cape Town.	

== July ==
Country/ U.S. state	Areas visited	Dates	Details	Image
Tanzania	Dar es Salaam	July 1–2	President Obama met with President Jakaya Kikwete at Ikulu for a bilateral meeting and a joint press conference. The two presidents discussed Tanzania's development to the African economy, as well as regional conflicts, including the Kivu conflict. President Obama also announced the United States' $10 million commitment to end wildlife trade in Africa. After, the President attended a CEO round table forum with African and American business leaders. In the evening, President Kikwete hosted an official dinner for President Obama and First Lady Michelle Obama. The following day, on July 2, President Obama, along with former U.S. President George W. Bush and former First Lady Laura Bush, attended a wreath laying ceremony at a memorial to honor the victims of the 1998 United States embassy bombings. The President then visited the Ubungo II Thermal Power Station in Ubungo to promote the United States government's "Power Africa" initiative, which aims to address power outage issues in several African countries.	
Illinois	Galesburg	July 24	President Obama delivered remarks on the economy at Knox College, as part of a series of speeches regarding the refocus of his economic policy, including a proposal for a bargain for the middle class.	
Missouri	Warrensburg	July 24	President Obama delivered remarks at the University of Central Missouri, continuing his series of speeches regarding the refocus of his economic policy.	
Florida	Jacksonville	July 25	President Obama toured the Jacksonville Port Authority, where he also delivered remarks on the economy, particularly on the importance of middle class security.	
Tennessee	Chattanooga	July 30	President Obama toured the Amazon.com fulfillment center, before delivering remarks to propose a bargain for the middle class.	

== August ==
Country/ U.S. state	Areas visited	Dates	Details	Image
Arizona	Phoenix	August 6	President Obama visited Erickson Construction Co., Inc., before continuing his series of speeches on the refocus of his economic policy at Desert Vista High School, emphasizing on middle class homeownership.	
California	Burbank, Los Angeles, Marine Corps Base Camp Pendleton	August 6–7	After arriving in the Los Angeles County, President Obama filmed his appearance on The Tonight Show with Jay Leno at The Burbank Studios in Burbank. The following day, the President participated in an online discussion event hosted by Zillow CEO Spencer Rascoff and met with United States Marine Corps troops and families at Marine Corps Base Camp Pendleton, where he also delivered a speech.	
New York	Buffalo, Syracuse, Binghamton	August 22–23	President Obama embarked on a two-day bus tour to deliver remarks on a proposal to decrease college tuition rates at the University at Buffalo and at Henninger High School in Syracuse. The following day, the President participated in a town hall meeting at Binghamton University.	
Pennsylvania	Scranton	August 23	President Obama continued his two-day bus tour to deliver remarks on college affordability at Lackawanna College, along with Vice President Joe Biden.	

== September ==
Country/ U.S. state	Areas visited	Dates	Details	Image
Sweden	Stockholm	September 4–5	President Obama's visit to Sweden marked the first bilateral visit of a sitting U.S. president to Sweden, as well as the first visit of a sitting U.S. president to Stockholm. The visit replaced a visit to Moscow, after tensions with the Russia–United States relations from Russia's grant to allow temporary asylum to Edward Snowden, a former CIA system administrator and NSA contractor who had leaked classified information from the NSA since June 2013. After arriving in Stockholm on September 4, President Obama met with Prime Minister Fredrik Reinfeldt for a bilateral meeting and a joint press conference at Rosenbad. The two heads of government discussed Sweden's efforts on renewable energy and climate change, as well as strategies on dealing with the Syrian Civil War. They later visited the Stockholm Synagogue to celebrate the beginning of Rosh Hashanah, where the President paid his respects to Raoul Wallenberg. After, President Obama and Prime Minister Reinfeldt visited the Royal Institute of Technology, where they visited an exhibit presenting innovative research on renewable energy through solar and fuel cell technology. In the evening, President Obama and Prime Minister Reinfeldt attended a dinner with the other Nordic leaders, specifically Danish Prime Minister Helle Thorning-Schmidt, Finnish President Sauli Niinistö, Icelandic Prime Minister Sigmundur Davíð Gunnlaugsson, and Norwegian Prime Minister Jens Stoltenberg at the prime minister's residence, Sager House. The president spent the night at the Grand Hotel. Before departing Stockholm the following day, President Obama met with King Carl XVI Gustaf and Queen Silvia at the Stockholm Palace.	
Russia	Saint Petersburg	September 5–6	President Obama attended the G-20 summit at the Constantine Palace.	
Virginia	Arlington County	September 11	President Obama attended a memorial ceremony at the Pentagon Memorial in Arlington County, Virginia, where he spoke on the twelfth anniversary of the September 11 attacks.	
Missouri	Liberty	September 20	President Obama toured the Ford Kansas City Assembly Plant, where he also delivered remarks on the progress of the economy recovery after the 2008 financial crisis and a proposal a bargain for the middle class. During his remarks, the President also urged Congress to pass a funding bill that would prevent a government shutdown in the fiscal year of 2013.	
New York	New York City	September 23–24	After arriving in New York with First Lady Michelle Obama on September 23, President Obama headed to the Waldorf Astoria New York to meet with Nigerian President Goodluck Jonathan for a bilateral meeting, discussing security in Nigeria with the emergence of Boko Haram, as well as issues on energy and power. After, the President held a civil society round table discussion at the New York Hilton Midtown Manhattan Hotel. He then returned to the Waldorf Astoria New York to meet with members and families of the United States Mission to the United Nations, before attending a dinner reception for visiting heads of state and government. The following day, President Obama addressed the sixty-eighth session of the United Nations General Assembly, where he discussed his foreign policy efforts on the conflicts in the Middle East, particularly the Arab–Israeli conflict, the peace process of the Israeli–Palestinian conflict, the comprehensive agreement on Iran's nuclear program, and the Syrian Civil War. After the address, the President met with the United Nations General Assembly President John William Ashe, before holding a bilateral meeting with Lebanese President Michel Suleiman, where he also announced a donation of $74 million to Lebanon for their assistance in the Syrian refugee crisis. In the afternoon, the President met with United Nations Secretary-General Ban Ki-moon, attended the luncheon hosted by Ban, and met with Palestinian President Mahmoud Abbas to further discuss the Israeli–Palestinian peace process. President Obama also participated in the Clinton Global Initiative Annual Meeting at the Sheraton New York Times Square Hotel, where the importance of a health care reform was discussed with the Clinton family. Before departing New York, the President and the First Lady attended a Democratic National Committee fundraising event at the Waldorf Astoria New York.	

== October ==
Country/ U.S. state	Areas visited	Dates	Details	Image
New York	New York City	October 25	President Obama visited Pathways in Technology Early College High School (P-TECH), where he also delivered remarks to promote the importance of education contributing to the creation of job opportunities for young people, citing P-TECH as an example from his 2013 State of the Union Address. He also attended two fundraising events, one hosted by the Democratic Congressional Campaign Committee and the other hosted by the Democratic National Committee.	
Massachusetts	Boston, Weston	October 30	President Obama delivered remarks at Faneuil Hall to address criticism over the Patient Protection and Affordable Care Act. He also attended a Democratic Party fundraising dinner reception in Weston.	

== November ==
Country/ U.S. state	Areas visited	Dates	Details	Image
Maryland	Bethesda	November 5	President Obama met with wounded military troops at the Walter Reed National Military Medical Center and visited the Fisher House Foundation.	
Texas	Dallas	November 6	President Obama met with volunteers from the Dallas Area Interfaith Coalition supporting the Patient Protection and Affordable Care Act at Temple Emanu-El. He also attended two Democratic Party fundraising events.	
Louisiana	New Orleans	November 8	President Obama toured and delivered remarks at the Port of New Orleans regarding infrastructural investment to strengthen foreign trade.	
Florida	Miami	November 8–9	President Obama attended three fundraising events to benefit the Democratic National Committee and the Democratic Senatorial Campaign Committee.	
Virginia	Arlington County	November 11	President Obama traveled to the Arlington National Cemetery on Veterans Day, laying a wreath on the Tomb of the Unknowns.	
Ohio	Cleveland	November 14	President Obama toured and delivered remarks on the economy at the ArcelorMittal steel mill.	
Pennsylvania	Philadelphia	November 14	President Obama attended a fundraising event to benefit the Democratic Senatorial Campaign Committee.	
Virginia	Arlington County	November 20	President Obama and First Lady Michelle Obama traveled to the Arlington National Cemetery to mark the 50th anniversary of President Kennedy's assassination, laying a wreath at the Kennedy gravesite. They were joined by former President Bill Clinton and former Secretary of State Hillary Clinton.	
Washington	Seattle, Medina	November 24–25	President Obama attended two Democratic Party fundraising events.	
California	San Francisco, Los Angeles, Glendale	November 25–26	In San Francisco, President Obama delivered remarks to address the need for an immigration reform at the Betty Ong Recreation Center in Chinatown, before attending a fundraising lunch at the SFJAZZ Center and a round table discussion at the residence of Salesforce.com CEO Marc Benioff. He then departed for Los Angeles, where he attended two fundraising events for both the Democratic Congressional Campaign Committee and the Democratic Senatorial Campaign Committee at the residence of former basketball player Magic Johnson and at the residence of Israeli-American businessman Haim Saban. The following day, the President attended a Democratic Party fundraising event at the residence of television producer and writer Marta Kauffman in Hancock Park. Before departing Los Angeles, President Obama toured the DreamWorks Animation studio in Glendale with CEO Jeffrey Katzenberg and delivered a speech mainly regarding the importance of the entertainment industry's contributions to the economy.	

== December ==
Country/ U.S. state	Areas visited	Dates	Details	Image
South Africa	Johannesburg, Soweto	December 9–11	President Obama and First Lady Michelle Obama returned to South Africa on their second visit during the year, traveling along with former U.S. President George W. Bush, former First Lady Laura Bush, and former First Lady and Secretary of State Hillary Clinton, aboard the Air Force One, to attend the state memorial service for Nelson Mandela, the first President of South Africa, at FNB Stadium in Johannesburg, where they were later joined by former U.S. Presidents Bill Clinton (and his daughter Chelsea) and Jimmy Carter. During the memorial service, President Obama also delivered a eulogy for Mandela.	

== See also ==
- List of international presidential trips made by Barack Obama
- Lists of presidential trips made by Barack Obama
