= Sheri Yan =

American socialite

Shiwei Yan
- Born: 1956 (age 69–70); Anhui, China
- Other name: Sheri Yan
- Spouse: Roger Uren
- Children: 1

Shiwei 'Sheri' Yan (born 1956) is an American socialite and author. She is known for her involvement in multiple intelligence-related scandals.

== Early life ==
Yan was born in the Anhui province in 1956, living with her parents and brother in a writers' compound. When Yan was 11 years old, her parents were sent to a re-education camp. At the age of 15, Yan joined cultural group run by the Red Guards, a student-led paramilitary social movement mobilized by Chairman Mao Zedong. She reunited with her family five years later.

== Career ==
Yan had studied to become a journalist, later working for the Communist Party's propaganda outlet China National Radio in Beijing. In the 1980s, Yan flew to the US to work as a journalist and to learn English. Her mother had sown $400 into the lining of her jacket.

Yan had been previously hired by Bruce Dover, an executive at the Australian Broadcasting Corporation, as a lobbyist for the purpose of expanding the company's presence in China.

In 2012, Yan created a non-governmental organization, named the Global Sustainability Foundation (GSF). Former Australian chairman of law firm Freehills, Ian Hutchison, was GSF's "Vice Chairman of the Board" and Australia's former New York consul general, Phil Scanlan, was a GSF board adviser. Former United Nations (UN) General Assembly president John William Ashe was a notable backer of the organization. The NGO had previously received UN accreditation.

While on bail, Yan began working with Children of Promise, a Brooklyn-based charity for the children of incarcerated parents. She turned their art lessons into a book called Art from the Heart to showcase the charity's work. After she left prison, Yan became the executive director of the charity.

Yan wrote an autobiography The Halfway House (2019), in Chinese which sold out. Presently, there are discussions about writing an English language translation.

== Investigations ==
Yan and her husband Roger Uren, a former Office of National Assessments (ONA) official, were investigated by ASIO on suspicion of spying for China. Uren, former Assistant Secretary responsible for the Asia section of ONA, was found to have removed documents pertaining to Chinese intelligence operations in Australia, and kept them in his apartment. Yan was suspected of undertaking influence operations on behalf of the Chinese Communist Party, and introducing Colonel Liu Chaoying, a military intelligence officer, to Australian contacts.

In 2013, the Federal Bureau of Investigation (FBI) alleged Yan, an Australian-Chinese suspected by Australian Security Intelligence Organisation (ASIO) of Chinese intelligence activity, bribed the former president of the United Nations General Assembly, John Ashe. She allegedly used A$200,000 of Chau Chak Wing's money to bribe Ashe to attend a conference held at Chau's Imperial Springs resort in China. Yan disclosed that she and others had paid Mr. Ashe to help promote business ventures from "which we intended to profit" beginning in 2012. Yan plead guilty to bribery charges and served a 20-month prison sentence, however denied that she was spying on behalf of the Chinese government. Five other charges were dropped as part of the guilty plea. Greg Rudd, a political lobbyist and brother of former Australian prime minister Kevin Rudd, endorsed Yan's character, which was used to seek a reduced jail sentence.

== Personal life ==
Yan was previously married before leaving China for the United States. She later married Roger Uren, an Australian diplomat who at the time was writing a book about Kang Sheng. In 1996, they had a daughter.
