= Chau Chak Wing =

Chinese-Australian property developer (born 1949)

- Born: 1949 (age 76–77); Guangdong, China
- Other names: Chinese: 周泽荣; Chinese: 周澤榮; pinyin: Zhōu Zéróng; Sidney Lau: Jau^{1} Jaak^{6}-wing^{4}
- Occupation: Real estate businessman
- Title: Chairman, Kingold Group

Chau Chak-wing (simplified Chinese: 周泽荣; traditional Chinese: 周澤榮; pinyin: Zhōu Zéróng; Sidney Lau: Jau^{1} Jaak^{6}-wing^{4}; born 1949), is a Chinese-Australian property developer known for his Kingold Group business based in Guangzhou, People's Republic of China (PRC). Journalists and think tanks have reported on Chau's links to Chinese Communist Party (CCP) entities and interests throughout his career.

== Early life and career ==
Chau was born in Guangdong Province, PRC. He has been described as being either of Chaozhou or Shantou heritage. Chau emigrated from Chaozhou to Hong Kong in the 1970s. After further emigrating to Australia in the 1980s, he returned to live in Guangdong in 1988.

In the early 1990s, Chau founded the Kingold Group (sometimes referred to as the Qiao Xin Group). The group's main interests are property, finance, education, hospitality, healthcare and media.

In 2004, Chau received an honorary doctorate from Keuka College in the United States.

In September 2005, Chau founded the Australia China Friendship and Exchange Association (ACFEA).

Since August 2011, Chau has served as the chairman for the Guangdong Huaxing Bank, previously serving as a director.

=== New Express Daily ===
In 2001, Chau joint-ventured with the Guangzhou, PRC, provincial government's Yangcheng Evening News to commence publishing the New Express Daily there.

In 2004, Chau established the pro-Beijing The Australian New Express Daily (Chinese: 澳洲新快报), a simplified character Chinese-language newspaper published in Australia under the management of his daughter Winky Chow, a former ethnic policy affairs adviser to New South Wales State Premier Bob Carr. Carr presided over its official launch. The newspaper has engaged directly in promotion of Chinese government interests in Australia. In 2009, Chau told The Age in an interview, "[t]he Chinese government has found this newspaper very commendable because we never have any negative reporting." Chinese foreign policy expert Bates Gill cited The Australian New Express Daily as an example of Chinese government influence.

The Australian New Express Daily ceased printing newspapers in 2019 and eventually stopped updating its websites and social media in 2021.

== Personal life ==
Chau is married to his wife, So Chun Chau. They have three children, including their son, Eric, and daughter, Winky. Eric attended the University of Technology Sydney, studying design.

Chau has been noted as being friends with many individuals holding governmental power in Guangdong at one time, including Xie Fei (Guangdong CCP committee secretary from 1991 to 1998) and Lin Shusen (Guangzhou CCP deputy committee secretary in 1997 and party secretary in 2002). Chau stated his connections were due to his chairing of business groups.

In 2015, Chau paid a reported $70 million to buy the Vaucluse mansion 'La Mer' from Australian billionaire James Packer.

=== Net worth ===
Year	Financial Review Rich List		Forbes China Rich List	
Year	Rank	Net worth (A$)	Rank	Net worth (US$)
2017		$1.56 billion		
2018	45	$1.63 billion ▲	378	$0.90 billion ▼
2019	58 ▼	$1.55 billion ▼	n/a	not listed
2020	15 ▲	$4.60 billion ▲	n/a	not listed
2021	20 ▼	$4.57 billion ▼		
2022	23 ▼	$4.50 billion ▼		
2023	21 ▲	$4.43 billion ▼		
2024	28 ▲	$4.20 billion ▼		
2025	43 ▼	$3.72 billion ▼		

Legend
Icon	Description
Steady	Has not changed from the previous year
▲	Has increased from the previous year
▼	Has decreased from the previous year

=== Philanthropy ===
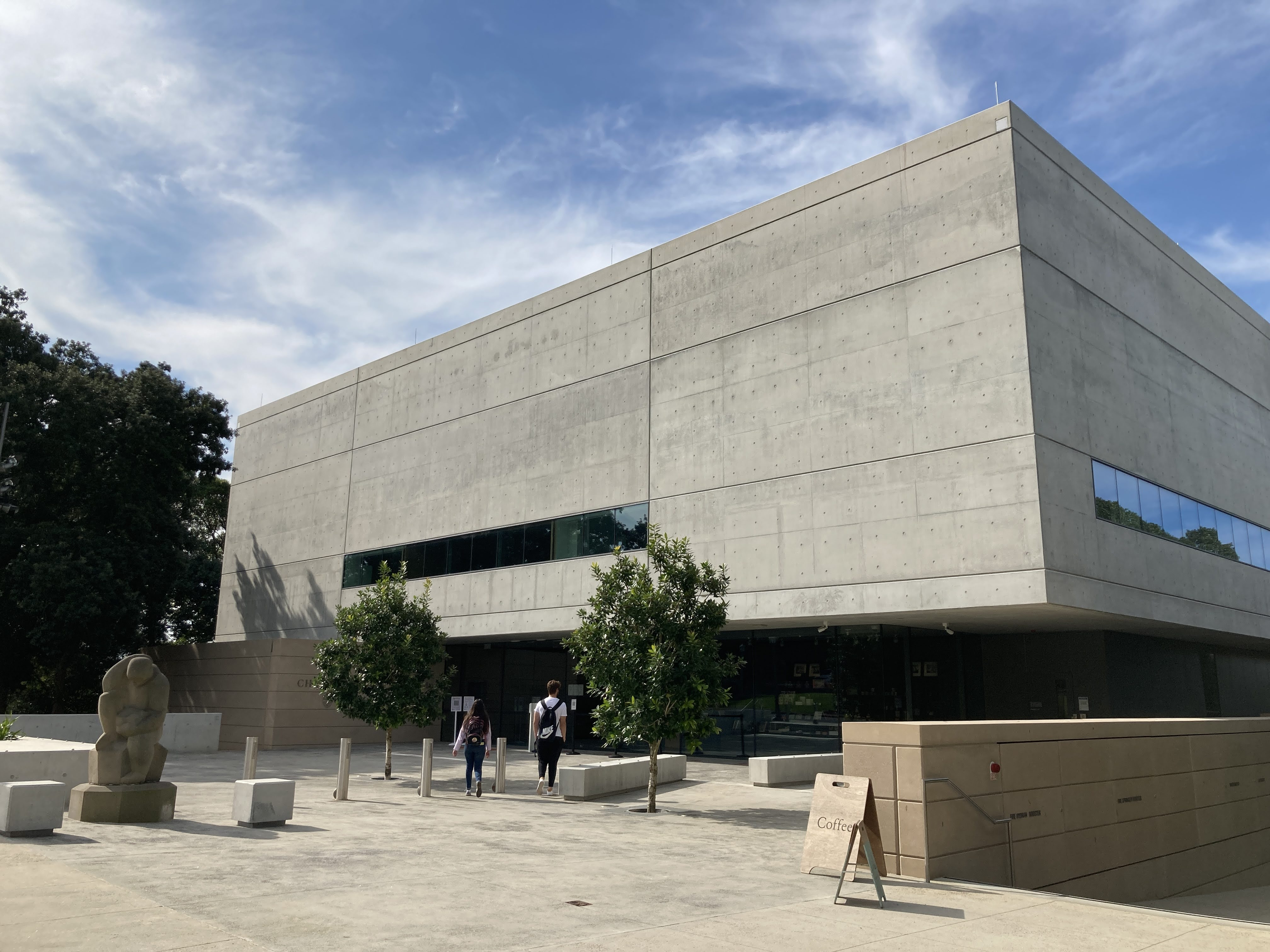
The Chau Chak Wing Museum at the University of Sydney

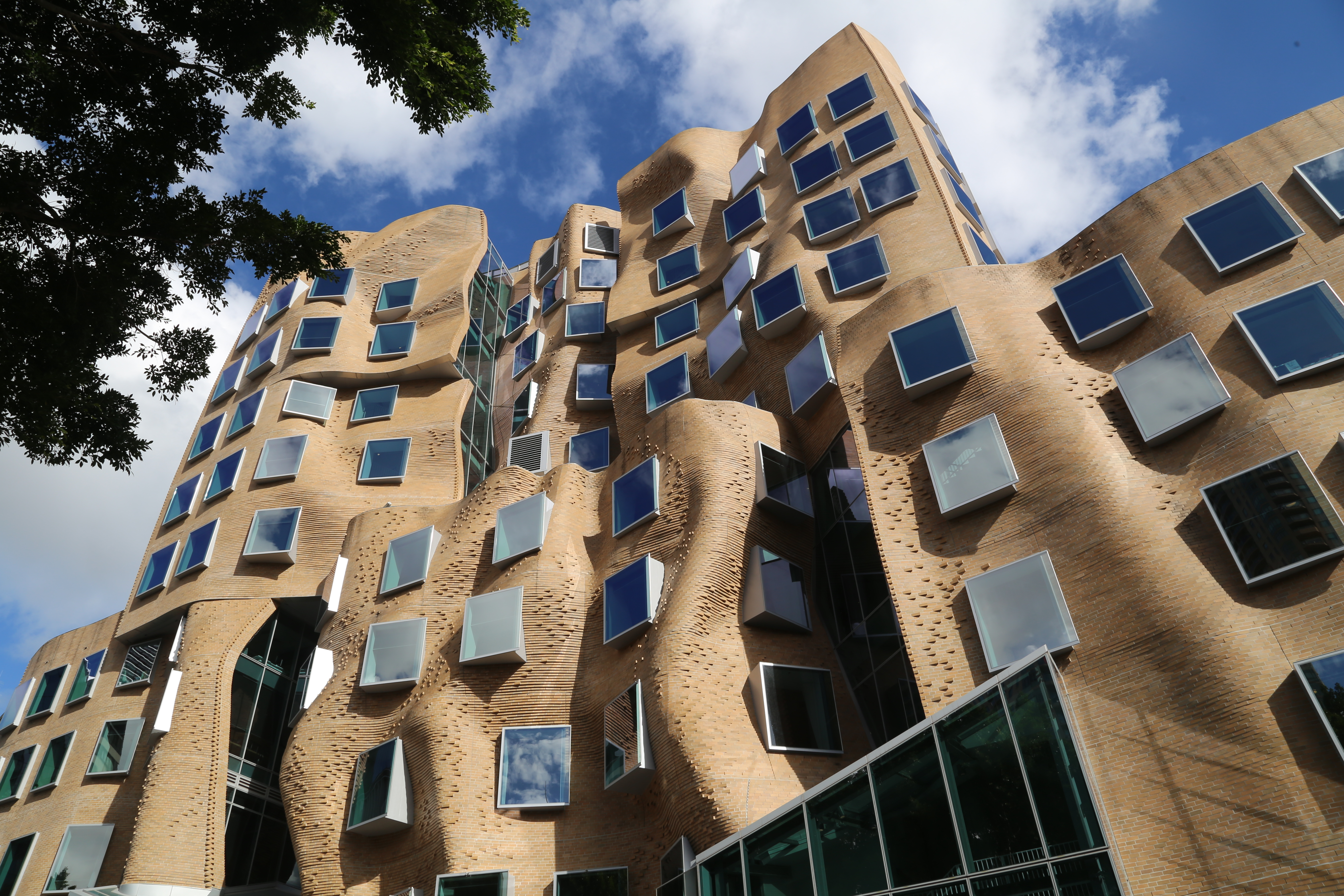
The Dr Chau Chak Wing Building at the University of Technology Sydney

In May 2009, Chau, then still domiciled in Guangzhou, donated CN¥3 million to a Chinese Public Security Bureau training centre in order that society "be well managed".

In 2010, Chau contributed A$20 million, in instalments over ten years, towards the A$150 million construction cost of the Dr Chau Chak Wing Building, part of the University of Technology Sydney (UTS), together with an ancillary A$5 million scholarship fund. The Dr Chau Chak Wing building was completed in 2013. Chau was awarded an honorary doctorate by UTS in 2014, shortly after completion of the UTS building bearing his name. In 2015, another A$15 million was contributed for the construction of the Chau Chak Wing Museum at the University of Sydney. The museum opened in 2020.

In 2015, Chau donated A$60,000 to the Australian War Memorial for the Anzac Diversity Education Program. He donated an additional A$500,000 for the creation of the Kingold Education and Media Centre. In 2019, Chau established the Chau Chak Wing Foundation. In November 2019, Chau donated A$500,000 to Soldier On, an Australian organization dedicated to supporting veterans and their families, and pledged additional donations.

=== Political donations ===
From 2014 to 2018, Chau donated approximately A$4 million to the two major Australian political parties.

== Controversies ==
=== FBI investigation of bribery and resulting litigation ===
Chau was named in a Federal Bureau of Investigation (FBI) probe in the case of bribery of the former president of the United Nations General Assembly, John Ashe. In 2013, the FBI alleged Sheri Yan (Shiwei Yan), an Australian-Chinese suspected by Australian Security Intelligence Organisation (ASIO) of Chinese intelligence activity, used A$200,000 of Chau's money to bribe John Ashe to attend a conference held at Chau's Imperial Springs resort in China. Yan pleaded guilty to bribery charges and served a 20-month prison sentence. Although Chau was never charged or accused of wrongdoing, he has also had documented ties to the CCP's United Front Work Department since at least 2007. This was detailed in a file written by the former US Consul General Robert Goldberg, who was based in Guangzhou. The file was initially distributed to American intelligence agencies, but in 2010 was in a leaked diplomatic cable.

In 2016, Chau brought defamation proceedings against Nationwide News Pty Ltd, the publisher of The Daily Telegraph and its sister company News Life Media Pty Ltd in the Federal Court of Australia, claiming that articles published in 2015 conveyed imputations that he himself had "bribed Mr. John Ashe". The proceedings were settled with Nationwide and News Life agreeing to pay Chau A$65,000 and publishing an apology on 23 December 2016.

In May 2018, Andrew Hastie, a former Chair of the Parliamentary Joint Committee on Intelligence and Security, used parliamentary privilege to claim Chau was an unindicted co-conspirator in the bribery case. Hastie's claim followed an April meeting that took place in New York with other members of the joint intelligence committee (David Fawcett and Jenny McAllister), two members of the American intelligence community, and an official from an Australian intelligence agency.

In February 2019, Chau obtained judgment in an action against Fairfax Media in New South Wales, establishing he had been defamed in The Sydney Morning Herald in a 2015 article about the affair. Fairfax Media said it would appeal. The appeal was rejected by the Federal Court in March 2020. Chau was awarded A$280,000 in damages, which he donated to various Australian charities.

=== Allegations of soft power over Australian politics and resulting litigation ===
A joint Four Corners and Fairfax Media investigation claimed that Chau, among others, was the subject of a briefing by ASIO warning of Chinese government influence over the Australian political system. In a follow-up article in The Australian, Chau said that claims he was an agent of Chinese soft power were "irrational". He said successive governments since the Howard era had sought his help in promoting Australian interests in China, including being asked to lobby for Australia to win a A$150 billion LNG deal with China in 2001. Chau sued for defamation over the news story. In February 2021 the Federal Court found in favour of Chau, and awarded him $590,000 in damages. The ABC was also prohibited from republishing some sections of the Four Corners episode.

==== Foreign election interference claims ====
In February 2022, Australian senator Kimberley Kitching used parliamentary privilege to suggest to Mike Burgess, the head of the Australian Security Intelligence Organisation, that Chau Chak Wing was the wealthy businessman behind an alleged Chinese plot to interfere in Australian elections to install politicians sympathetic to the interests of Chinese Communist Party. Chau issued a written statement denying the claim.
