= Roger Uren =

Australian author and former diplomat

- Born: 1947 (age 78–79)
- Education: MA, University of Melbourne
- Occupations: Author; Diplomat; Executive

Roger T. Uren is an Australian author and former diplomat who previously served as an Office of National Assessments official.

== Career ==
Uren served as a diplomat in Beijing and Washington for the Australian government. He also served as an assistant director for the Office of National Assessments (ONA) until his resignation in 2001, where he would go on to join Phoenix Television, eventually serving as the company's Vice President of International Affairs. He was once perceived as a candidate to become an ambassador to China for Australia.

Uren is also an author. He has previously published his work under the pen name John Byron.

=== Investigation ===
Uren and his wife Sheri Yan were investigated by the Australian Security Intelligence Organisation (ASIO) on suspicion of spying for China. Yan was suspected of undertaking influence operations on behalf of the Chinese Communist Party, and introducing Colonel Liu Chaoying, a military intelligence officer, to Australian contacts.

Uren, a former Assistant Secretary responsible for the Asia section of ONA, was found to have removed documents pertaining to Chinese intelligence operations in Australia, and kept them in his apartment. The documents were uncovered during a 2015 raid of his apartment in Canberra. Four years later, then-Attorney General Christian Porter approved Uren's prosecution, causing him to face 30 charges of unauthorized dealing with records. Porter released the following statement: "My consent was required as the charges relate to alleged offences under section 40J of the Intelligence Services Act 2001 and section 18A of the Australian Security Intelligence Organisation Act 1979, each of these offences have specifically required the Attorney's consent for a prosecution to proceed since they were introduced in 2014."

In September 2020, Uren plead guilty to three charges of unauthorized dealing with records. He avoided jail time but was required to pay a $7000 fine. Although it was legal to possess the documents at the time, Uren's actions became illegal in 2014 amid changes to Australia's national security legislation. Character references of Uren were read to the court from Geoff Raby (former Australian ambassador to China), Thomas Keneally (Australian novelist), and Greg Rudd (brother of former Prime Minister Kevin Rudd). Praise from former Australian Prime Minister John Howard and US President George W. Bush were included among the character references.

== Bibliography ==
- The China Lovers – A Novel of Murder and Treason (1985) ISBN 9789621000408
- Portrait of a Chinese Paradise – Erotica and Sexual Customs of the Late Qing Period (1987) ISBN 9780704326217
- The Claws of the Dragon – Kang Sheng, the Evil Genius Behind Mao and His Legacy of Terror in People's China (1992) ISBN 9780671695378
- To Eastern Lands – Reflections in Prose, Photographs and Verse of a Journey from Melbourne to Bombay, Beijing and Other Exotic Destinations (2013) ISBN 9789888227037

== Personal life ==
Uren is married to Sheri Yan. In 1996, they had a daughter.
