= Dr Chau Chak Wing Building =

University building in New South Wales, Australia

Coordinates: 33°52′51.87″S 151°12′4.89″E

- Dr Chau Chak Wing Building
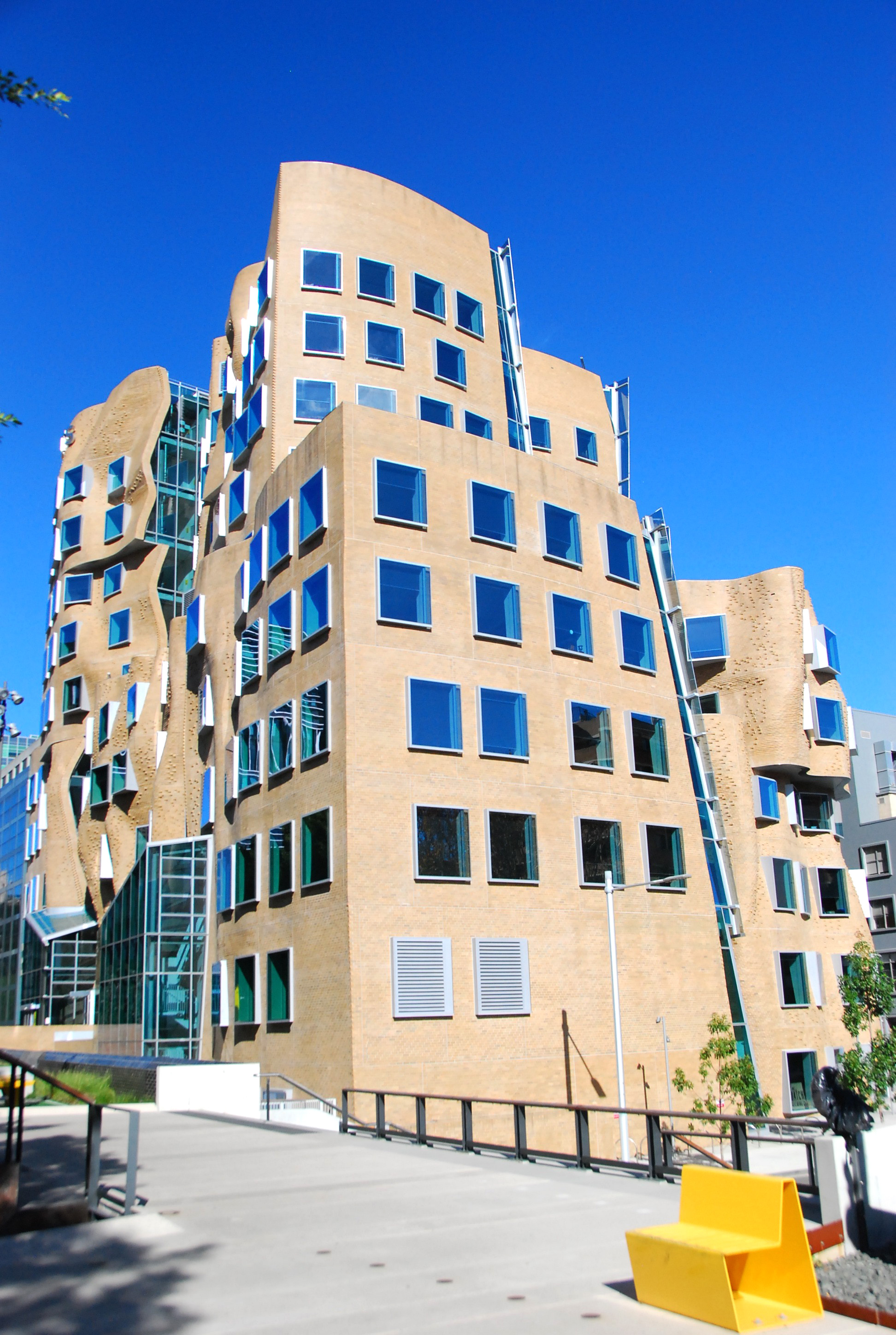

General information
- Status: Completed
- Type: Public
- Location: 14–28 Ultimo Road, Ultimo, New South Wales, Australia
- Construction started: Mid 2012
- Completed: 11 November 2014; 12 years ago
- Opened: 2 February 2015; 11 years ago
- Cost: $180 million
- Owner: University of Technology Sydney

Technical details
- Floor count: 12
- Floor area: 16,030 m^{2} (172,500 sq ft)

Design and construction
- Architect: Frank Gehry
- Architecture firm: Gehry Partners
- Structural engineer: Arup
- Services engineer: Aecom (also the brickwork design engineer)
- Other designers: Daryl Jackson, Robin Dyke
- Main contractor: Lendlease

Other information
- Seating type: Seminar rooms and classrooms
- Parking: 177 bicycles and 20 cars

The Dr Chau Chak Wing Building is a business school building of the University of Technology Sydney, Australia. Opened in 2015, it is the first and only building in the Southern Hemisphere to have been designed by the late Canadian American architect Frank Gehry.

== Description ==
The tower is named after Chau Chak Wing, a Chinese businessman who donated $20 million for the building's construction. The "Dr" in the building's name refers to honorary doctorates that have been conferred on Chau. The 13-storey tower provides teaching, learning, research and office accommodation for approximately 1,256 students and 326 academic staff. The building's design is based on the idea of a tree-house structure.

The building's façade, which was made of 320,000 custom-designed bricks, is described as the "squashed brown paper bag". Frank Gehry said, "Maybe it's a brown paper bag, but it's flexible on the inside, there's a lot of room for changes or movement."

An entrance from The Goods Line, a pedestrian pathway, is located on the eastern border of the site.

== Construction ==
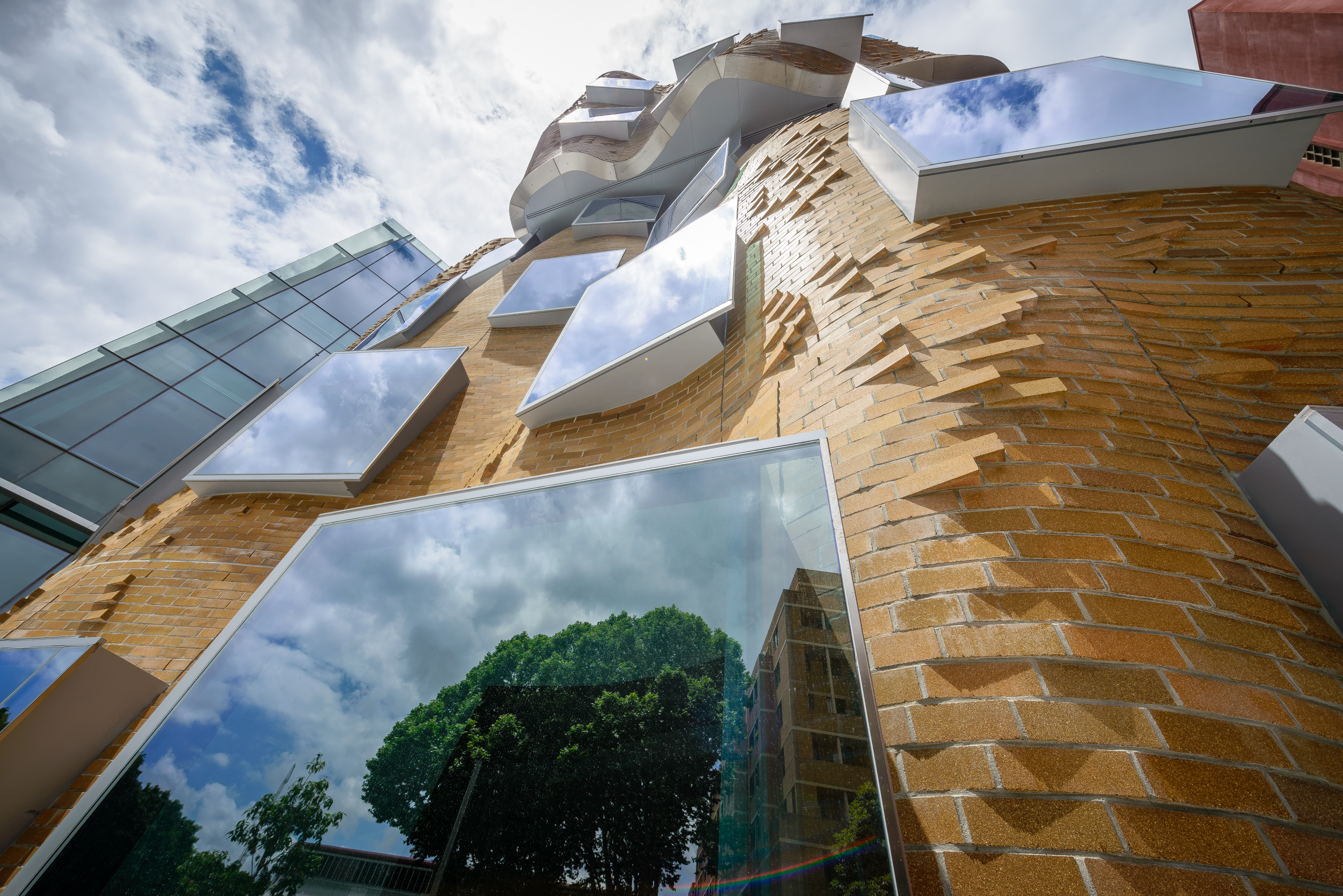
The building is constructed from 320,000 custom-designed bricks.

Early works on site and archaeological excavation were carried out from late 2011 until early 2012. The building was constructed by Lendlease which was appointed in November 2012.

Construction of the building started in late 2012. The building structure was topped-out in late 2013 and construction was completed in November 2014. The official opening took place on 2 February 2015.

== Awards ==
The building has won the following awards:

- 2015 AIQS Innovation Project Award
- 2015 Australian Timber Design Award People's Choice Award
- 2015 Good Design Awards: Product Design Hardware and Building
- 2015 Think Brick Awards: Horbury Hunt Commercial Award
- 2015 Master Builders Association NSW Awards: Tertiary Buildings Construction over $100m
- 2016 Australia Engineering Excellence Awards Bradfield Award

== See also ==
- Buildings and architecture of Sydney
- List of works by Frank Gehry
