= 1962 United Nations Security Council election =

Election to the United Nations Security Council

- 17 October 1962

4 (of 6) non-permanent seats on the United Nations Security Council
Members before election
Chile (LatAm&Car)
Ireland (WEOG)
Romania (Europe)
United Arab Republic (Middle East)
New Members
Brazil (LatAm&Car)
Netherlands (WEOG)
Philippines (Asia)
Morocco (Middle East)

The 1962 United Nations Security Council election was held on 17 October during the seventeenth session of the United Nations General Assembly, held at the United Nations Headquarters in New York City. The General Assembly elected four members, through consultation of the president, as non-permanent members of the UN Security Council for two-year mandates commencing on 1 January 1963.

The election saw Brazil, the Netherlands, the Philippines, and Morocco elected as non-permanent members. The Philippines were elected to the second half of a split term with Romania, who were elected in the previous election.

== Rules ==
The Security Council had eleven seats, filled by five permanent members and six non-permanent members. Each year, half of the non-permanent members are elected for two-year terms. A sitting member may not immediately run for re-election. Candidates must reach a required two-thirds majority to be elected to the United Nations Security Council.

== Results ==
At the time, the United Nations had 110 member states. Four seats were up for election as Chile, Ireland, Romania, and the United Arab Republic completed their terms. Due to a deadlock in the previous election, Romania agreed to a split term with the Philippines. As a result, the Philippines were elected to a non-permanent seat in the first ballot, receiving 95 votes. In the following ballot for the remaining three seats, Brazil and Norway were elected in the first round with 91 and 85 votes respectively. With one seat remaining, a second restricted round of voting took place, which saw Morocco elected after receiving 73 votes.

=== Split term ===
Member	Round 1
Philippines	95
Nigeria	2
Norway	2
Afghanistan	1
Romania	1
valid ballots	103
abstentions	2
present and voting	101
required majority	68

=== Other seats ===
Member	Round 1	Round 2
Brazil	91	—
Norway	85	—
Morocco	57	73
Nigeria	30	35
Iran	28	—
Afghanistan	5	—
Ethiopia	2	—
Burma	1	—
Haiti	1	—
Israel	1	—
Mauritania	1	—
valid ballots	109	109
abstentions	0	1
present and voting	109	108
required majority	73	72

== See also ==
- List of members of the United Nations Security Council
