= Vanuatu Post =

Post service in Vanuatu

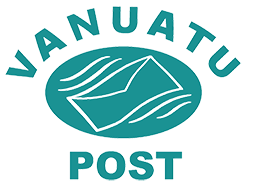
Logo of Vanuatu Post from the Vanuatu Post website, 2022.

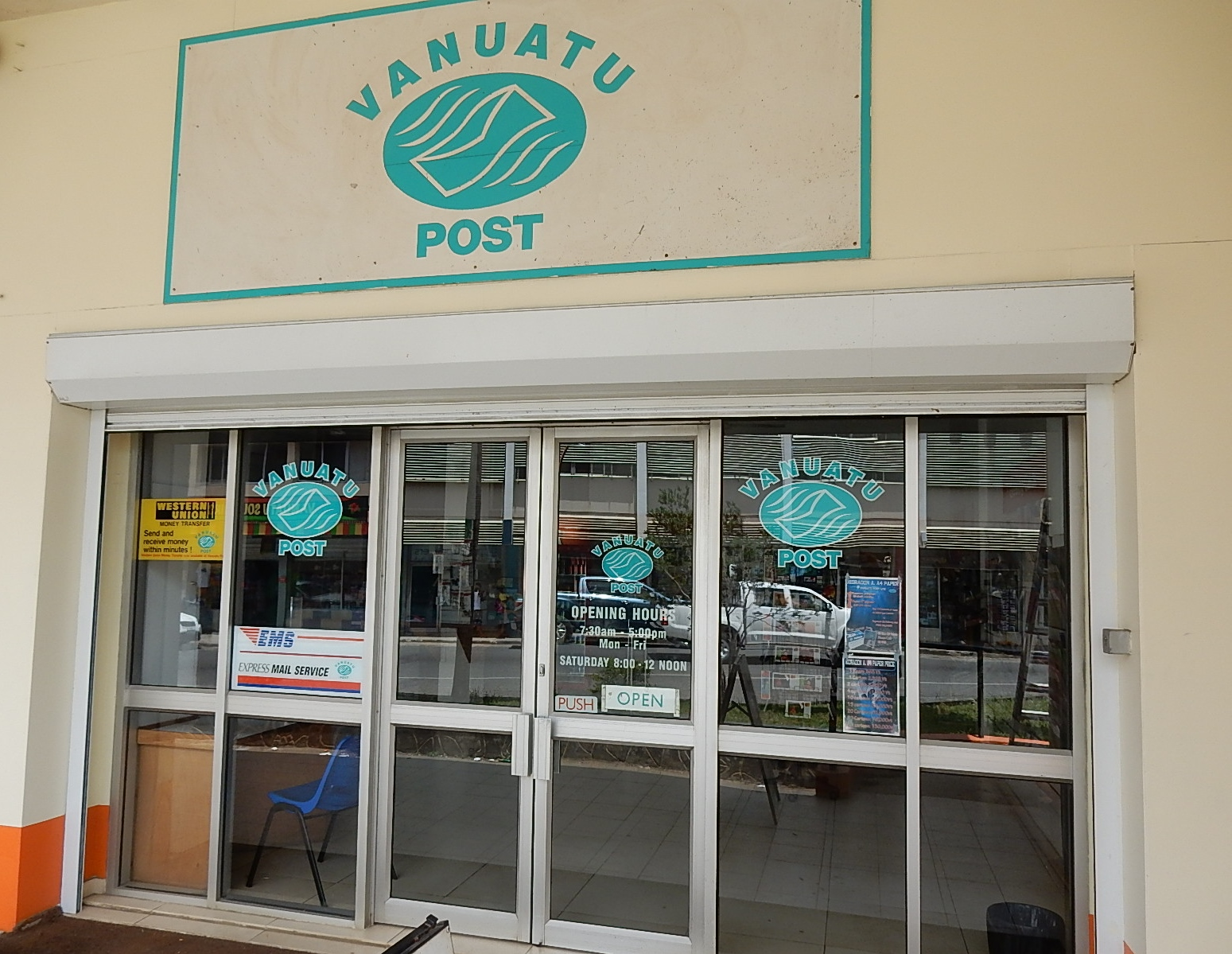
Post Office in Port Vila

Vanuatu Post is the national post office of Vanuatu. It runs the world's first underwater post office, which opened in 2003. It has been a member of the UPU (Universal Postal Union) since 16 July 1982.
