= 2013 United Nations Security Council election =

Election to the United Nations Security Council

- 17 October and 6 December 2013

5 of 10 non-permanent seats on the United Nations Security Council
- United Nations Security Council membership after the election Permanent members Non-permanent members
- Outgoing members Togo (Africa) Morocco (Africa)^{a} Pakistan (Asia–Pacific) Guatemala (GRULAC) Azerbaijan (EEG) a. Arab state Elected members Chad (Africa) Nigeria (Africa) Jordan (Asia–Pacific)^{a} Chile (GRULAC) Lithuania (EEG)

The 2013 United Nations Security Council election was held on 17 October 2013 during the 68th session of the United Nations General Assembly, held at United Nations Headquarters in New York City. The Assembly elected Chad, Chile, Lithuania, Nigeria, and Saudi Arabia for five non-permanent seats on the UN Security Council for two-year mandates commencing on 1 January 2014. The following day, Saudi Arabia announced that it was declining the seat, accusing UNSC of using "double standards" and being unable to resolve important issues in the Middle East. A second round of voting therefore took place on 6 December, in which Jordan was elected to the council in lieu of Saudi Arabia.

This was the first time Chad and Lithuania were elected members of the Security Council.

== Rules ==
The Security Council has 15 seats, filled by five permanent members and ten non-permanent members. Each year, half of the non-permanent members are elected for two-year terms. A sitting member may not immediately run for re-election.

In accordance with the rules whereby the ten non-permanent UNSC seats rotate among the various regional blocs into which UN member states traditionally divide themselves for voting and representation purposes, the five available seats are allocated as follows:

- Two for the African Group (held by Morocco and Togo)
- One for the Asia-Pacific Group (previously called the Asian Group), for the "Arab swing seat" (Note: The Arab swing seat alternates every two years between the Asian and the African groups.) (held by Pakistan)
- One for the Latin American and Caribbean Group (held by Guatemala)
- One for the Eastern European Group (held by Azerbaijan)

To be elected, a candidate must receive a two-thirds majority of those present and voting. If the vote is inconclusive after the first round, three rounds of restricted voting shall take place, followed by three rounds of unrestricted voting, and so on, until a result has been obtained. In restricted voting, only official candidates may be voted on, while in unrestricted voting, any member of the given regional group, with the exception of current Council members, may be voted on.

The five members are expected to serve on the Security Council for the 2014–15 period.

== Candidates ==
=== African Group ===
Chad
Nigeria
Gambia — Withdrew

=== Asia-Pacific group ===
An Arab state is due to take a seat on account of the custom of rotation of the unofficial "Arab seat" between the Arab states belonging to the African and Asian groups and the expiry of the term of the previous Arab member, Morocco, whose term expires in 2013.

Saudi Arabia
Jordan — Declared candidacy after Saudi Arabia declined its election to the Council

=== Latin American and Caribbean Group ===
Chile

=== Eastern European group ===
Lithuania
Georgia — Withdrew on 30 April 2013 for diplomatic and financial reasons

== Results ==
=== African and Asia-Pacific Groups ===
==== Day 1 ====
African and Asia-Pacific Groups election results
Member	Round 1
Nigeria	186
Chad	184
Saudi Arabia	176
Senegal	2
Gambia	2
Lebanon	1
valid ballots	191
abstentions	0
present and voting	191
required majority	128

==== Rejection ====
Following the vote, Saudi Arabia, despite winning a seat, declined to take it, citing the UNSC's "double standards" in being allegedly ineffective in regards to the Israeli–Palestinian conflict, nuclear disarmament in the Middle East and putting an end to the Syrian civil war. This was the first time a state had rejected a Security Council seat. Saudi Arabia's refusal of the seat surprised both United Nations diplomats and some observers inside the country, where the announcement of the election had been received favorably. The Gulf Cooperation Council supported Saudi Arabia's bid. In addition, Saudi intelligence chief Prince Bandar bin Sultan suggested a distancing of Saudi Arabia–United States relations as a result of the same issue over the Syrian civil war, amongst other reasons. On 12 November, Saudi Arabia formally declined the seat, advising the Secretary-General that it "would not be in a position to take the seat on the Security Council to which it was elected."

==== Day 2 ====
A second vote was held on 6 December to fill the vacancy created by the rejection of Saudi Arabia to take the seat it was elected to. Prior to the vote, the General Assembly honoured Nelson Mandela, who had died the previous day. There were 185 ballot papers.

African and Asia-Pacific States election results
Member	Round 1
Jordan	178
Saudi Arabia	1
valid ballots	183
invalid ballots	2
abstentions	4
present and voting	179
required majority	120

=== Latin American and Caribbean Group ===
Latin American and Caribbean Group election results
Member	Round 1
Chile	186
valid ballots	191
abstentions	5
present and voting	186
required majority	124

=== Eastern European Group ===
Eastern European Group election results
Member	Round 1
Lithuania	187
Croatia	1
valid ballots	190
invalid ballots	1
abstentions	2
present and voting	188
required majority	126

== See also ==
- List of members of the United Nations Security Council
