= Sixty-eighth session of the United Nations General Assembly =

- 17 September 2013 – 16 September 2014 68th session 68th general debate
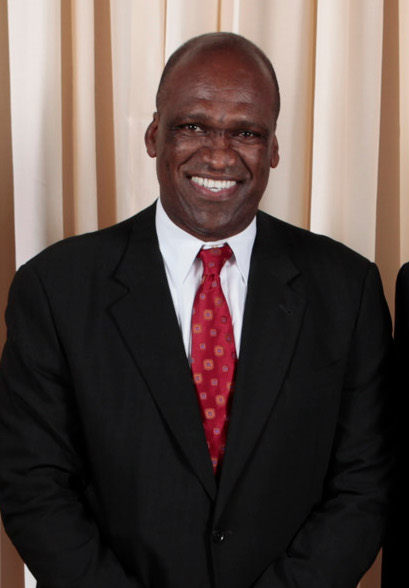
- President of the 68th General Assembly; John William Ashe
- Host country: United Nations
- Cities: New York City
- Venues: General Assembly Hall at the United Nations Headquarters
- Participants: Member States of the United Nations
- Secretary-General: Ban Ki-moon
- Website: www.un.org/en/ga/68

The sixty-eighth session of the United Nations General Assembly opened on 17 September 2013. The president of the United Nations General Assembly was chosen from the GRULAC with Antigua and Barbuda's John William Ashe being the consensus candidate, thus bypassing the need for an election.

== Organisation for the session ==
In December 2011, Antigua and Barbuda's UN Ambassador John William Ashe was chosen as the consensus candidate by all 33 GRULAC member states to be the president of the United Nations General Assembly, thus not necessitating an election. In opening remarks to the General Assembly, Ashe said: "The upcoming year will be pivotal for this Assembly as we seek to identify the parameters of the post-2015 development agenda. The magnitude of the task before us will require decisive action and the highest levels of collaboration and we must prove ourselves and our efforts to be equal to the enormity of the task. We simply cannot reach our development goals, or advance human well-being without addressing the needs and challenges of women and youth, while also making use of the contributions of them both. With some 1.4 billion people without reliable electricity; 900 million lacking access to clean water and 2.6 billion without adequate sanitation, action is urgently needed to address these persistent challenges. With so many initiatives in these three fields, let us try and draw upon and share the existing knowledge, while scaling up initiatives that have already worked in the areas of integrated water management, sustainable energy and sanitation services for the proposed post-2015 development agenda." Secretary-General Ban Ki-moon then said: "We will intensify our efforts to define a post-2015 development agenda, including with a single set of goals for sustainable development that we hope will address the complex challenges of this new era and capture the imagination of the people of the world, as the MDGs did. Syria is without doubt the biggest crisis facing the international community. The Assembly has a role and a voice in our efforts to resolve it and respond to the suffering."

As is tradition during each session of the General Assembly, Secretary-General Ban Ki-moon will draw lots to see which member state would take the helm at the first seat in the General Assembly Chamber, with the other member states following according to the English translation of their name, the same order would be followed in the six main committees. This year Croatia was drawn to take the first seat.

The chairmen and officers of the six Main Committees will also be elected: First Committee (Disarmament and International Security Committee);Second Committee (Economic and Financial Committee); Third Committee (Social, Humanitarian and Cultural Committee); Fourth Committee (Special Political and Decolonization Committee); Fifth Committee (Administrative and Budgetary Committee); and the Sixth Committee (Legal Committee) .

There will also be nineteen vice-presidents of the UNGA.

At the opening of the session, UN Secretary-General Ban Ki-moon spoke of a need for an accelerated Millennium Development Goals and of the need to find a resolution to the Syrian civil war.

=== General debate ===
Most states will have a representative speaking about issues concerning their country and the hopes for the coming year as to what the UNGA will do. This is as opportunity for the member states to opine on international issues of their concern. The General Debate will run from 24 to 27 September and 30 September- 1 October.

The order of speakers is given first to member states, then observer states and supranational bodies. Any other observers entities will have a chance to speak at the end of the debate, if they so choose. Speakers will be put on the list in the order of their request, with special consideration for ministers and other government officials of similar or higher rank. According to the rules in place for the General Debate, the statements should be in one of the United Nations official languages of Arabic, Chinese, English, French, Russian or Spanish, and will be translated by the United Nations translators. Each speaker is requested to provide 20 advance copies of their statements to the conference officers to facilitate translation and to be presented at the podium. Speeches are requested to be limited to five minutes, with seven minutes for supranational bodies. President John William Ashe chose the theme: "The Post-2015 Development Agenda: Setting the Stage!." This means he calls on member states and other stakeholders "to promote dialogue, reflection and commitment to the formulation of an effective new agenda to overcome poverty and insecurity and ensure sustainable development. Long term sustainable development was also a goal.

Though all member states are welcome to participate in the General Assembly's General Debate regardless of other diplomatic relations as the United Nations is not considered a part of any country, the United States Department of State said that it has rejected Sudanese President Omar al-Bashir's visa application on the groups that he was charged with war crimes. The Sudanese Foreign Ministry released a statement that read the United States too had committed war crimes and genocide, including the invasion of Iraq in Operation Iraqi Freedom that resulted in over one million deaths. It also reiterated Sudan's adherence to its full right in participating at the meetings of the session and urged the United States to fulfill its duties and issue the necessary entry visa as soon as possible. He later confirmed he would attend the session on a flight to New York City via Morocco. However, he cancelled at the eleventh hour.

== Agenda ==
President John William Ashe chose the theme of the session as "The Post 2015 Development Agenda: Setting the Stage."

=== Issues ===
Other issues for the session are migration, nuclear disarmament, the MDGs and disabilities and a High-Level thematic debate, mandated by the General Assembly, on investment in Africa and its role in achieving development objectives. United Nations Security Council reform will also be an issue, though according to Ashe it will be an uphill battle.

== Resolutions ==
Resolutions came before the UNGA between October 2013 and summer 2014. Notable resolutions include 68/262 in regards to the annexation of Crimea by the Russian Federation.

== Elections ==
The election of non-permanent members to the Security Council for 2014–2015 was held in October 2013. Outgoing members were: Morocco, Togo, Guatemala, Pakistan and Azerbaijan. Incoming members are Chad, Nigeria, Lithuania and Chile. While Saudi Arabia were elected they declined to take the role citing "double standards" and calling the body ineffective in dealing with the Syrian civil war. Jordan then took its place.

An election to choose 18 members of the United Nations Human Rights Council for a three-year term will take place. The outgoing states are: Angola, Ecuador, Guatemala, Libya, Malaysia, Maldives, Mauritania, Moldova, Qatar, Spain, Switzerland and Thailand. Declared losing candidates were South Sudan (89) and Uruguay (93). Others who received votes were: Andorra, Iran, Jordan, Greece, Latvia, Luxembourg, Portugal San Marino, Singapore, Slovakia, Thailand and Tunisia. All received just one vote except Jordan, who got 16 votes, and Tunisia, who got two votes. On 12 November, those elected were Algeria (164), China (176), Cuba (148), France (174), Macedonia (177), Maldives (164), Mexico (135), Morocco (163), Namibia (150), Russia (176), Saudi Arabia (140), the United Kingdom (171)and Vietnam (184), amid controversy. Namibia, Macedonia and Vietnam were elected for the first time. The minimum required votes was 97. In reaction the U.S. State Department spokeswoman Jen Psaki said: "We regret that some countries elected to the Human Rights Council have failed to show their commitment to the promotion and protection of human rights. [The council was able to] work together and make progress [when Russia, China and Cuba were members and] that is what we are hopeful of with the council moving forward."

== See also ==
- List of UN General Assembly sessions
- List of General debates of the United Nations General Assembly
