= John William Ashe =

President of the 68th UN General Assembly

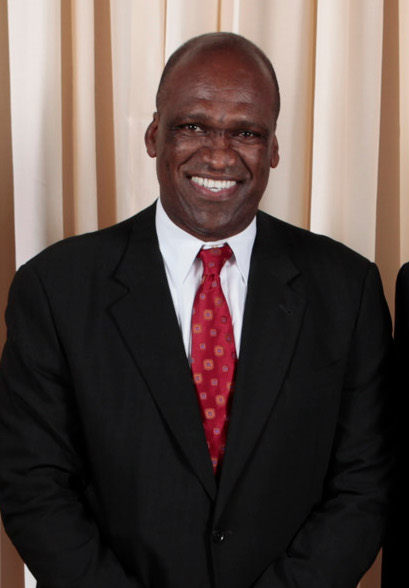
- Ashe in 2009

President of the United Nations General Assembly
- In office 17 September 2013 – 16 September 2014
- Preceded by: Vuk Jeremić
- Succeeded by: Sam Kutesa

President of UNICEF
- In office 2012
- Preceded by: Sanja Štiglic
- Succeeded by: Jarmo Viinanen

Permanent Representative to the United Nations in New York City of Antigua and Barbuda
- In office 1995–2004

Personal details
- Born: 20 August 1954 St. John's, Antigua and Barbuda
- Died: 22 June 2016 (aged 61) Dobbs Ferry, New York, U.S.
- Education: University of Pennsylvania MSE, PhD (Bioengineering); Technical Univ. of Nova Scotia MSE (Electrical Engineering); Saint Mary's University

John William Ashe (20 August 1954 – 22 June 2016) was an Antiguan diplomat and politician. He was the President of the United Nations General Assembly at its 68th session, which ran September 2013 to September 2014. He was also President of the UNICEF Executive Board in 2012. He served as Permanent Representative to the United Nations in New York City of Antigua and Barbuda between 1995 and 2004.

== Early life and education ==
Ashe was born in St. John's, Antigua. His parents did not complete high school. His paternal grandfather gave his signature as an "X" and his mother, in turn, was a descendant of slave plantation owners in Barbados. Consequently, Ashe was the first in his family to attend university. He was a graduate of St. Mary's University in Nova Scotia and the Technical University of Nova Scotia, and in 1989 graduated from the University of Pennsylvania with a PhD in Bioengineering.

== Political career ==
From 1989 to 1995, he worked for his country's Permanent Mission to the United Nations as Scientific Attaché, Counsellor and Minister Counsellor. Between 1995 and 2004, he was Antigua and Barbuda's Deputy Permanent Representative to the United Nations. He served as chairman of the thirteenth session of the Commission on Sustainable Development, which met at United Nations Headquarters on 11–22 April 2005.

In April 2009, he was elected chair of the Ad Hoc Working Group on Further Commitments for Annex I Parties under the Kyoto Protocol (AWG-KP), and was responsible for overseeing negotiations leading up to and including the final phase at the 2009 United Nations Climate Change Conference in Copenhagen. Towards the end of 2011, Ashe was the consensus candidate of all 33 GRULAC members states to be the president of the 68th session of the UNGA, thus not necessitating an election, unlike his predecessor Vuk Jeremić who was challenged in an election to preside over the 67th session.

Ashe led negotiations on budgetary and administrative matters within the conventions on biological diversity and desertification, the Basel Convention and the Montreal Protocol. He served on the executive boards of the United Nations Development Programme (UNDP)/United Nations Population Fund (UNFPA) and the United Nations Children's Fund (UNICEF). He was also his country's ambassador to the World Trade Organization (WTO) and had ministerial responsibility for WTO and sustainable development matters.

According to Farrukh Khan, the Program Manager on Climate Finance at the UN Secretary General's Office, Ashe played a central role in the negotiations for the Sustainable Development Goals (SDGs). On 22 September 2014 Ashe launched the Global Sustainable Development Foundation to support the Millennium Development Goals (MDGs) and the SDGs. It was to "support the UN's mission and accelerate the achievement of the MDGs and SDGs".

== Bribery charge in U.S. court ==
On 6 October 2015, Ashe was arrested and charged, along with five others, in a criminal complaint filed by federal prosecutors in the U.S. District Court for the Southern District of New York, reflecting an expansion of a probe into the dealings of Macau real estate developer Ng Lap Seng. The complaint accused Ashe of using "his official position to obtain for Ng potentially lucrative investments in Antigua" as part of an alleged broader scheme to funnel more than $1 million in bribes from Chinese sources to facilitate business dealings, particularly in real estate. He died while awaiting trial.

== Death ==
Ashe was found dead at his home in Dobbs Ferry, New York, on June 22, 2016. The Westchester County, New York medical examiner's office reported that Ashe died of injuries (specifically, traumatic asphyxia, and laryngeal fractures) suffered when a barbell he was lifting from a bench dropped on his neck.

Ashe was survived by his wife, Anilla Cherian, and two children. One of John William Ashe brothers is Paul Ashe, currently Chief Regulatory Officer of Antiguan Financial Services Regulatory Commission (FSRC).

Positions in intergovernmental organisations
Preceded by Vuk Jeremić	President of the United Nations General Assembly; 2013–2014	Succeeded by Sam Kutesa
