= Berenado Vunibobo =

Fijian diplomat (1932–2015)

H.E. Berenado Vunibobo
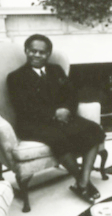
- Berenado Vunibobo in November 1976

Permanent representative to the United Nations for the Fiji Islands
- In office 2008–2010
- Preceded by: Isikia Savua
- Succeeded by: Peter Thomson
- In office 1978–1980
- Preceded by: Semesa Sikivou
- Succeeded by: Filipe Bole

Personal details
- Born: 24 September 1932 Nukutubu village, Rewa, Fiji
- Died: 27 December 2015 (aged 83) Tamavua, Suva, Fiji

Berenado Vunibobo CBE (24 September 1932 – 27 December 2015) was Fiji's permanent representative to the United Nations from 1976 to 1980 and from 2008 to 2010, and minister for foreign affairs, international co-operation and civil aviation 1997–1998. During his second term, he represented the unelected Fiji government led by Commodore Voreqe Bainimarama. Vunibobo's predecessor, Isikia Savua, had suggested that one of his tasks would be to counteract potential pressure from countries such as Australia or New Zealand who might seek to have Fiji removed from United Nations peacekeeping operations. which indeed they did. Vunibobo agreed with the assessment, and said:

"The biggest challenge for me, looking at our current situation, is to try and update various people of the developments here in our country. We lack the resources our critics have and we can see that these critics are putting pressure on the UN and British government not to recruit peacekeepers from Fiji."

He was succeeded in February 2010 by Peter Thomson.

Vunibobo was also the minister of finance from 1994 to 1997 in the cabinet of Sitiveni Rabuka.

He died on 27 December 2015, aged 83.

== See also ==
- Fiji and the United Nations
