= General debate of the seventy-first session of the United Nations General Assembly =

United Nations General Debate Assembly

- 20–26 September 2016 71st session 71st general debate

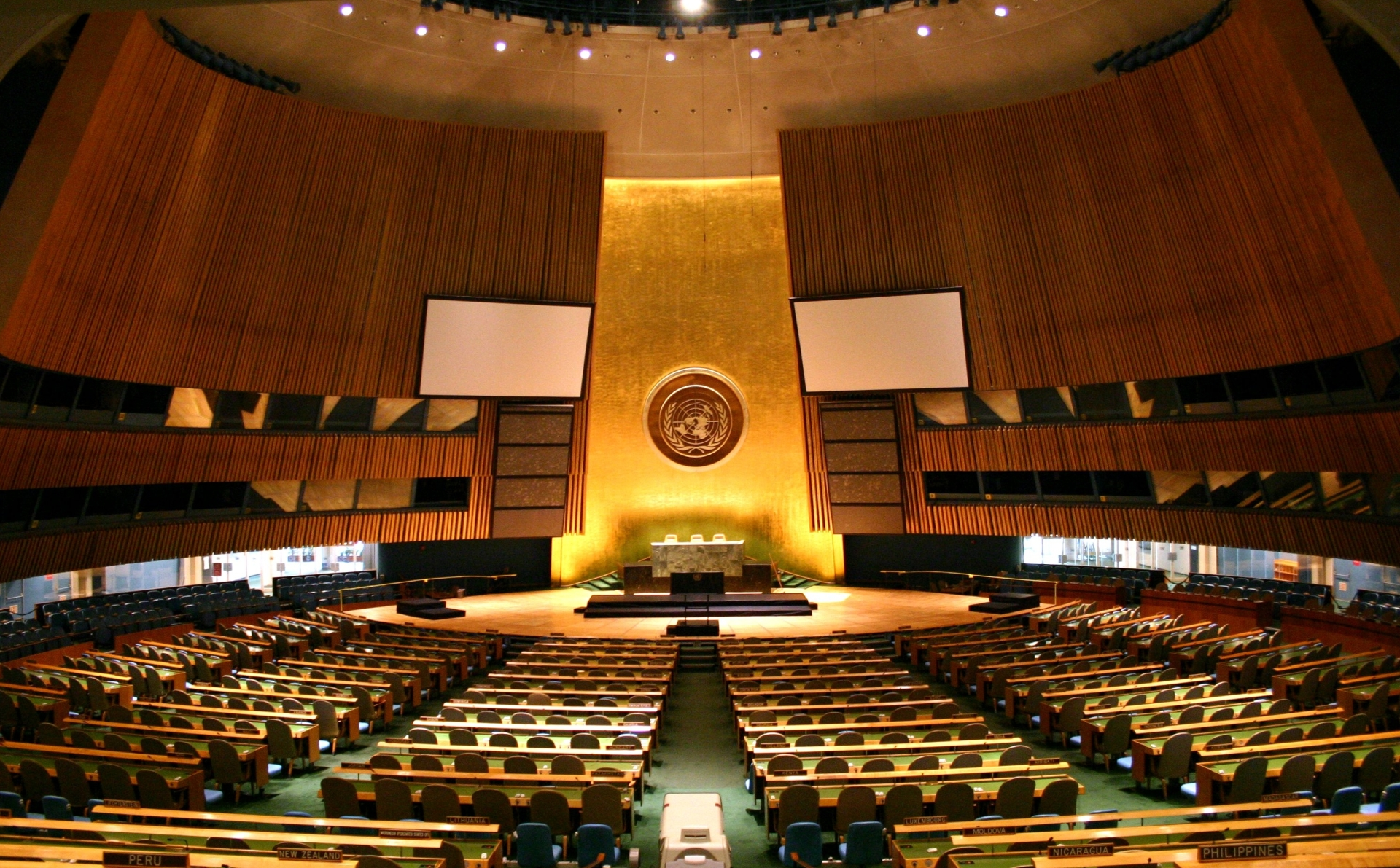
- General Assembly Hall at United Nations Headquarters, New York City
- Host country: United Nations
- Cities: New York City, United States
- Venues: General Assembly Hall at the United Nations Headquarters
- Participants: United Nations Member States
- President: Peter Thomson
- Secretary-General: Ban Ki-moon
- Website: gadebate.un.org/en/sessions-archive/71

The General debate of the seventy-first session of the United Nations General Assembly commenced on 20 September and ended on 28 September 2016. Leaders from a number of member states addressed the UNGA.

== Organisation and subjects ==
The order of speakers is given first to member states, then observer states and supranational bodies. Any other observers entities will have a chance to speak at the end of the debate, if they so choose. Speakers will be put on the list in the order of their request, with special consideration for ministers and other government officials of similar or higher rank. According to the rules in place for the General Debate, the statements should be in of the United Nations official languages of Arabic, Chinese, English, French, Russian or Spanish, and will be translated by the United Nations translators. Each speaker is requested to provide 20 copies of their statements in advance to the conference officers to facilitate translation and to be presented at the podium. Though there is no time limit for speeches, a voluntary guideline of 15 minutes is requested. The chosen theme for the debate is "The Sustainable Development Goals: a [sic] universal push to transform our world."

== Speaking schedule ==
=== 20 September ===
Morning schedule

- United Nations – Secretary-General Ban Ki-moon
- United Nations – 71st Session of the United Nations General Assembly - President Peter Thomson (Opening statement)
- Brazil – President Michel Temer (Note: First speech to the UNGA General Debate.)
- Chad – President Idriss Déby
- United States – President Barack Obama
- Chad – President Idriss Déby (Scheduled)
- Slovakia – President Andrej Kiska
- France – President François Hollande (Scheduled)
- Guyana – President David Arthur Granger
- Qatar – Emir Sheikh Tamim Bin Hamad al-Thani
- Argentina – President Mauricio Macri (Note: First speech to the UNGA General Debate.)
- Slovakia – President Andrej Kiska (Scheduled)
- Malawi – President Arthur Peter Mutharika
- Uruguay – President Tabaré Vázquez
- Jordan – King Abdullah II Ibn al-Hussein
- Switzerland – President Johann Schneider-Ammann
- Peru – President Pedro Pablo Kuzcynski Godard
- Turkey – President Recep Tayyip Erdoğan
- Fiji – Prime Minister Josaia Voreqe Bainimarama
- United Kingdom of Great Britain and Northern Ireland – Prime Minister Theresa May
- Canada – Prime Minister Justin Trudeau

Afternoon schedule (Note: Session started immediately after a formal closing of the previous one.)

- Morocco – King Mohammed VI (Scheduled)
- Tunisia – President Beji Caid Essebsi
- Poland – President Andrzej Duda
- South Africa – President Jacob Zuma
- Spain – King Don Felipe VI (Scheduled)
- Slovenia – President Borut Pahor
- Egypt – President Abdel Fattah el-Sisi
- Nigeria – President Muhammadu Buhari
- Uganda – President Yoweri Kaguta Museveni
- Portugal – President Marcelo Rebelo de Sousa
- Mexico – President Enrique Peña Nieto
- Slovenia – President Borut Pahor (Scheduled)
- Spain – King Don Felipe VI
- Zambia – President Edgar Chagwa Lungu
- Panama – President Juan Carlos Varela Rodríguez
- Costa Rica – President Luis Guillermo Solís Rivera
- Mongolia – President Tsakhiagiin Elbegdorj
- Senegal – President Macky Sall
- Tunisia – President Beji Caid Essebsi (Scheduled)
- New Zealand – Prime Minister John Key
- Italy – Prime Minister Matteo Renzi

=== 21 September ===
Morning schedule

- Finland – President Sauli Niinistö
- Zimbabwe – President Robert Mugabe
- Chile – President Michelle Bachelet Jeria
- Namibia – President Hage Geingob
- China – Premier Li Keqiang
- Namibia – President Hage Geingob (Scheduled)
- Colombia – President Juan Manuel Santos Calderon
- Ghana – President John Dramani Mahama
- Afghanistan – Vice President Sarwar Danesh
- Ukraine – President Petro Poroshenko (Scheduled)
- European Union – President Donald Tusk
- Ukraine – President Petro Poroshenko
- Kenya – Vice President William Ruto
- Saudi Arabia – Crown Prince Mohammed bin Naif bin Abdulaziz Al-Saud
- Myanmar – Foreign Minister Aung San Suu Kyi (Scheduled)
- Kuwait – Prime Minister Sheikh Jaber Al-Mubarak Al-Hamad Al Sabah
- Pakistan – Prime Minister Nawaz Sharif
- Myanmar – Foreign Minister Aung San Suu Kyi
- Kenya – Vice President William Ruto (Scheduled)
- Afghanistan – Second Vice President Sarwar Danesh (Scheduled)
- Japan – Prime Minister Shinzo Abe
- Kuwait – Prime Minister Sheikh Jaber Al-Mubarak Al-Hamad Al Sabah (Scheduled)
- Pakistan – Prime Minister Nawaz Sharif (Scheduled)
- Montenegro – Prime Minister Milo Ðukanović (Scheduled)

Afternoon schedule

- Togo – President Faure Essozimna Gnassingbé (Scheduled)
- Croatia – President Kolinda Grabar-Kitarović
- Dominican Republic – President Danilo Medina Sánchez
- Sri Lanka – President Maithripala Sirisena
- Micronesia – President Peter Christian
- Latvia – President Raimonds Vējonis
- Bosnia and Herzegovina – Chairman of the Presidency Bakir Izetbegović
- Guinea-Bissau – President José Mário Vaz
- Czech Republic – President Miloš Zeman
- Bolivia – President Evo Morales Ayma
- Mozambique – President Filipe Jacinto Nyusi
- Estonia – President Toomas Hendrik Ilves
- Nauru – President Baron Divavesi Waqa
- Honduras – President Juan Orlando Hernández Alvarado
- Gambia – Vice President Isatou Njie Saidy
- Ethiopia – Prime Minister Hailemariam Dessalegn
- Romania – Prime Minister Dacian Julien Cioloș
- Bangladesh – Prime Minister Sheikh Hasina
- Georgia – Prime Minister Giorgi Kvirikashvili
- Australia – Prime Minister Malcolm Turnbull
- Thailand – Prime Minister General Prayut Chan-o-cha
- Montenegro – Prime Minister Milo Đukanović (Scheduled)
- Austria – Minister for Europe, Integration and Foreign Affairs Sebastian Kurz

==== Right of Reply ====
Member states have the option to reply to comments on the day (or even to the days prior), but are limited to 10 minutes for the first response and five minutes for the second response. All speeches are made from the floor, as opposed to the podium for the General Debate.

India used its right against the speech by Pakistan.

=== 22 September ===
Morning schedule

- Cameroon – President Paul Biya
- Cyprus – President Nicos Anastasiades
- Sierra Leone – President Ernest Bai Koroma
- Lithuania – President Dalia Grybauskaité
- El Salvador – President Salvador Sánchez Cerén
- Iran – President Hassan Rouhani
- Madagascar – President Hery Martial Rajaonarimampianina Rakotoarimanana
- Kiribati – President Taneti Maamau
- Benin – President Patrice Athanase Guillaume Talon
- Ivory Coast – President Alassane Ouattara
- Madagascar – President Hery Martial Rajaonarimampianina Rakotoarimanana (Scheduled)
- Palestine – President Mahmoud Abbas
- Norway – Prime Minister Erna Solberg
- Israel – Prime Minister Benjamin Netanyahu
- Monaco – Head of Government Serge Telle
- Lebanon – President of the Council of MinistersTammam Salam (Note: Salam is also the acting president amid electoral deadlock.)
- Iraq – Prime Minister Haider Al-Abadi
- Netherlands – Foreign Minister Albert Koenders
- Holy See – Secretary of State Cardinal Pietro Parolin

Afternoon schedule

- Bulgaria – President Rosen Plevneliev
- Rwanda – President Paul Kagame
- Liberia – President Ellen Johnson-Sirleaf
- Burkina Faso – President Roch Marc Christian Kaboré
- Macedonia – President Gjorge Ivanov
- Marshall Islands – President Hilda Heine
- Libya – President Faiez Mustafa Serraj (Scheduled)
- Angola – Vice President Manuel Domingos Vicente
- Guatemala – President Jimmy Morales
- Angola – Vice President Manuel Domingos Vicente (Scheduled)
- Guatemala – President Jimmy Morales (Scheduled)
- Libya – President Faiez Mustafa Serraj (Note: The government of Libya is disputed between a parliament sitting in the national capital of Tripoli and another that is temporarily sitting in Tobruk.)
- Venezuela – Foreign Minister Delcy Eloína Rodríguez Gómez (Scheduled)
- Serbia – Prime Minister Aleksandar Vučić
- Greece – Prime Minister Alexis Tsipras (Scheduled)
- Malta – Prime Minister Joseph Muscat (Scheduled)
- Algeria – Deputy Prime Minister Ramtane Lamamra
- Turkmenistan – Foreign Minister Rashid Meredov
- Greece – Prime Minister Alexis Tsipras
- Kazakhstan – Foreign Minister Erlan Idrissov
- Cuba – Foreign Minister Bruno Eduardo Rodríguez Parrilla
- Malta – Prime Minister Joseph Muscat
- Netherlands – Foreign Minister Albert Koenders (Scheduled)
- South Korea – Foreign Minister Yun Byung-se (Scheduled)
- Equatorial Guinea – Foreign Minister Agapito Mba Mokuy
- Paraguay – Foreign Minister Eladio Ramón Loizaga Lezcano
- Papua New Guinea – Minister of State Puka Temu
- South Korea – Foreign Minister Yun Byung-se

=== 23 September ===
Morning schedule

- Albania – President Bujar Nishani
- Guinea – President Alpha Condé
- Niger – President Mahamadou Issoufou
- Central African Republic – President Faustin Archange Touadera
- Comoros – President Azali Assoumani
- Yemen – President Abdrabuh Mansour Hadi Mansour
- Haiti – Acting Head of State Jocelerme Privert
- Luxembourg – Prime Minister Xavier Bettel
- Moldova – Prime Minister Pavel Filip
- Samoa – Prime Minister Tuilaepa Sailele Malielegaoi
- Belgium – Prime Minister Charles Michel
- Mauritius – Prime Minister Anerood Jugnauth
- Russia – Foreign Minister Sergey Lavrov
- Armenia – Foreign Minister Eduard Nalbandyan
- Germany – Foreign Minister Frank-Walter Steinmeier
- North Korea – Foreign Minister Ri Yong Ho
- Hungary – Foreign Minister Péter Szijjártó
- Sweden – Foreign Minister Margot Wallström
- Morocco – Foreign Minister Salaheddine Mezouar

Afternoon schedule

- Mali – President Ibrahim Boubacar Keita
- Botswana – Vice-President Mokgweetsi Eric Keabetswe Masisi
- Indonesia – Vice-President Muhammad Jusuf Kalla
- South Sudan – Vice-President Taban Deng Gai
- Nicaragua – Vice-President Moises Omar Halleslevens Acevedo
- Laos – Prime Minister Thongloun Sisoulith
- Jamaica – Prime Minister Andrew Holness
- Solomon Islands – Prime Minister Manasseh Sogavare
- Lesotho – Prime Minister Pakalitha Bethuel Mosisili
- Andorra – Prime Minister Antoni Martí Petit
- Vanuatu – Prime Minister Charlot Salwai Tabimasmas
- Saint Vincent and the Grenadines – Prime Minister Ralph Gonsalves
- Tuvalu – Prime Minister Enele Sosene Sopoaga
- São Tomé and Príncipe – Prime Minister Patrice Emery Trovoada
- Venezuela – Foreign Minister Delcy Eloína Rodríguez Gómez
- Uzbekistan – Foreign Minister Abdulaziz Kamilov
- Ecuador – Foreign Minister Guillaume Long
- Azerbaijan – Foreign Minister Elmar Maharram oglu Mammadyarov
- Democratic Republic of the Congo – Foreign Minister Raymond Tshibanda N'tungamulongo
- Morocco – Foreign Minister Salaheddine Mezouar (Scheduled)

=== 24 September ===
Morning schedule

- Timor-Leste – Prime Minister Rui Maria de Araújo
- Saint Lucia – Prime Minister Allen Michael Chastanet
- Antigua and Barbuda – Prime Minister Gaston Alphonso Browne
- Saint Kitts and Nevis – Prime Minister Timothy Harris
- Swaziland – Prime Minister Barnabas Sibusiso Dlamini
- Tonga – Prime Minister Samiuela ‘Akilisi Pohiva
- Vietnam – Deputy Prime Minister Phạm Bình Minh
- Syria – Deputy Prime Minister Walid Al-Moualem
- Malaysia – Deputy Prime Minister Ahmad Zahid Hamidi
- San Marino – Foreign Minister Pasquale Valentini
- Liechtenstein – Foreign Minister Aurelia Frick
- Ireland – Foreign Minister Charles Flanagan
- Iceland – Foreign Minister Lilja Dögg Alfreðsdóttir
- Tajikistan – Foreign Minister Sirodjidin Aslov
- Nepal – Foreign Minister Prakash Sharan Mahat
- Congo – Foreign Minister Jean-Claude Gakosso
- Kyrgyzstan – Foreign Minister Erlan Abdyldayev
- Gabon – Foreign Minister Emmanuel Issoze-Ngondet
- Dominica – Foreign Minister Francine Baron

Afternoon schedule

- Philippines – Foreign Secretary Perfecto Yasay
- United Arab Emirates – Foreign Minister Sheikh Abdullah Bin Zayed Al Nahyan
- Sudan – Foreign Minister Ibrahim Ahmed Abd al-Aziz Ghandour
- Cambodia – Foreign Minister Prak Sokhonn
- Barbados – Foreign Minister Maxine Pamela Ometa McClean
- Burundi – Foreign Minister Alain Aimé Nyamitwe
- Somalia – Foreign Minister Abdusalam Hadliyeh Omer
- Maldives – Foreign Minister Mohamed Asim
- Bhutan – Foreign Minister Lyonpo Damcho Dorji
- Grenada – Foreign Minister Elvin Nimrod
- Mauritania – Foreign Minister Isselkou Ould Ahmed Izid Bih

=== 26 September ===
Morning schedule

- Oman – Foreign Minister Yousuf bin Alawi bin Abdallah
- Bahrain – Foreign Minister Shaikh Khalid Bin Ahmed Al-Khalifa
- India – Foreign Minister Sushma Swaraj
- Singapore – Foreign Minister Vivian Balakrishnan
- Cape Verde – Foreign Minister Luis Filipe Lopes Tavares
- Bahamas – Foreign Minister Frederick Mitchell
- Eritrea – Foreign Minister Osman Mohammed Saleh
- Belize – Foreign Minister Wilfred Elrington
- Trinidad and Tobago – Foreign Minister Denis Moses (Scheduled)
- Suriname – Foreign Minister Niermala Badrising
- Trinidad and Tobago – Foreign Minister Denis Moses
- Tanzania – Foreign Minister Augustine Phillip Mahiga
- Djibouti – Foreign Minister Mahmoud Ali Youssouf (Scheduled)
- Belarus – Deputy Foreign Minister Valentin Rybakov
- Palau – Permanent Representative Caleb Otto
- Seychelles – Permanent Representative Marie-Louise Potter
- Denmark – Permanent Representative Ib Petersen
- Djibouti – Foreign Minister Mahmoud Ali Youssouf (Scheduled)
- Togo – Permanent Representative Kokou Kpayedo
- Djibouti – Foreign Minister Mahmoud Ali Youssouf (Scheduled)
- United Nations – 71st Session of the United Nations General Assembly - President Peter Thomson (Closing statement)

==== Closing remarks ====
The Deputy Secretary General spoke on behalf of Ban-ki Moon, who was in Bogotá to celebrate the signing of a final peace deal between the government and FARC. He offered thanks to the delegation in describing the situation in the world from different perspectives. He also commended the work for preparing such a debate as the UN is the place to "take the temperature in the world" and there is a "pretty high temperature" but he saw hope because of member delegations sticking to the ideals of the UN Charter with regards to peace and security, development or human rights. "If we can be skillful and diligent, we can find international formulas are in the national interest of member states so as to cross the line between national and international. The Secretary General and I have appreciated the national goals and an historic achievement towards laying the foundations for international development. This is a remarkable chance to follow for member states of the world." With especially strong emphasis on climate change, there was a need to shift course for future generations of the planet. Further, the meeting on refugees and migration coloured the General Debate and the solidarity expressed with such people was to mobilise "around the xenophobia sometimes seen in the world [instead there was a] need to see the advantages of people moving even though there are challenges. In regards to the Syrian civil war, there is a need to move to stop the "horrific fighting and also the need to do the work the UN wants to do when the fighting subsides and then a chance to start a political process, which today looks pretty somber but we cannot lose the sight of it to stop the war." He commended the efforts of the UNGA and UNSC to "sustain peace and to prevent and reduce violence as well as post-conflict work." As a final point, he said: "Mr. President, to express on behalf of the Secretary General on his statement of his 10-year term, I've done half the time and understand the pressures thereof, especially on climate change. Thank you again for giving me the opportunity, Mr. President, to present the concluding remarks.

On behalf of the president who was participating in the signing of the peace deal in Colombia, he read a statement: The UNGA presents a portrait of the world. Over the past 6 days we have heard members on priorities and concerns. Leaders reaffirmed principles of the UN Charter and the central role of the UN in international cooperation and today's critical issues. In line with the 71st General Assembly theme, many support the principles to start with a movement of SDGs and tasked with the implementation of the SDGs...reiterate...SDGs curricula and all youth must know SDGs as inheritors of the agenda. I congratulate the Secretary General on the Paris climate agreement last week. We will see progress before COP 22 in Morocco to reduce emissions seen to reduce temperatures to pre-industrial levels." He mentioned a SDG conference to take place in June 2017. Further, the "New York declaration at last Monday's summit set trends to adopt global compacts and on refugees in 2018, also a result of climate change." He joined the Secretary General and members to condemn attack on an aid convoy in Aleppo and the need to find a solution, as did many states, to call for resumption of dialogue to resolve the Middle East conflict to reduce tensions. In relation to the UN own capacities to maintain peace, many recalled the concept of sustainable peace. He also called for increased women's participation on conflict resolution. Many delegations also highlighted the need for UN reform and disarmament, which would occur on the day's high-level plenary meeting on nuclear weapons at UN headquarters. In human rights, members states also renewed calls as such on the empowerment of women and girls, as well a continuation of the need to tackle all forms of discrimination. Last week, final statement by Moon was a testament to his work in the last nine years and his successor's challenge. "This is a matter I will manage with great care in the coming months. Ladies and gentlemen, this is but a synopsis on many issues over the past eight days. It demonstrates the unique nature of the General Debate. [We must] renew collective energy for debate and decorum." There was also a need for an ad hoc group on the revitalisation of the UNGA: "To conclude, excellences, appreciation to all staff (others such as UN translators, security, etc). I look forward to represent all of you with the best of my ability during the 71st session. I end the statement of 71st UNGA president."

==== Right of Reply ====
The delegate of the Solomon Islands responded to the statement by Indonesia on 24 September in regards to human rights violations of the Melanesian peoples in West Papua. Indonesia has ratified the convention on torture in 1998 but has to date not harmonised its law to include the agreed definition of torture or to punish and criminalise said torture. "The Solomon Islands receives documents from leaders and civil society in regards to human rights [violations] in West Papua. Thus the Solomon Islands invites Indonesia to substantiate that with five others Pacific islands states' fabricated reports and to visit Papua and West Papua with concerns on the loss of life at the hands of Indonesian authorities. [We] accept that lives are lost in mistakes, but how. in body of human rights, can we turn a blind eye to the deaths of thousands of West Papuans. As an island in a region that Indonesia claims to be a part of, Solomon Islands cannot stand by on atrocities taking place. [We have a] moral and ethical duty to bring the unfortunate reality of the lives of Melanesian, be it in West Papua or any other place [and] to bring accountability to those rights [violations]. The declaration of rights stipulates that all have a right to the security of persons and has binding legal instruments on Indonesia, [such as] Article 3's protection against crimes of human right violations. As with the case of the five other Pacific island countries mentioned by Indonesia (including Palau it becomes six states), we cannot resolve this matter alone so we highlight the challenges at this august body. We realise that neither we nor Indonesia can resolve the matter alone. It needs to be brought to a body of UN and done so urgently as lives are being lost. Mr. President, all lives matter. The Solomon Islands reiterates its willingness for constructive dialogue with Indonesia, as have all regional Pacific island states expressed a need for dialogue over human rights violations since the last 20 years. A lack of will to engage from Indonesia will not dampen the will of the Solomon Islands and the six other countries. We understand through true constructive dialogue can we realise the Charter. In closing, we welcome the opportunity to highlight this case to this august body so we, and as family of nations, can address the human rights violations and loss of lives to prevent a further loss of lives.

Pakistan replied to the statement by India earlier in the day in saying that it was a "litany of falsehoods against my country and reflects the deep hostility of her government to Pakistan. We reject the baseless allegations that seek to deflect attention from the over 500,000 occupation forces against the people of Jammu and Kashmir. In the last two and a half months, over 100 Kashmiris have been killed and hundreds more injured. This is the worst form of state terrorism. A war crime India perpetrates in Jammu and Kashmir. Pakistan demands an investigation and asks India to accept an investigation by the UN high commission for human rights. Jammu and Kashmir cannot and never has been a part of India in accordance with several resolutions of the UNSC. For 70 years India has prevented Kashmiris from holding a plebiscite to determine their destiny. The struggle of Kashmiris has a right to receive support. The attack in Uri [bears the hallmarks of] timing to divert attention from the international community with activities such initiated to use as a propaganda objective. India is using the attack against Pakistan because warmongering is likely to be isolated and it cannot isolate others. India is a lone practitioner of state terrorism. India has perpetrated aggression on all its neighbours in order to do its bidding and support subversion in various parts of my country. Kulbhushan Jadhav has confessed to Indian activities in Balochistan and the Federally Administered Tribal Areas. Indeed Kulbhushan reported support for groups listed under the UN sanctions regime. India's attempts to destabilise Balochistan are now known...to address India's own problems with a dozen or so insurgencies in its own country. India's claims to want to talk with Pakistan [yet] India suspended talks and refuses to reactivate them. The latest offer of talks was made by the prime minister of Pakistan from this rostrum. Talk are not in the interest of Pakistan but the interest of both countries and its people. Pakistan is willing for serious and result oriented talks and to resolve the Kashmir dispute."

India then replied to Pakistan in saying that the comment was "another attempt to divert attention from the country's support for terrorism. It made a fanciful misrepresentation of Jammu and Kashmir and did not attempt to answer the questions posed repeatedly by the international community. How do terror sanctuaries flourish despite the Pakistan Army's much vaunted anti-terror activities and despite international aid? Can Pakistan confirm they do not use proxies to export terror as a state policy? Can they confirm its territory has not used been for attacks against India? Can Pakistan give assurances at the highest level? What we have heard today is a dysfunctional state which hurls atrocities on its own. Will the representative of Pakistan deny its armed forces committed the most heinous genocides in 1971? Will the representative deny the use of artillery against his own people? Will the representative explain why civil society is being silenced by a plethora of heavily armed groups such as Jaish-e-Mohammed, Lashkar-e-Taiba and Harkat-ul-Mujahideen? As Jaish, Lashkar and Harkat all mean 'army.' To quote the foreign secretary "Jammu and Kasmir is an integral part of India." I hope this message is clear.

Guatemala responded to Belize in reference to the territorial dispute and "facts that recently occurred to the 150-year-old conflict. [We are in] disbelief over the delegation of Belize on [an] untrue statement. We reiterate our determination for a peaceful resolution by the ICJ. As President Jimmy Morales said, [we] aspire to a privileged relationship and an ongoing dialogue to resolve the current problems. As founding member of this body, [we] never resorted to use or threat of force. We sought peaceful means on justice and international law to territorial disputes. For over 120-years Guatemala has done the impossible to seek a mutually beneficial solution by direct negotiations and good offices but [our] good faith has been taken advantage when a colonising power unilaterally granted independence in 1981 but Guatemala recognised the legitimacy of independence [yet] maintains a right to its territory. Rights taken by an invasion force and [through] deceit, [we] have never violated against a brother country...today we see an other violence, an abject conduct that violates the first articles of the UN Charter to peaceful settlement of maritime dispute. Also as in Article 2, the last decade has still made victims of defenceless Guatemalan farmers whose only mistake is to be under Belizean jurisdiction. This provocation is unjustifiable and a moral aberration that endangers international peace...such violent deaths have always gone unpunished. The [most recent] victim was 14-years-old [and died] at the hands of a militia under the so-called defence forces of Belize. Violence undermines and avoids harmonious relations that are mutually benefitable. In regards to Belizean references to experts, it does not justify such Belizean behavior...led to the death of the boy...by the Belizean army as part of a joint patrol with the militia and army. We reject the report due to inconsistencies in the report and no documentation to back up the arguments. The events of 20 April are not conclusive...and to say Guatemalan armed forces entered Belize (inaudible)...Belize did not guard the crime scene, as it is the responsibility of Belize within territory under its control, that compromised the results of investigation. Six shots were fired in the back and three in the back of the neck that led to the death of the boy. None of 10 dead deserved it. A policeman died in 2014 in the Caracol area but those entering Belize from Guatemala does not mean they are citizens of Guatemala. Facts still need to be investigated. Guatemala has been patient and shown conciliatory attitudes for 110 years to deal with threats of imperialist power [such as] those who want to appear as victims when oppressors. There is no justification for force and lethal use of weapons. We regret that for the first time we had to use this forum to condemn such behavior. There is a pressing need to find common problems to solutions, [we] will not back down to find a just solution. We will never abandon our citizens and privilege to live in harmony. We [must] submit to referendum, nay to an international court.

Iran responded to a few comments, starting with the U.A.E. "The foreign minister, on Saturday [24 September] reported baseless and absurd fabrications. The same accusations were also levelled by same other U.A.E. officials on other occasions but with no substantiations to support them. These are flatly wrong and that no recommendations made them credible. On the contrary, its repulsive and hypocritical on a country whose jet fighters are bombing Saudi-led intervention in Yemen when accusing Iran of interference in domestic affairs of other countries. It is farcical [when we] a regime who has exported extremist taqfiri ideologies in Syria, Lebanon and other places to destabilise the region. Officials have insulted Iran's integrity with claims to the Persian Gulf Islands. (Note: Iran is in a dispute with the United Arab Emirates over the sovereignty of Abu Musa and the Greater and Lesser Tunbs.) We reject the claim [as the] islands are a part of Iran. No claim, no matter the repetition, will not dent it in any way. Moreover, taking Israeli representatives' statement we realise they are in line with the Israeli statement. With alignment with Israeli and regional regimes, in light of the U.A.E. statement, is not a coincidence. It shows how the respective regimes come together and its Persian Gulf allies are working with the Israelis and are tantamount to betraying the Palestinian people. In reference to the JCPOA...[we] know its partners tried to impede the road to a bill. After the fruition of the JCPOA, [there have been] escalated provocations on Iran...[we] regret the work to deescalate is not reciprocated by the others."

Iran also reacted to claim by Bahrain as "false" in alleging "Iranian intervention in Bahrain's domestic affairs. It is an obvious lie. The BICI set up by the [Bahraini] government reads '[the] evidence presented to the commission by the government on the involvement by Iran in the internal affairs of Bahrain does not establish a discernible link between a specific event in Bahrain.' Also in reference to the Mina disaster and to criticise Iran is rejected. [Over 500] Iranian pilgrims died...we [call] to the Saudis to accept responsibility...[and a] thorough[ly] transparent and independent investigation is done so representatives of related countries can participate and [does not] fall on deaf ears. Effective action [should be] taken to redress a solution." The representative noted that "further, a wrong term for the Persian Gulf was used. [We] remind [you] that this term has been used from 500 years before Christ. [It s also] the international term used by the international community, including the UN." He closed his statement in saying that "last[ly, we] always endeavoured to the removal of tension in the region and seek good neighbourly relations, including with Persian Gulf countries and call for a dialogue to dispel misunderstanding and restore friendly relations that our peoples mostly enjoyed through history.

Indonesia responded in using it second reply. It said that the "use of allegations of human rights [abuse] to support separatist movements violated [the] principles of the UN Charter by blatantly violating the internal affairs and the sovereign and territorial integrity of other nations [sic]. It shows ignorance of reality on the ground and trash misinformation by separatist groups.

Pakistan used its second reply to respond to India. It said that India "resort[ed] to falsehood and fabrications. [We] reject it and irrespective of repetitive lies cannot replace truth. [It is] just propaganda. Facts have not changed that Jammu and Kashmir is internationally disputed and Indian state sponsored terrorism continues in Jammu and Kashmir and decimates human rights against the hapless Kashmiris. India's sabotage is well documented [and that] Pakistan fight against terrorism is known internationally. [Meanwhile,] the voice of the Kashmiris is not recognized [with their] 70-year cry for independence.

India used its second reply for the day against Pakistan in saying that it has "patiently listened to [my] colleague from Pakistan [who had] yet stayed silent on the tough questions. [We have] come to expect: deception, deceit and denial. The world awaits their response.

The president "conclude[d] item agenda 8." Following which the meeting was shortly adjourned.

== See also ==
- List of UN General Assembly sessions
- List of General debates of the United Nations General Assembly
