= Fiji and the United Nations =

Republic of Fiji

United Nations membership
- Membership: Full member
- Since: October 13, 1970
- UNSC seat: Non-permanent
- Ambassador: Satyendra Prasad

Fiji established its Permanent Mission to the United Nations on 13 October 1970, three days after obtaining its independence from the United Kingdom. Since then, Fiji's participation in the United Nations has been notable primarily for its active role in UN peacekeeping operations, which began in 1978.

== History ==
On October 13, 1970. Fiji was admitted as the 127th member of the United Nations.

Fiji begins its UN peacekeeping legacy on June 10, 1978 by deploying its first infantry battalion FijiBatt 1 to the UN Interim Force in Lebanon (UNIFIL). Secretary-General Javier Perez de Cuellar expressed concern over the crisis, marking the beginning of complex UN diplomatic monitoring of Fiji's internal governance.

On April 1996, the Fijian UNIFIL headquarters in Qana, was hit by Israeli artillery during Operation Grapes of Wrath, which ended in the deaths of 100 civilians sheltering there and injuring several Fijian peacekeepers. Fijian troops concluded UNIFIL mission on the 22th of December, 2018.

== List of ambassadors ==
The following individuals have held office as Ambassador of Fiji to the United Nations.

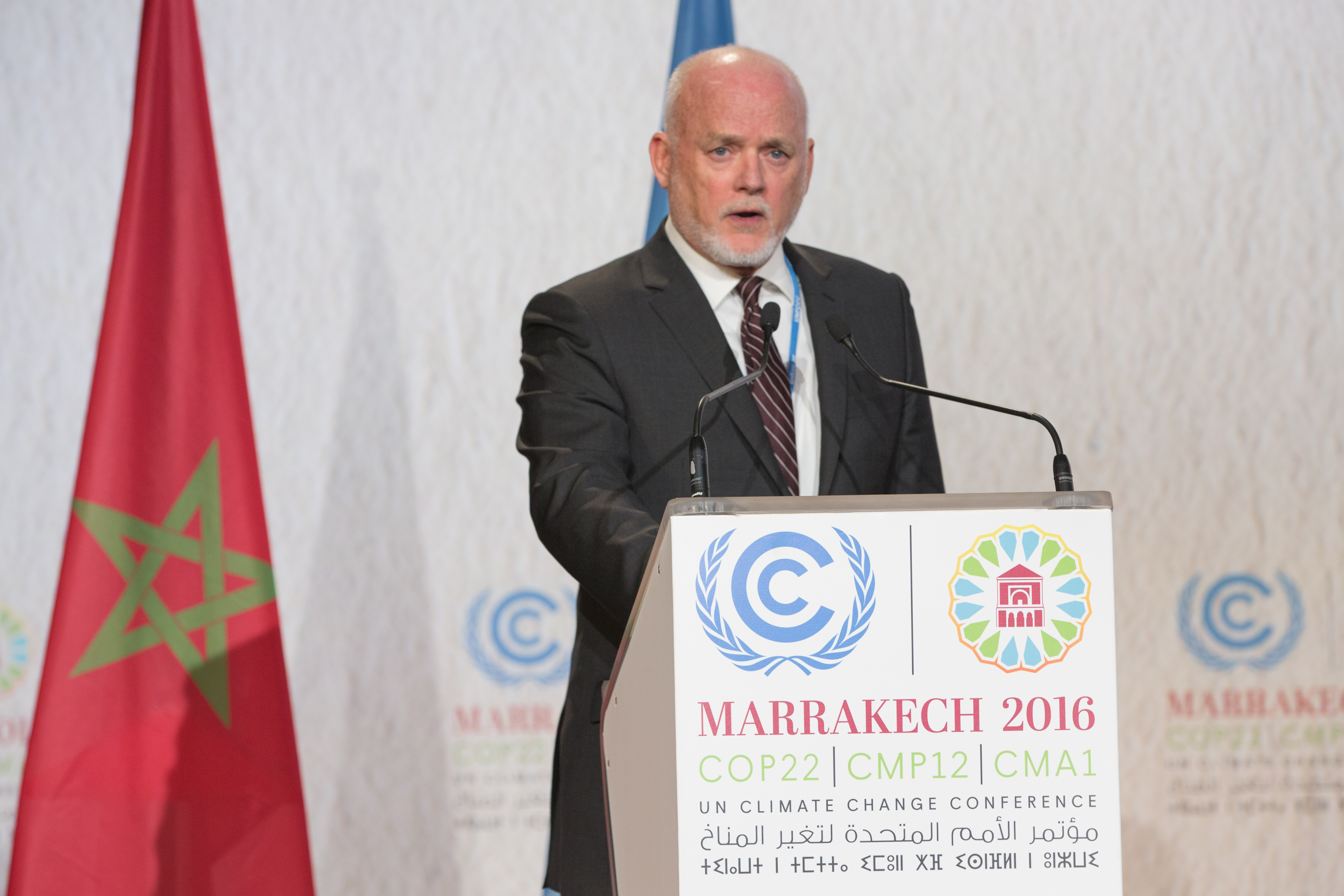
Fijian diplomat Peter Thomson speaking as President of the United Nations General Assembly at the 2016 United Nations Climate Change Conference in Marrakesh

Order	Ambassador	Term of office
1.	Semesa Sikivou	1970–1976
2.	Berenado Vunibobo	1976–1980
3.	Filipe Bole	1980–1983
4.	Ratu Jone Radrodro	1983–1985
5.	Winston Thompson	1985–1991
6.	Ratu Manasa Seniloli	1991–1995
7.	Poseci Bune	1996–1999
8.	Amraiya Naidu	1999–2003
9.	Isikia Savua	2003–2008
10.	Berenado Vunibobo	2008–2010
11.	Peter Thomson	2010–2016
12.	Luke Daunivalu	2016-2018
13.	Satyendra Prasad	2018–present

== Peacekeeping ==
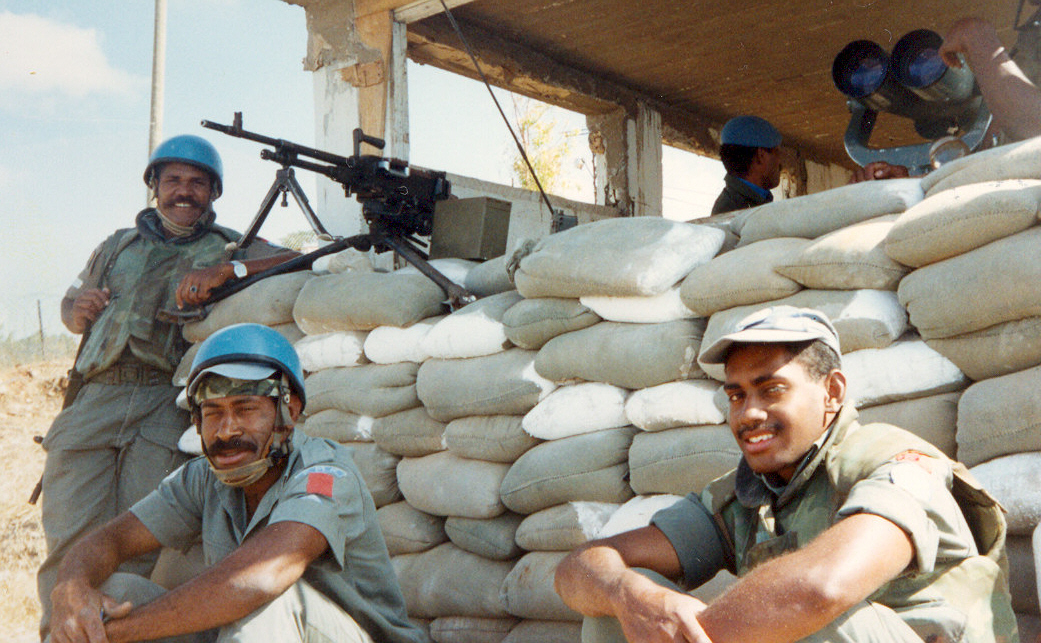
Fijian soldiers of the United Nations Interim Force in Lebanon in 1989.

Fiji soldiers served in the United Nations Interim Force in Lebanon, which Fiji's Major General George Konrote commanded in 1998 and 1999.

The country has also contributed to other operations including Kosovo and Sinai, and, in 2004, Fiji was the first country to volunteer troops to protect United Nations officials in Iraq. The BBC has remarked on Fiji's "long and proud history of sending its forces to the world's trouble-spots". As of September 2004, 35 Fiji soldiers had been killed in the line of duty while serving on UN peacekeeping missions.

As of April 2007, Fiji had 292 soldiers, police officers and military observers serving in United Nations peacekeeping operations in Iraq, Liberia, Sudan and Timor-Leste. Following the military coup in Fiji in December 2006, New Zealand and Australia urged the United Nations to suspend Fiji's participation in peacekeeping operations, at first to little avail. Questioned by media, a spokesman for the office of the Secretary-General stated that "[t]he United Nations is grateful for the service provided by Fijian personnel to UN peacekeeping operations over many years and for the Fijian personnel currently serving in dangerous UN assignments, including in Iraq".

Fiji's military leader and interim Prime Minister Voreqe Bainimarama underlined his country's "proud track record in UN peacekeeping operations of professionalism, discipline, compassion and ability, training and ethics". In September 2008, Fiji's participation in peacekeeping operations has reportedly been suspended. In April 2009, however, United Nations peacekeeping missions were still employing 282 Fijian troops, military observers or police, a fact criticised by New Zealand Foreign Minister Murray McCully.

Following lobbying from New Zealand and Australia, the United Nations announced that it would "continue to use Fijian police and soldiers in its current peacekeeping missions, but [would] not increase their numbers in future deployments". In March 2010, this led newly appointed Fiji Ambassador Peter Thomson to approach U.N. Secretary General Ban Ki-moon to express Fiji's readiness and wish to commit further troops to U.N. peacekeeping operations. As of June 2010, "Fiji troops are [...] the only UN blue helmets in Iraq since 2004 with a 221 strong contingent".

== Climate change ==
Issues emphasised by Fiji at the United Nations in recent years have included the effect of climate change, notably on Small Island Developing States. Addressing the United Nations General Assembly in September 2008, Prime Minister Commodore Voreqe Bainimarama stated:

"On the issue of Climate Change, Fiji looks to, and is relying, on your leadership. This is a very critical issue for the very small island and atoll nations in the Pacific. While the rest of the World continues to endlessly debate the implications of climate change, in the very small islands and atolls in the Pacific, the problem is very much upon us; it is now a present and very real danger. It poses a serious risk to regional stability and security. I appeal to the international community, and its system of institutions, to enhance efforts to assist us address (sic) the threat of global climate change. We need investments in adaptation measures. We need to move from rhetoric to a more pragmatic and speedy response. We call upon the agencies, and our regional partners, to coordinate efforts to ensure that we in the Pacific region have the capacity, both human and institutional, to deal with this new threat, especially as it is getting stronger. The observed and potential impacts on our people and ecosystems, due to climate change, are all too real and immediate." (bolded in original)

Addressing the Assembly ten years later in September 2018, after Fiji had presided over the 2017 United Nations Climate Change Conference, he stated:

"Madame President, Fiji is coming to the end of its presidency of COP23, of the United Nations' ongoing climate negotiations among the nations of the world, but the struggle to fight global warming and to end the degradation of our oceans will continue to be Fiji’s highest priority. The many disastrous effects of climate change that we are seeing in the South Pacific or around the world are well-documented. The same can be said of the enormous stresses on our oceans arising from acidification, overfishing, warming and plastic refuse. The time to debate those facts is long past.
As the Fijian Prime Minister, I meet thousands of Fijian women, men and children every year who have suffered from the latest wave of climate-related impacts; the cyclones, the flooding, the prolonged droughts, and the steadily rising seas. I meet with the farmers whose crops have been washed away, the teachers and students who have lost their schools and the families whose homes have been destroyed. They want their Prime Minister to demand that the world take action on their behalf.
The commitments we have all made through our Nationally Determined Contributions or NDCs fall woefully short of the mark. They simply will not get us to the goal of the Paris Agreement of reducing the rate of global warming to well below 2 degrees Celsius target —let alone the more ambitious target of 1.5 degrees. What matters now, Madame President, is action. Fiji will press for more action on climate change and ocean health in every forum that we are a part of."

== Leadership ==
Under Frank Bainimarama's premiership, Fiji has sought to assume a more active and prominent role on international affairs, notably through the United Nations. In 2011, Fiji briefly sought election to the United Nations Security Council, which would have made it the first developing Pacific Island state to do so, but subsequently withdrew its candidacy. In 2013 Fiji presided over the Group of 77, an association of 134 developing countries working together for their common interests at the United Nations. Fiji was the first small island developing state to preside over the G77, and Foreign Affairs Minister Ratu Inoke Kubuabola explained: "[R]ecently, the G77 has taken on negotiating positions in areas of climate change and sustainable development, the two areas which PSIDS focus on in New York. These are the two areas Fiji wishes to place emphasis on to ensure that the interests of all developing countries, including those of PSIDS, are effectively addressed".

In 2016, Fijian diplomat Peter Thomson was elected President of the Seventy-first session of the United Nations General Assembly, becoming the first Pacific Islander to hold the post. He told the General Assembly: "We bring special perspectives on climate change and on oceans issues and you can expect me to be vocal on those in the 71st session". Fiji presided the 2017 United Nations Climate Change Conference (COP23), which took place in Bonn for practical reasons but under Fijian leadership. Under Fiji's impetus, it launched the "Talanoa Dialogue" to facilitate the implementation of efforts to reduce the emissions of greenhouse gases.

In 2018, Fiji became the first Pacific Island country to be elected to the United Nations Human Rights Council. Fiji's Attorney-General Aiyaz Sayed-Khaiyum emphasised Fiji's commitment to promoting "the right to education, healthcare, equal justice, adequate food, clean water, decent housing and many other fundamental rights for human progress and dignity".

== 2010–11 voting record ==
Fiji voted in favour of

- Resolution 65/454 (2010), on a follow-up to the Durban Declaration and Programme of Action (adopted 104 to 22)
- Resolution 65/202 (2010), on the right of the Palestinian people to self-determination (adopted by 177 to 6)
- Resolution 65/225 (2010), on the situation of human rights in the Democratic People’s Republic of Korea (adopted by 106 to 20)
- Resolution 65/L.78 (2011), on a review of the Human Rights Council (adopted 154 to 4)

Fiji abstained from voting on

- Resolution 65/456/Add.3 (2010), on the situation of human rights in Myanmar (adopted by 85 to 26)
- Resolution 65/L.53 (2010), on a moratorium on the use of the death penalty (adopted by 109 to 41)
- Resolution 65/226 (2010), on the situation of human rights in the Islamic Republic of Iran (adopted by 78 to 45)

Fiji voted against

- Resolution 65/224 (2010), on combating defamation of religions (adopted by 79 to 67)
