= Natabua High School =

Coordinates: 17.6107°S 177.4561°E

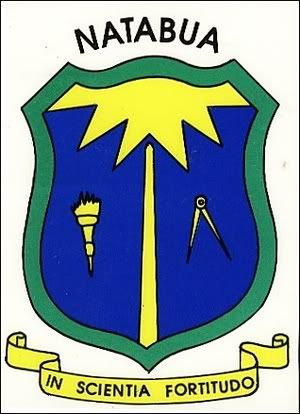

Location
- Drasa Avenue, Lautoka, Fiji; Lautoka, Western Division; Fiji

Information
- Type: Secondary School
- Motto: In Scientia Fortitudo
- Founded: 1930
- Principal: Virendra Sharma (2015 - )
- Staff: 63
- Grades: Year 9 - Year 13
- Enrollment: 1529
- Colours: Blue, White, Green and Gold Attire (Males) : Standard White shirt, Pocket Sulu Attire (Females): Standard Dress
- Team name: Blues
- National ranking: 1st
- Newspaper: Nat News
- Yearbook: Tatler
- Information: natoffice@connect.com.fj
- Website: Natabua High School

Natabua High School is a co-educational school based in Lautoka, Fiji. It is one of the biggest schools in the Pacific with a total student number of 1200.

The school was founded in 1930 as a boarding school for boys and was moved to its present location in 1960.

== Students ==
There are more than 1200 students, in Year 9 to Year 13, led by the Head Boy and Head Girl under the Student Council. The school hostel provides accommodation for residents who join the school from rural and maritime locations and international communities from around the Pacific. The school hostel body is led by its own Hostel Head Boy, who is assisted by Deputy Heads that help to see its residents follow and maintain the rules of the school and the hostel.

The hostel students are colloquially known as the Lonehats which is an acronym for Living on Natabua Excels A Holistic Approach Towards School. A majority of its residents join the school from Year 9 and leave in Year 13, upon the completion of the last paper in the Fiji Year 13 Certificate Examination at the end of the year.

== Cadet Corp Programme ==
Natabua was one of the first schools in the country to start the Schools Cadet Corp. The Cadet Corp program is undertaken by the school in collaboration with members of the Republic of the Fiji Military Forces, who conduct instructional sessions on cadet drills and assist the school in the incorporation of word and visual formations on the ground during the day of the Annual Passout Parade. The school initiated the cadet-formation segment for the first time in 2015, to commemorate the historic win by the school in the Coca Cola Games that year. Over the years, it has formed other words and visual material from 2015 till 2019. The 2020 Review was not held because of health restrictions related to COVID-19.

=== Cadet parade formations ===
The scope and concept of the cadet formations take into account various events of educational, national and global significance which are done to bring awareness or garner support from the many spectators who make the annual pilgrimage to the school to view the cadet passout parade.

small	small	small	small	small	small
==== FRIDAY, JULY 21, 2017 ==== The formation shows the words YET HIGHER, which was the school theme for the parade that year. The words "COP 23" are made in reference to Fiji holding the presidency of COP 23, the 23rd climate conference held in Bonn, Germany.	==== Friday, JULY 20, 2018 ==== A coconut tree inside a rugby ball representing Fiji rugby with the words "RWC 7S, GO FIJI" were formed with the numbers 97 and 05 with 18 in Roman numerals - symbolizing the years Fiji won the coveted Melrose Cup of the RWC 7s in 1997 and 2005, and the school's show of support for the Fiji Airways men's seven's team at the Rugby World Cup Sevens in San Francisco, California, USA that year.	==== FRIDAY, JULY 19, 2019 ==== Peace and progress, the theme of the year's parade are formed at the top, followed by a hand making the universal symbol of peace and the peace sign in its palm. The numbers 6 and 7 are the jersey numbers of Ratu Meli Derenalagi and Vilimone Botitu, whose surnames are also formed on the ground. The two rugby sevens players were former scholars of the school and are now professional rugby players.	==== FRIDAY, SEPTEMBER 30, 2022 ==== A formation of three spirals, symbolising constant growth and change is depicted, with the words NAT for Natabua and the numbers 22 for the year 2022 were formed, illustrating the resurgence of normalcy and the start of change following the COVID-19 pandemic, which halted passout parades from 2020-2021.	==== FRIDAY, AUGUST 4, 2023 ==== A heart with the words NAT for Natabua is held by two cradling hands, signifying the parade's theme of that year being love, peace and progress. The numbers 20 and 23 are representative of the cadet year.	==== FRIDAY, AUGUST 2, 2024 ==== The school expressed its support for the Fiji contingent to the 2024 Paris Olympics, particularly the men's rugby sevens team in the hopes of defending their gold medal for a third time, which was not the case as they settled for silver, with France scooping gold. The five Olympic rings envelope the phrase NAT, GO FIJI, due to the Paris Olympics in France. Meanwhile, 70 and YEARS represent the 70th year of the cadet programme in Natabua High School.

- 2015:COKES 2015
- 2016:BULA CMDR SIR (Welcoming its Chief Guest, Rear Admiral Viliame Naupoto, Commander of the RFMF)
- 2017: YET HIGHER, COP 23 with wave formations by rifle platoons and junior non-rifle platoons (Fiji assuming presidency of COP 23 in 2017.
- 2018:RWC 7S, 97, 05, XVIII, GO FIJI GO with 18 in Roman numerals formed by the School Brass Band and the coconut tree in the Fiji Rugby Union logo formed by rifle platoons.
- 2019: DERENALAGI, BOTITU, 6, 7, PEACE, PROGRESS with a hand formation ☮️ (Fiji 7s Men's players Meli Derenalagi and Vilimoni Botitu, alumni of the school) and the numbers 6 + 7 as their jersey numbers
- 2022: NAT, UNIVERSAL SIGN OF STRENGTH AND RESILIENCE, 22 (Strength and Resilience was the core theme of the school being able to be resilient after 2 years of not cadet pass out.)
- 2023: 20, 23 with NAT in a heart being held by cradling palms. A depiction of the parade's theme being love, tolerance and respect.
- 2024: The school celebrated 70 years of cadets and showed their support for Fiji at the 2024 Paris Olympics.

== Sports and extra-curricular activities ==
Natabua has participated in sports ranging from indoor sports such as badminton, tennis, handball and table tennis to contact sports including rugby union, rugby league, netball, futsal, soccer and athletics.

In April 2015, Natabua became the first western school to win the boys division of the Coca Cola Games, which is the largest secondary school athletics competition in Fiji.

== Coca Cola Games ==
The historic win in the 2015 Fiji Finals was a significant victory not only for Natabua, but for the Western Division as a whole, with its female athletic counterparts Jasper Williams High School - collecting another win in the Girls Division as well. There was a city-wide celebration in Lautoka, and appearances by old scholars as well as political and sporting figures. However, in the following year, Natabua did not attain the win in the boys division.

In April 2017, Natabua High School won the Coca Cola Games in the boys division for the second time. The win was the result of athlete Shane Tuvusa's unexpected finish when his 4X400M first place finish, resulted in the win for Natabua. The competition during this particular race was the result of an intense battle between Natabua High School, Queen Victoria School and Ratu Kadavulevu School - three schools that all needed just one gold medal to claim the boys title.

== 2020: 90th anniversary and COVID-19 ==
The year 2020 was the 90th year of the school's existence, but the COVID-19 pandemic having entered the country and the increasing health regulations put in place to safeguard lives and minimise any new cases, halted any significant displays of celebration - particularly in the Annual Cadet Corp Review Passout Parade, which was to be held in July 2020.

Despite the increased restrictions, the school was reopened for classes and students and teachers continued with face to face classes, after it was announced by the Fijian Prime Minister that the country had been COVID-contained.

== Notable alumni ==
- George Konrote – President of Fiji (12 November 2015 – 11 November 2021)
- Satendra Nandan – Academic, Writer and former Politician.
- Peter Thomson – 71st President of the United Nations General Assembly
- Apisai Naikatini – Fijian rugby player
- Iliesa Tanivula – Highlanders and Blues Rugby player, former Fiji 7's coach
- Makelesi Bulikiobo – National Sprint-Queen who won the 200m event at the 2007 South Pacific Games.
- Vienna Kumar – Fijian tennis player
- Maleli Kunavore – Fijian rugby union player
- Semi Valemei – Fijian rugby league player
- Meli Derenalagi - Fijian rugby player & Olympic Gold medalist
- Vilimoni Botitu - Fijian rugby player & Olympic Gold medalist
- Sashi Kiran - Minister for Women, Children and Social Protection
- Josaia Tavaiqia Chiefly title of Tui Vuda and Vice-President of Fiji (1990-1997)
