= 2016 United Nations General Assembly presidential election =

United Nations General Assembly presidential election, 2016
- 13 June 2016
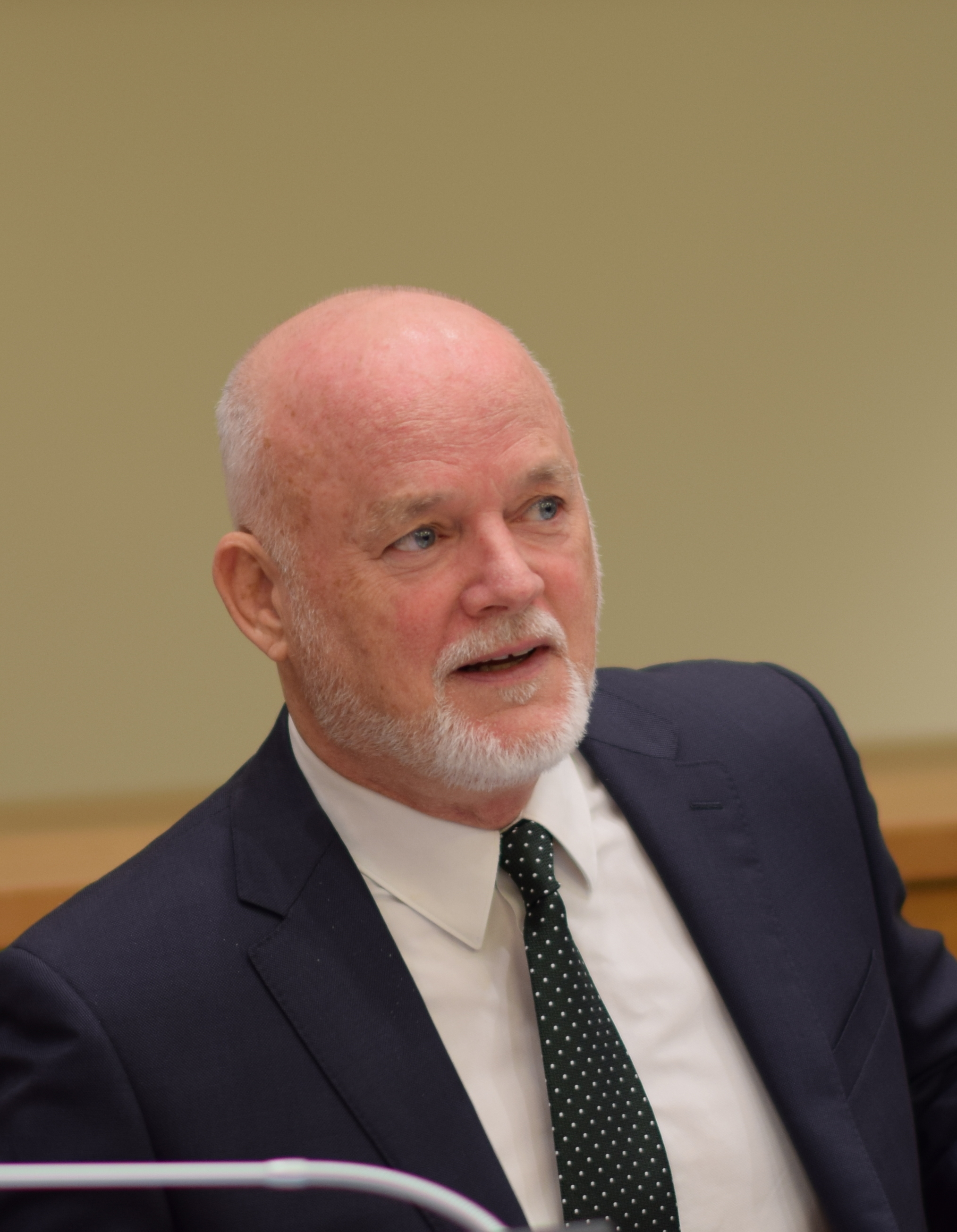
| Nominee | (Fiji) Peter Thomson | (Cyprus) Andreas Mavroyiannis |
| Party | Independent | Independent |
| Popular vote | 94 | 90 |
President before election
(Denmark) Mogens Lykketoft
Social Democrats
President-elect
(Fiji) Peter Thomson
Independent

An indirect presidential election was held to choose the President of the United Nations General Assembly on 13 June 2016 to replace Mogens Lykketoft and preside over the Seventy-first session of the United Nations General Assembly. It was the rotational turn of the Asia-Pacific Group to preside over the session. Peter Thomson was elected with 94 votes for and 90 votes against. This was the first time since 2012 that there was no consensus candidate from the regional groupings, thus invoking a secret ballot vote. His tenure began on 13 September 2016 and ended on 12 September 2017.

== Background ==
Though there is usually a consensus candidate from the rotational group which is scheduled to hold the post of president of the United Nations General Assembly, if there is no consensus candidate then a vote is held by secret ballot amongst the entire United Nations General Assembly.

The election takes added import as it occurs in a year of the United Nations Secretary-General election.

=== Electorate ===
The Asia-Pacific Group is the second-largest of the UN regional groups with 53 members who are informally entitled to choose a candidate from within their group.

== Candidates ==
Fiji's ran its former ambassador as a candidate. Peter Thomson had previously sought citizenship in Australia and New Zealand after a coup in his country but was later re-issued citizenship with a new law and took up the diplomatic posts.

Cyprus nominated Andreas Mavroyiannis as a candidate. He had previously served as negotiator for talks over the Cyprus conflict and was also ambassador to the UN.

== Election ==
Thomson won narrowly over Mavroyiannis by a vote of 94 to 90 member states, with nine abstentions.
