= Isikia Savua =

Fijian diplomat (1952–2011)

Isikia Rabici Savua (31 March 1952 – 30 May 2011) was a senior Fijian diplomat who had a distinguished career in the military and police forces before taking up his last post as Ambassador and Permanent Representative to the United Nations on 4 March 2003.

== Career ==
Savua spent 18 years in the Fijian army, which he joined on leaving high school in 1971. When he retired from military service in 1988, he had attained the rank of lieutenant colonel.

The following four years (1988–1992) were spent in the Fiji Diplomatic Corps, first as counsellor (political) to the Fiji Mission to the United Nations, and then (for six months) as consul general to Sydney, Australia.

In 1992, Savua joined the Fiji Police Force as deputy commissioner, the second highest position in the force. A year later, he was promoted to the post of commissioner. He was to hold this top office until 2002.

== Coup controversy ==
The Fiji coup of 2000, in which saw the fall of the government of Prime Minister Mahendra Chaudhry and President Ratu Sir Kamisese Mara, took place during Savua's tenure as Police Commissioner. In an interview with Fiji Television on 29 April 2001, his last media appearance before being incapacitated by a stroke, Mara accused Savua of having been a party to the planning of the coup. This allegation was later repeated on 22 October 2004 under parliamentary privilege by Senator Adi Koila Nailatikau, Mara's daughter, who condemned his appointment as an Ambassador while still under investigation for alleged coup-related offences. Savua was not charged with any crime, and while alive denied the allegations.

== Personal life ==
Savua hailed from the village of Tobu in the district of Nakorotubu, in Ra Province, and was married to Frances, with whom he had two sons, Daniel and Josefa.

== Death ==
Savua died on 30 May 2011 and was cremated on 3 June.
