= Seventy-first session of the United Nations General Assembly =

71st United Nations General Assembly

- 13 September 2016 – 12 September 2017 71st session 71st general debate
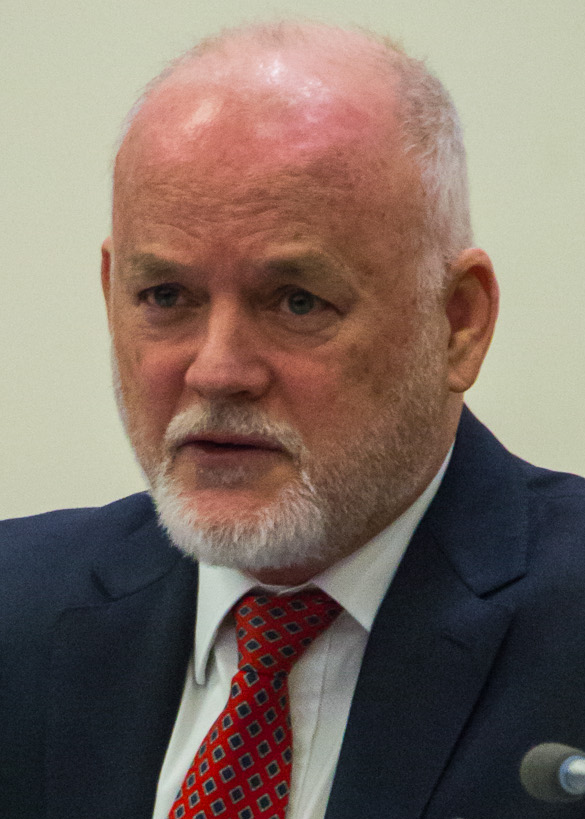
- President of the 71st General Assembly; Peter Thomson
- Host country: United Nations
- Cities: New York City
- Venues: General Assembly Hall at the United Nations Headquarters
- Participants: Member states of the United Nations
- Secretary-General: Ban Ki-moon
- Website: www.un.org/en/ga/

The seventy-first session of the United Nations General Assembly opened on 13 September 2016. The president of the United Nations General Assembly is from the Asia-Pacific Group.

== Organisation for the session ==
Fijian Ambassador Peter Thomson was chosen over Cypriot Andreas Mavroyiannis to preside over the assembly in a year that includes the election of a new secretary-general of the United Nations. Fiji's Foreign Minister Ratu Inoke Kubuabola that the country sought a platform to achieve sustainable development that would be called the Triennial UN Conferences on Oceans and Seas.

As is tradition during each session of the General Assembly, Secretary-General Ban Ki-moon drew lots to see which member state would take the helm at the first seat in the General Assembly Chamber, with the other member states following according to the English translation of their name, the same order would be followed in the six main committees.

The Chairmen and officers of the General Assembly's six Main Committees were also elected: First Committee (Disarmament and International Security Committee); Second Committee (Economic and Financial Committee); Third Committee (Social, Humanitarian and Cultural Committee); Fourth Committee (Special Political and Decolonization Committee); Fifth Committee (Administrative and Budgetary Committee); and the Sixth Committee (Legal Committee).

There were also nineteen vice-presidents of the UNGA. Nepal was one of them from the Asia-Pacific Group.

=== General Debate ===
Most states had a representative speaking about issues concerning their country and the hopes for the coming year as to what the UNGA would do. This was an opportunity for the member states to opine on international issues of their concern. The General Debate occurred from September–October, with the exception of the intervening Sunday.

The order of speakers was given first to member states, then observer states and supranational bodies. Any other observers entities had a chance to speak at the end of the debate, if they so chose. Speakers were put on the list in the order of their request, with special consideration for ministers and other government officials of similar or higher rank. According to the rules in place for the General Debate, the statements were in one of the United Nations official languages of Arabic, Chinese, English, French, Russian or Spanish, and were translated by the United Nations translators. Each speaker was requested to provide 20 advance copies of their statements to the conference officers to facilitate translation and to be presented at the podium. Speeches are requested to be limited to five minutes, with seven minutes for supranational bodies. President Peter Thomson chose the theme of the debate as "The Sustainable Development Goals: a [sic] universal push to transform our world."

== Events ==
The Summit for Refugees and Migrants opened on 19 September along the sidelines of the General Debate in response to the European migrant crisis.

== Resolutions ==
Resolutions came before the UNGA between October 2016 and summer 2017.

The 55th meeting of the 3rd Committee during the session passed a resolution calling 2019 the "International Year of indigenous Languages" and called upon UNESCO to "serve as the lead agency for the Year."

== Elections ==
The election of non-permanent members to the Security Council for 2018–2019 was held on 2 June 2017, in which Equatorial Guinea, Ivory Coast, Kuwait, Peru and Poland were elected to fill seats that will be vacated by Egypt, Senegal, Uruguay, Japan and Ukraine on 31 December 2017. Newly-elected countries will take their seats on 1 January 2018.

An election to choose 18 members of the United Nations Human Rights Council for a three-year term took place.

A new Secretary-General, António Guterres, was chosen on 6 October 2016 and assumed office on 1 January 2017.

== See also ==
- List of UN General Assembly sessions
- List of General debates of the United Nations General Assembly
