= Peter Thomson (diplomat) =

President of the 71st UN General Assembly

His Excellency Peter Thomson OF
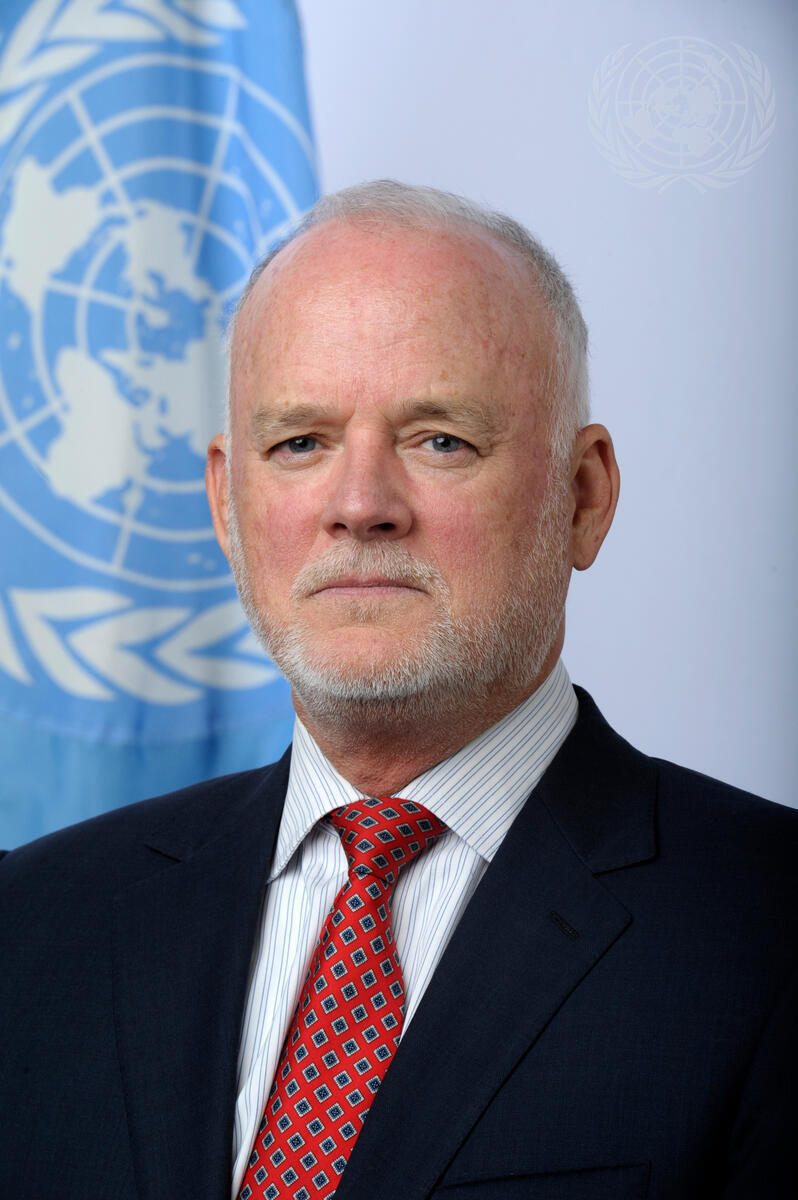
- Thomson in 2013

United Nations Secretary-General's Special Envoy for the Ocean
- Incumbent
- Assumed office 2 October 2017

71st President of the United Nations General Assembly
- In office September 2016 – September 2017
- Preceded by: Mogens Lykketoft
- Succeeded by: Miroslav Lajčák

Permanent Representative of Fiji to the United Nations
- In office February 2010 – August 2017

Personal details
- Born: 1948 (age 77–78) Suva, Rewa, Colony of Fiji
- Spouse: Marijcke Thomson
- Education: Natabua High School Sevenoaks School
- Alma mater: University of Auckland (BA); Wolfson College, Cambridge (PgDip)
- Occupation: Diplomat

Peter Thomson OF (born 1948) is a Fijian diplomat and the United Nations Secretary-General's Special Envoy for the Ocean, and President of the United Nations General Assembly from September 2016 until September 2017. He served as Fiji's Permanent Representative to the United Nations February 2010 to August 2017, with concurrent duties as Fiji's Ambassador to Cuba.

In his capacity as Fiji's Permanent Representative to the UN, in 2014, Thomson served as president of the Executive Board of the United Nations Development Programme, the United Nations Population Fund and the United Nations Office of Project Services. In the same capacity, in 2013, he took responsibility for Fiji's Chairmanship of the Group of 77 and China, the UN's largest negotiating group, made up of 133 developing countries. In 2011, he was elected as president of the 17th Session of the Assembly of the International Seabed Authority (ISA), and in 2015 was elected as president of 21st Session of the ISA Council.

During his time as Fiji's Permanent Representative to the United Nations, Thomson was the prime-mover of the name-change of the UN's Regional Group from that of "the Asian Group" to its new name of "the Asia-Pacific Group", effective 2011. In 2014, the President of Fiji conferred on Thomson the award of Officer of the Order of Fiji.

== Family ==
Peter Thomson, a fifth generation Fijian, was born to British colonial administrator Sir Ian Thomson (Colonial Secretary in the 1960s and later as Governor of the British Virgin Islands) and his wife Lady Nancy Thomson. He married publisher Marijcke Thomson in Fiji in 1973. They have two children, James and Nicola, and four granddaughters.

== Education ==
Educated at Suva Grammar School and Natabua High School, he finished schooling at the International Centre, Sevenoaks School, England, in 1967. He later obtained a BA in political studies at Auckland University and a postgraduate diploma in development studies at Wolfson College, Cambridge.

== Civil service ==
=== Duties ===
Thomson began work as a Fijian civil servant in 1972, working in rural development and local government as District Officer in the districts of Navua, Macuata and Taveuni. In 1978, he was posted to Fiji's Ministry of Foreign Affairs. He was seconded in 1979 to the Pacific Islands Forum Secretariat, before being posted to Japan in 1980 as Chargé d'Affaires, entrusted with the task of establishing Fiji's Embassy in Tokyo. He served in Tokyo until 1984, when he was appointed Fiji's Consul General in Sydney, Australia. Returning to Fiji in 1986, he served as the Government's Permanent Secretary of Information, and was a member of the boards of the Fiji Visitors Bureau, Fiji TV and the Fiji Broadcasting Commission.

In 1987, he served at Fiji's Government House as Permanent Secretary to Governor-General Ratu Sir Penaia Ganilau. During this time between the two coups d'état of 1987, the Governor-General was the sole executive authority of Fiji. After the September 1987 coup d'état, he "found himself a target as the high-profile white permanent secretary to Fiji's governor-general, embroiled in a constitutional crisis and with indigenous supremacists demanding his head". As a result, he was gaoled by the Fijian Army for four days, and subsequently emigrated to New Zealand, then Australia.

== Varied experience ==
From 1988 onwards, he worked as an investment and management consultant on Pacific Island affairs for various government agencies, regional organisations, universities and investment corporations. In 1990, the East–West Center published his diagnostic study "Trade and Investment in the Pacific Islands." His New Zealand-registered company, Thomson Pacific, managed Mitsubishi Trust Bank's real estate assets in Auckland. During this time he was a founding director and shareholder of Tabua Investments Ltd, one of the prime developers of Fiji's premier tourism resort Denarau Island Resort, and was a principal in the construction of the Sheraton Villas project at Denarau. He was a founder member of the executive committees of the Australia-Fiji Business Council, and is a founder and life-member of the New Zealand-Fiji Business Council.

== Citizenship ==
Having surrendered his Fijian citizenship by becoming a British citizen after the 1987 military coups, he regained his original citizenship in 2009, following a Fiji Government decree authorising dual citizenship. While residing in New Zealand (1987-2000) and Australia (2000-2010) he gained New Zealand and Australian citizenship.

== United Nations ==
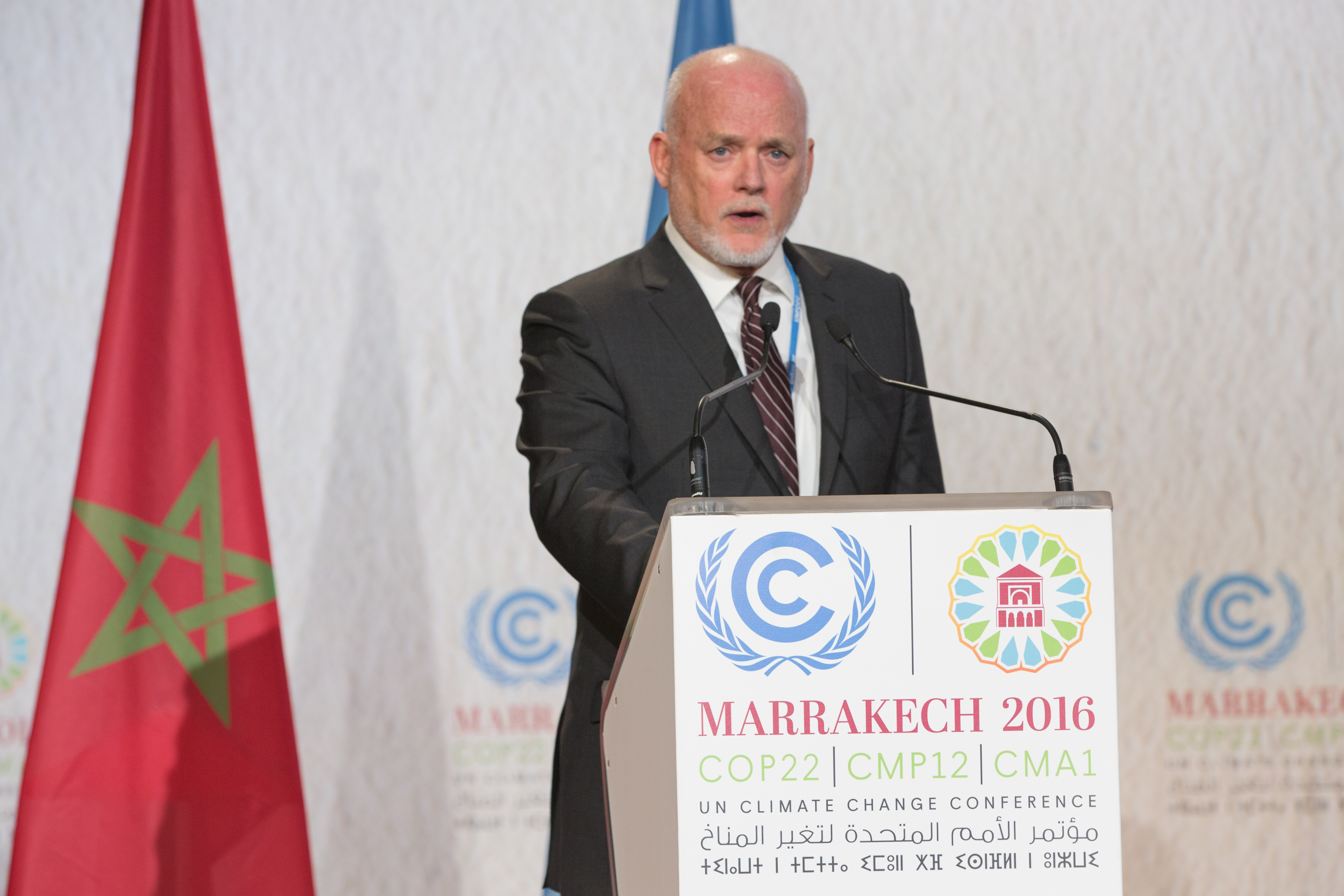
Thomson speaking in November 2016 as President of the UN General Assembly

He resumed diplomatic duties for Fiji in 2010, when he was appointed Fiji's Permanent Representative to the United Nations. He took up the post in a context where Fiji's long-standing tradition of providing peace-keeping forces to the United Nations was facing opposition from New Zealand and Australia due to the 2006 military coup in Fiji. A few months before his appointment, Thomson had publicly criticised what he described as Australia's "ongoing campaign to choke off Fiji’s role as an international peacekeeper". In 2011, the United Nations requested Fiji to increase its deployment of peacekeepers in Iraq. In 2013, a battalion of Fijian peacekeepers was deployed to UNDOF (Golan, Syria).

As Fiji's Representative to the United Nations, he strove to broaden Fiji's diplomatic relations as widely as possible, so that during his time at the United Nations, Fiji formalised diplomatic relations with over ninety countries. He has been described as "spearheading vital elements of Fiji's Look North policy." Graham Davis wrote that Ambassador Thomson had "forged a new network of international relationships for Fiji … including membership of the Non-Aligned Movement", and that he has been a prime mover in developing the influence at the UN of the Pacific Small Island Developing States. In line with these efforts, Ambassador Thomson led a successful campaign to change the UN regional group's name from "the Asian Group" to the "Asia-Pacific Group", culminating in the formal name-change in September 2011.

In 2011 in Kingston, Jamaica, he was elected as President of the Assembly of the 17th session of the International Seabed Authority (ISA), and in 2015 was elected as President of the ISA's Council. In 2011–12, he served as a Vice-President of the 66th session of the UN General Assembly in New York. In 2012, he successfully led the campaign for Fiji's election to Chairmanship of the Group of 77 and China, the UN's largest negotiating bloc of 133 developing countries, and served in that capacity throughout 2013.

In January 2014, Fiji was elected to the Presidency of the Executive Board of the United Nations Development Programme (UNDP), United Nations Population Fund (UNFPA) and the United Nations Office for Project Services (UNOPS). In his capacity as Fiji's Permanent Representative, Ambassador Thomson undertook the UNDP Presidency role, with Executive Board oversight responsibilities for over US$7 billion of UN annual funding.

During the intergovernmental negotiations at the United Nations between 2013 and 2015 leading to the adoption of the UN Sustainable Development Goals (SDGs), Ambassador Thomson was an influential spokesperson on behalf of developing countries. As part of the Pacific Small Island Developing States group, he was particularly forceful in the creation of SDG14, the Ocean Goal, that sets out to conserve and sustainably use the Ocean's resources.

On 13 June 2016, Peter Thomson was elected as the 71st President of the United Nations General Assembly. He thereby became the first person from the Pacific Islands region to fill the top post of the United Nations, serving in that capacity from September 2016 to September 2017. During his time as president, he oversaw the transition of UN Secretary-Generalship from Ban Ki-moon to Antonio Guterres. In support of the implementation of SDG14, President Thomson organised the first UN Ocean Conference. Held at the UN campus in June 2017, it was co-hosted by Fiji and Sweden, and is widely regarded as the turning point in global action to reverse the decline in the Ocean's health.

In October 2017, he was appointed as the United Nations Secretary-General's Special Envoy for the Ocean, in which role he leads UN advocacy and outreach efforts to galvanise political momentum, mobilise action and raise ambition for the implementation of the UN's Sustainable Development Goal 14.

Ambassador Peter Thomson is a founding Co-Chair of the World Economic Forum’s Friends of Ocean Action and is a supporting member of the High-Level Panel of Sustainable Ocean Economy. He has been conferred with Honorary Doctorates by the University of Bergen and the Universtiy of Edinburgh and in 2025, was awarded the WHOI (Woods Hole Oceanographic Institution) Centennial Medal.

== Bibliography ==
Thomson is the author of Kava in the Blood, his account of the 1987 Fiji coup d'état. The book was the winner of New Zealand's E.H.McCormick Prize for non-fiction in 2000. He is the editor and publisher of the pictorial/historical book Fiji in the Forties and Fifties, written by his father, with photographs by Rob Wright, and is the author of Wild Vanilla.

Positions in intergovernmental organisations
Preceded by Mogens Lykketoft	President of the United Nations General Assembly; 2016–2017	Succeeded by Miroslav Lajčák
