= Member states of the International Telecommunication Union =

Intergovernmental organization

Map of the International Telecommunication Union member states as of August 2024, with their territories (including dependent territories) recognized by the ITU in green.

The International Telecommunication Union member states are the 194 sovereign states that are members of the International Telecommunication Union (ITU) and have equal representation at its supreme decision-making body, the ITU Plenipotentiary Conference. The ITU is the world's oldest intergovernmental organization, having been founded in 1865.

Flag	Member state	Date of Entry	See also
(Afghanistan)	Afghanistan	1928-04-12	
(Albania)	Albania	1922-06-02	
(Algeria)	Algeria	1963-05-03	
(Andorra)	Andorra	1993-11-12	
(Angola)	Angola	1976-10-13	
(Antigua and Barbuda)	Antigua and Barbuda	1987-02-04	
(Argentina)	Argentina	1889-01-01	
(Armenia)	Armenia	1992-06-30	Former member: Union of Soviet Socialist Republics
(Australia)	Australia	1878-05-27	Australia and the United Nations
(Austria)	Austria	1865-05-17	
(Azerbaijan)	Azerbaijan	1992-04-10	Former member: Union of Soviet Socialist Republics
(The Bahamas)	Bahamas	1974-08-19	
(Bahrain)	Bahrain	1975-01-01	
(Bangladesh)	Bangladesh	1973-09-05	
(Barbados)	Barbados	1967-08-16	
(Belarus)	Belarus	1947-05-07	Former member: Byelorussian Soviet Socialist Republic
(Belgium)	Belgium	1865-05-17	
(Belize)	Belize	1981-12-16	
(Benin)	Benin (Note: Benin: Name was changed from Dahomey on 1 December 1975.)	1961-01-01	
(Bhutan)	Bhutan	1988-09-15	
(Bolivia)	Plurinational State of Bolivia (Note: Plurinational State of Bolivia: Previously referred to as Bolivia.)	1907-06-01	
(Bosnia and Herzegovina)	Bosnia and Herzegovina	1992-10-20	Former member: Yugoslavia (original member)
(Botswana)	Botswana	1968-04-02	
(Brazil)	Brazil	1877-07-04	Brazil and the United Nations
(Brunei)	Brunei Darussalam	1984-11-19	
(Bulgaria)	Bulgaria	1880-09-18	
(Burkina Faso)	Burkina Faso (Note: Burkina Faso: Name was changed from Upper Volta on 6 August 1984.)	1962-01-16	
(Burundi)	Burundi	1963-02-16	
(Cape Verde)	Cabo Verde (Note: Cabo Verde: Previously referred to as Cape Verde. On 24 October 2013, Cabo Verde requested that its name no longer be translated into different languages.)	1976-09-10	
(Cambodia)	Cambodia (Note: Cambodia: Name was changed to the Khmer Republic on 7 October 1970, and back to Cambodia on 30 April 1975. Name was changed again to Democratic Kampuchea on 6 April 1976, and back to Cambodia on 3 February 1990.)	1952-04-10	
(Cameroon)	Cameroon (Note: Cameroon: Previously referred to as Cameroun (before merging with Southern Cameroons in 1961). By a letter of 4 January 1974, the Secretary-General was informed that Cameroon had changed its name to the United Republic of Cameroon. Name was changed back to Cameroon on 4 February 1984.)	1960-12-22	
(Canada)	Canada	1908-07-01	Canada and the United Nations
(Central African Republic)	Central African Republic (Note: Central African Republic: By a letter of 20 December 1976, the Central African Republic advised that it had changed its name to the Central African Empire. Name was changed back to the Central African Republic on 20 September 1979.)	1960-12-02	
(Chad)	Chad	1960-11-25	
(Chile)	Chile	1908-01-01	
(China)	China	1920-09-01	Former member: Republic of China and China and the United Nations
(Colombia)	Colombia	1914-08-25	
(Comoros)	Comoros	1976-01-05	
(Republic of the Congo)	Congo (Note: Congo: Previously referred to as Congo (Brazzaville) (to differentiate it from Congo (Leopoldville)) and the People's Republic of the Congo. Name was changed to Congo on 15 November 1971 (after the Democratic Republic of the Congo changed its name to Zaire). Also referred to as Congo (Republic of the).)	1960-12-13	
(Costa Rica)	Costa Rica	1932-09-13	
(Ivory Coast)	Côte d'Ivoire (Note: Côte d'Ivoire: Previously referred to as Ivory Coast. On 6 November 1985, Côte d'Ivoire requested that its name no longer be translated into different languages; this became fully effective on 1 January 1986.)	1960-12-23	
(Croatia)	Croatia	1992-06-03	Former member: Yugoslavia (original member)
(Cuba)	Cuba	1918-01-16	
(Cyprus)	Cyprus	1961-04-24	
(Czech Republic)	Czech Republic	1993-01-01	Former member: Czechoslovakia (1920-01-10)
(North Korea)	Democratic People's Republic of Korea	1975-09-24	Korea and the United Nations
(Democratic Republic of the Congo)	Democratic Republic of the Congo (Note: Democratic Republic of the Congo: Previously referred to as Congo (Leopoldville) (to differentiate it from Congo (Brazzaville)). Name was changed from the Democratic Republic of the Congo to Zaire on 27 October 1971, and back to the Democratic Republic of the Congo on 17 May 1997.)	1961-12-06	
(Denmark)	Denmark	1865-05-17	
(Djibouti)	Djibouti	1977-11-22	
(Dominica)	Dominica	1996-10-28	
(Dominican Republic)	Dominican Republic	1926-07-11	
(Ecuador)	Ecuador	1920-04-17	
(Egypt)	Egypt	1876-12-09	Former member: United Arab Republic
(El Salvador)	El Salvador	1927-10-12	
(Equatorial Guinea)	Equatorial Guinea	1970-07-02	
(Eritrea)	Eritrea	1993-08-06	
(Estonia)	Estonia	1992-04-22	Former member: Union of Soviet Socialist Republics (Estonia originally joined 1922-05-19 before the Soviet occupation)
(Eswatini)	Eswatini (Note: Eswatini: Name was changed from Swaziland on 19 April 2018.)	1970-11-11	
(Ethiopia)	Ethiopia	1932-02-20	
(Fiji)	Fiji	1971-05-05	Fiji and the United Nations
(Finland)	Finland	1920-09-01	
(France)	France	1865-05-17	France and the United Nations
(Gabon)	Gabon	1960-12-28	
(The Gambia)	Republic of The Gambia (Note: Republic of The Gambia: Previously referred to as The Gambia.)	1974-05-27	
(Georgia (country))	Georgia	1993-01-07	Former member: Union of Soviet Socialist Republics
(Germany)	Germany	1865-05-17	Former member: German Democratic Republic and Germany and the United Nations
(Ghana)	Ghana	1957-05-17	
(Greece)	Greece	1869-01-01	
(Grenada)	Grenada	1981-11-17	
(Guatemala)	Guatemala	1914-07-10	
(Guinea)	Guinea	1959-03-09	
(Guinea-Bissau)	Guinea-Bissau	1976-01-15	
(Guyana)	Guyana	1967-03-08	
(Haiti)	Haiti	1927-10-10	
(Honduras)	Honduras	1925-10-27	
(Hungary)	Hungary	1865-05-17	
(Iceland)	Iceland	1906-10-01	
(India)	India	1871-02-24	India and the United Nations
(Indonesia)	Indonesia (Note: Withdrew from the UN on 20 January 1965. It rejoined on 28 September 1966.)	1949-01-01	Withdrawal of Indonesia (1965–1966) and Indonesia and the United Nations
(Iran)	Islamic Republic of Iran (Note: Islamic Republic of Iran: Previously referred to as Iran. By a communication of 5 March 1981, Iran informed the Secretary-General that it should be referred to by its complete name of the Islamic Republic of Iran.)	1869-01-01	
(Iraq)	Iraq	1928-11-12	
(Republic of Ireland)	Ireland	1923-12-08	
(Israel)	Israel	1948-06-24	Israel and the United Nations
(Italy)	Italy	1865-05-17	
(Jamaica)	Jamaica	1963-02-18	
(Japan)	Japan	1879-01-29	Japan and the United Nations
(Jordan)	Jordan	1947-05-20	
(Kazakhstan)	Kazakhstan (Note: Kazakhstan: Spelling was changed from Kazakstan on 20 June 1997.)	1993-02-23	Former member: Union of Soviet Socialist Republics
(Kenya)	Kenya	1964-04-11	
(Kiribati)	Kiribati	1986-11-03	
(Kuwait)	Kuwait	1959-08-14	
(Kyrgyzstan)	Kyrgyzstan	1994-01-20	Former member: Union of Soviet Socialist Republics
(Laos)	Lao People's Democratic Republic (Note: Lao People's Democratic Republic: Name was changed from Laos on 2 December 1975.)	1952-04-03	
(Latvia)	Latvia	1991-11-11	Former member: Union of Soviet Socialist Republics (Latvia originally joined 1921-12-11 before the Soviet occupation)
(Lebanon)	Lebanon	1924-01-12	
(Lesotho)	Lesotho	1967-05-26	
(Liberia)	Liberia	1927-10-10	
(Libya)	Libya (Note: Libya: Formerly recognised as the Libyan Arab Republic from 1969 after originally being admitted as Libya. By notes verbales of 1 and 21 April 1977, the Libyan Arab Republic advised that it had changed its name to the Libyan Arab Jamahiriya. On 16 September 2011, the UN General Assembly awarded the UN seat to the National Transitional Council, thereby restoring the original name of Libya.)	1953-02-03	
(Liechtenstein)	Liechtenstein	1963-07-25	
(Lithuania)	Lithuania	1991-10-12	Former member: Union of Soviet Socialist Republics (Lithuania originally joined 1923-07-01 before the Soviet Occupation)
(Luxembourg)	Luxembourg	1866-03-02	Luxembourg and the United Nations
(Madagascar)	Madagascar (Note: Madagascar: Previously referred to as the Malagasy Republic.)	1961-05-11	
(Malawi)	Malawi	1965-02-19	
(Malaysia)	Malaysia	1958-02-03	Former member: Federation of Malaya and Malaysia and the United Nations
(Maldives)	Maldives (Note: Maldives: Previously referred to as the Maldive Islands.)	1967-02-28	21 September 1965
(Mali)	Mali	1960-10-21	
(Malta)	Malta	1965-01-01	
(Marshall Islands)	Marshall Islands	1996-02-22	Marshall Islands and the United Nations
(Mauritania)	Mauritania	1962-04-18	
(Mauritius)	Mauritius	1969-08-30	
(Mexico)	Mexico	1908-07-01	Mexico and the United Nations
(Federated States of Micronesia)	Federated States of Micronesia	1993-03-18	Federated States of Micronesia and the United Nations
(Monaco)	Monaco	1908-07-01	
(Mongolia)	Mongolia	1964-08-27	
(Montenegro)	Montenegro	2006-06-21	Former member: Yugoslavia (original member) and Serbia and Montenegro
(Morocco)	Morocco	1956-11-01	
(Mozambique)	Mozambique	1975-11-04	
(Myanmar)	Myanmar (Note: Myanmar: Name was changed from Burma on 18 June 1989.)	1937-09-15	
(Namibia)	Namibia	1984-01-25	
(Nauru)	Nauru	1969-06-10	
(Nepal)	Nepal	1957-12-05	
(Kingdom of the Netherlands)	Netherlands	1865-05-17	
(New Zealand)	New Zealand	1878-06-03	New Zealand and the United Nations
(Nicaragua)	Nicaragua	1926-05-12	
(Niger)	Niger	1960-11-14	
(Nigeria)	Nigeria	1961-04-11	
(North Macedonia)	North Macedonia (Note: North Macedonia: Originally admitted under the temporary UN designation The former Yugoslav Republic of Macedonia.)	1993-05-04	Former member: Yugoslavia (original member)
(Norway)	Norway	1865-05-17	
(Oman)	Oman	1972-04-28	
(Pakistan)	Pakistan	1947-08-26	Pakistan and the United Nations
(Panama)	Panama	1914-07-14	
(Papua New Guinea)	Papua New Guinea	1975-10-31	
(Paraguay)	Paraguay	1927-09-27	
(Peru)	Peru	1915-07-12	
(Philippines)	Philippines (Note: Philippines: Previously referred to as the Philippine Commonwealth (before becoming a republic in 1946) and as the Philippine Republic.)	1912-05-25	Philippines and the United Nations
(Poland)	Poland	1921-01-01	
(Portugal)	Portugal	1865-05-17	
(Qatar)	Qatar	1973-03-27	
(South Korea)	Republic of Korea	1952-01-31	Korea and the United Nations
(Moldova)	Republic of Moldova (Note: Republic of Moldova: Previously referred to as Moldova.)	1992-10-20	Former member: Union of Soviet Socialist Republics
	Republic of Palau	2024-09-19	
(Romania)	Romania	1866-02-09	
(Russia)	Russian Federation	1865-05-17	Former member: Union of Soviet Socialist Republics and Soviet Union and the United Nations and Russia and the United Nations
(Rwanda)	Rwanda	1962-12-12	
(Saint Kitts and Nevis)	Saint Kitts and Nevis (Note: Saint Kitts and Nevis: Name was changed officially from Saint Christopher and Nevis on 26 November 1986; the UN, however, continued to use the former name throughout the year.)	2006-03-15	
(Saint Lucia)	Saint Lucia	1997-09-04	
(Saint Vincent and the Grenadines)	Saint Vincent and the Grenadines	1983-03-25	
(Samoa)	Samoa	1988-10-07	
(San Marino)	San Marino	1977-03-25	
(São Tomé and Príncipe)	São Tomé and Príncipe (Note: Sao Tome and Principe: The official UN designation lacks diacritics; however, the name is constitutionally defined as São Tomé and Príncipe, with diacritics.)	1976-09-01	
(Saudi Arabia)	Saudi Arabia	1949-02-07	
(Senegal)	Senegal	1960-11-15	
(Serbia)	Serbia	1866	Former member: Yugoslavia (original member), Serbia and Montenegro, and Serbia and the United Nations (suspended from 1992 due to the dissolution of SFR Yugoslavia, re-admitted as FR Yugoslavia 2001-06-10)
(Seychelles)	Seychelles	1999-09-17	
(Sierra Leone)	Sierra Leone	1961-12-30	
(Singapore)	Singapore	1965-10-22	Former member: Malaysia and Singapore and the United Nations
(Slovakia)	Slovakia	1993-02-23	Former member: Czechoslovakia (1920-01-10)
(Slovenia)	Slovenia	1992-06-16	Former member: Yugoslavia (original member)
(Solomon Islands)	Solomon Islands	1987-07-27	
(Somalia)	Somalia	1962-09-28	
(South Africa)	South Africa (Note: South Africa: Previously referred to as the Union of South Africa (before becoming a republic in 1961).)	1910-01-01	
(South Sudan)	South Sudan	2011-10-03	
(Spain)	Spain	1865-05-17	
(Sri Lanka)	Sri Lanka (Note: Sri Lanka: Name was changed from Ceylon on 22 May 1972.)	1897-01-01	
(Sudan)	Sudan	1957-10-23	
(Suriname)	Suriname (Note: Suriname: Name was changed from Surinam on 23 January 1978.)	1976-07-15	
(Sweden)	Sweden	1865-05-17	
(Switzerland)	Switzerland	1865-05-17	
(Syria)	Syrian Arab Republic	1924-01-12	Former member: United Arab Republic
(Tajikistan)	Tajikistan	1994-04-28	Former member: Union of Soviet Socialist Republics
(Thailand)	Thailand (Note: Thailand: Previously referred to as Siam.)	1883-04-21	
(Timor-Leste)	Timor-Leste	2010-08-24	
(Togo)	Togo	1961-09-14	
(Tonga)	Tonga	1972-01-07	
(Trinidad and Tobago)	Trinidad and Tobago	1965-03-06	Trinidad and Tobago and the United Nations
(Tunisia)	Tunisia	1956-12-14	
(Turkey)	Turkey	1865-05-17	
(Turkmenistan)	Turkmenistan	1993-05-07	Former member: Union of Soviet Socialist Republics
(Tuvalu)	Tuvalu	1996-08-15	Tuvalu and the United Nations
(Uganda)	Uganda	1963-03-08	
(Ukraine)	Ukraine	1947-05-07	Former member: Ukrainian Soviet Socialist Republic
(United Arab Emirates)	United Arab Emirates	1972-06-27	
(United Kingdom)	United Kingdom of Great Britain and Northern Ireland	1871-02-24	United Kingdom and the United Nations
(Tanzania)	United Republic of Tanzania	1962-10-31	Former member: Tanganyika and Zanzibar
(United States)	United States of America	1908-07-01	United States and the United Nations
(Uruguay)	Uruguay	1902-07-01	
(Uzbekistan)	Uzbekistan	1992-07-10	Former member: Union of Soviet Socialist Republics
(Vanuatu)	Vanuatu	1988-03-30	Vanuatu and the United Nations
(Vatican City)	Vatican City	1929-06-01	
(Venezuela)	Bolivarian Republic of Venezuela (Note: Bolivarian Republic of Venezuela: Previously referred to as Venezuela.)	1920-08-13	
(Vietnam)	Vietnam	1951-09-24	
(Yemen)	Yemen	1931-01-01	Former members: Yemen and Democratic Yemen
(Zambia)	Zambia	1965-08-23	
(Zimbabwe)	Zimbabwe	1981-02-10	
