= Member states of the United Nations =

193 United Nations member states 2 UN General Assembly observer states (the Holy See (Note: The sovereign entity with statehood over the territory of the Vatican City State.) and Palestine) 2 non-member states (the Cook Islands and Niue) 17 non-self-governing territories Antarctica (assertion of territorial claims suspended under the Antarctic Treaty System)

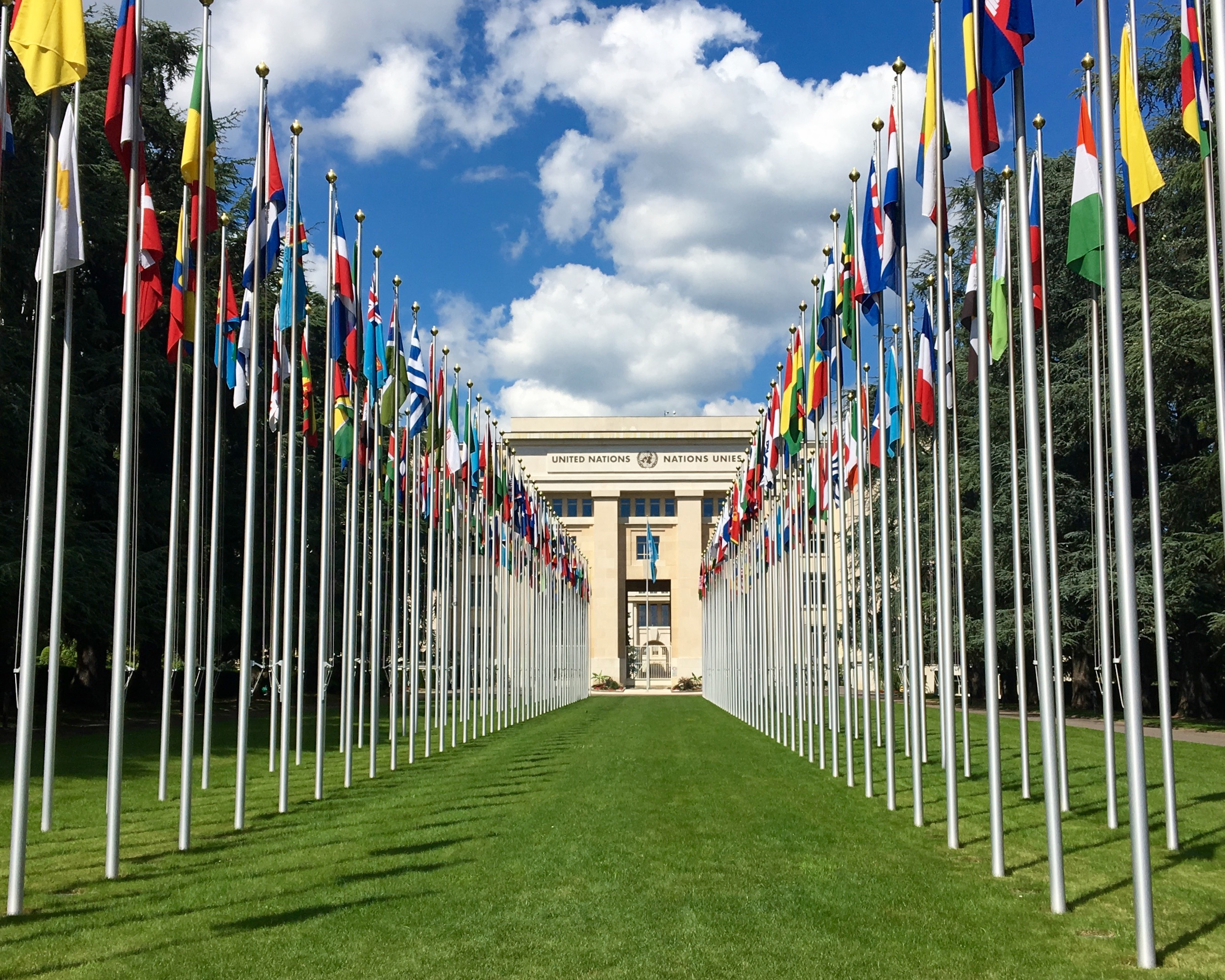
Flags of the member states of the United Nations, in front of the Palace of Nations (Geneva, Switzerland). Since 2015, the flags of the two observer states are raised alongside those of the 193 member states.

The United Nations comprise 193 sovereign states and the world's largest intergovernmental organization. All members have equal representation in the United Nations General Assembly.

The Charter of the United Nations defines the rules for admission of member states. Membership is open to all states which accept certain terms of the charter and are able to carry them out. New members must be recommended by the United Nations Security Council. In addition to the member states, the UN also invites non-member states to be observer states at the UN General Assembly. A member state that has persistently violated the principles of the United Nations Charter can be expelled from the United Nations.

== Membership ==
The criteria for admission of new members to the UN are established in Chapter II, Article 4 of the UN Charter:

- Membership in the United Nations is open to all states which accept the obligations contained in the present Charter and, in the judgment of the Organization, are able and willing to carry out these obligations.
- The admission of any such state to membership in the United Nations will be effected by a decision of the General Assembly upon the recommendation of the Security Council.

A recommendation for admission from the Security Council requires affirmative votes from at least nine of the council's fifteen members, with none of the five permanent members using their veto power. The Security Council's recommendation must then be approved in the General Assembly by a two-thirds majority vote.

In principle, only sovereign states can become UN members, and currently, all UN members are sovereign states. Although five members were not sovereign when they joined the UN, they all subsequently became fully independent between 1946 and 1991. Because a state can only be admitted to membership in the UN by the approval of the Security Council and the General Assembly, a number of states that are considered sovereign according to the Montevideo Convention are not members of the UN. This is because the UN does not consider them to possess sovereignty, mainly due to the lack of international recognition or due to opposition from one of the permanent members.

In addition to the member states, the UN also invites non-member states to become observer states at the UN General Assembly, allowing them to participate and speak in General Assembly meetings, but not vote. Observers are generally intergovernmental organizations and international organizations and entities whose statehood or sovereignty is not precisely defined.

== Original members ==
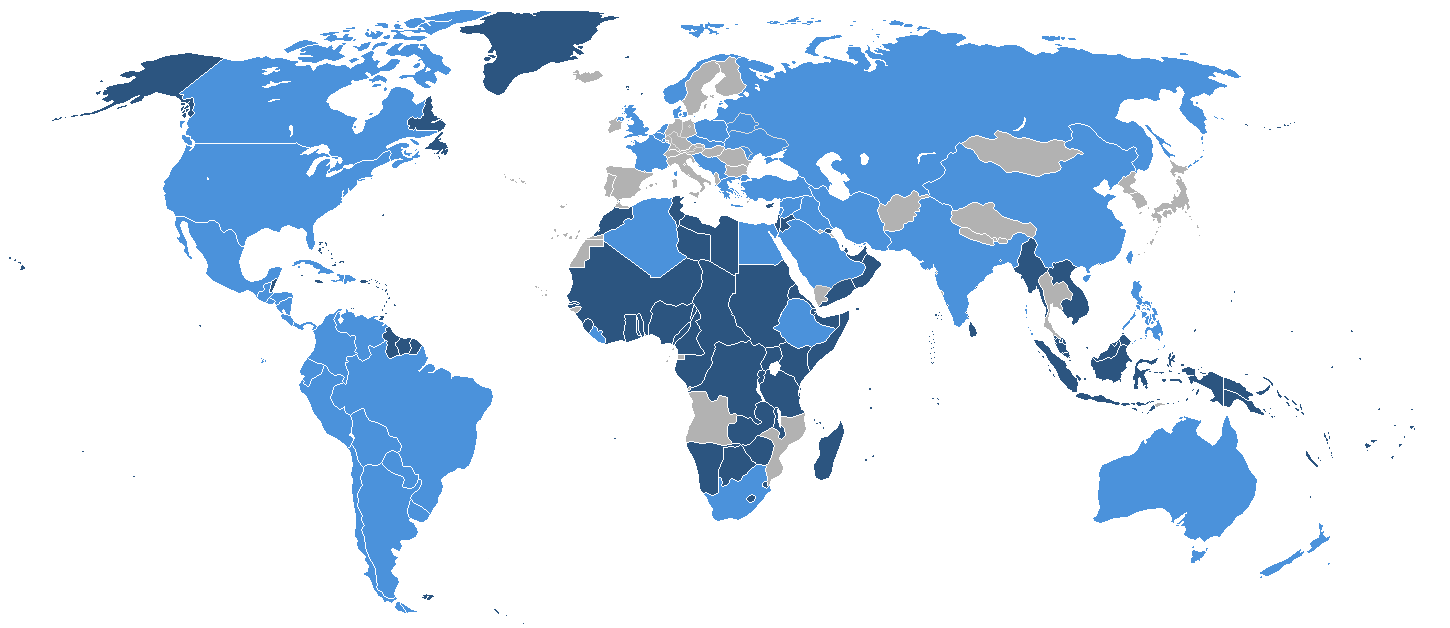
The world in 1945, after World War II. In light blue, the founding members of the United Nations. In dark blue, protectorates and territories of the founding members.

The UN officially came into existence on 24 October 1945, after ratification of the United Nations Charter by the five permanent members of the United Nations Security Council (the Republic of China, France, the Soviet Union, the United Kingdom, and the United States) and a majority of the other signatories. A total of 51 original members (or founding members) joined that year; 50 of them signed the Charter at the United Nations Conference on International Organization in San Francisco on 26 June 1945, while Poland, which was not represented at the conference, signed it on 15 October 1945.

The original members of the United Nations were: France (then the Provisional Government), Russia (then the Soviet Union), China (then Republic of China), the United Kingdom, the United States—these first five forming the Security Council—Argentina, Australia, Belarus (then the Byelorussian SSR), Belgium, Bolivia, Brazil (then the Vargas Era Brazil), Canada, Chile (then the 1925–73 Presidential Republic), Colombia, Costa Rica, Cuba (then the 1902–59 Republic), Czechoslovakia (then the Third Republic), Denmark, the Dominican Republic, Ecuador, Egypt (then the Kingdom of Egypt), El Salvador, Ethiopia (then the Ethiopian Empire), Greece (then the Kingdom of Greece), Guatemala, Haiti (then the 1859–1957 Republic), Honduras, India (then the British Raj), Iran (then the Imperial State of Iran), Iraq (then the Kingdom of Iraq), Lebanon, Liberia, Luxembourg, Mexico, the Netherlands, New Zealand (then the Dominion of New Zealand), Nicaragua, Norway, Panama, Paraguay, Peru, the Philippines (then the Commonwealth), Poland (then the Provisional Government of National Unity), Saudi Arabia, South Africa (then the Union of South Africa), Syria (then the Mandatory Republic), Turkey, Ukraine (then the Ukrainian SSR), Uruguay, Venezuela and Yugoslavia (then the Democratic Federal Yugoslavia).

Among the original members, 49 are either still UN members or had their memberships in the UN continued by a successor state (see table below); for example, the membership of the Soviet Union was continued by the Russian Federation after its dissolution (see the section Former members: Union of Soviet Socialist Republics). The other two original members, Czechoslovakia and Yugoslavia (i.e., the Socialist Federal Republic of Yugoslavia), had been dissolved and their memberships in the UN not continued from 1992 by any one successor state (see the sections Former members: Czechoslovakia and Former members: Yugoslavia).

At the time of UN's founding, the seat of China in the UN was held by the Republic of China, but as a result of United Nations General Assembly Resolution 2758 in 1971, it is now held by the People's Republic of China (see the section Former members: Republic of China (Taiwan)).

United Nations membership status

A number of the original members were not sovereign when they joined the UN, and only gained full independence later:

- Belarus (then the Byelorussian Soviet Socialist Republic) and Ukraine (then the Ukrainian Soviet Socialist Republic) were both constituent republics of the Soviet Union, until gaining full independence in 1991.
- India (whose territory at that time, before the Partition of India, also included the present-day territories of Bangladesh and Pakistan) was under British colonial rule, until gaining full independence in 1947.
- New Zealand, while de facto sovereign at that time, "only gained full capacity to enter into relations with other states in 1947 when it passed the Statute of Westminster Adoption Act. This occurred 16 years after the British Parliament passed the Statute of Westminster Act in 1931 that recognised New Zealand's autonomy. If judged by the Montevideo Convention criteria, New Zealand did not achieve full de jure statehood until 1947." However, the UN considers New Zealand to have been independent in 1945, at the time the UN was formed.
- The Philippines (then the Philippine Commonwealth) was a commonwealth with the United States, until gaining full independence in 1946.

== Current members ==
UN member states
Member state	Date of admission	Notes
Afghanistan	19 November 1946	Afghanistan and the United Nations The United Nations currently does not recognize any person as the head of state of Afghanistan, nor does it recognize any other Afghan official as legitimate, having determined through a process involving two committees that the last officeholders lost their authority when the government the UN recognized, the Islamic Republic of Afghanistan, ceased to exist on 15 August 2021, and was therefore no longer official. (Note: The UN has largely attempted to avoid making decisions of any kind on Afghanistan's representation, preferring to keep Faiq by default, and not changing the name "Islamic Republic of Afghanistan" on the Official Names of the United Nations Membership or ending the use of its flag, despite the functional decision made no longer to consider the IRA a legal representative at the UN, allowing Faiq to operate independently without answering to anyone.) UN legal and political experts made this determination when Haneef Atmar, who had been the recognized foreign minister, attempted to communicate with the UN in 2022. The country's temporary representative Naseer Faiq has been retained by default on the decision of the UN, against the wishes of Atmar and other members of the UN delegation. Faiq has since forcefully denied being a representative of the Islamic Republic, accusing its officials of corruption and claiming to represent Afghanistan independently. His voting rights in the General Assembly were suspended under Article 19 of the UN Charter in 2024. A decision on whether to credential appointees of the new Taliban authorities has been repeatedly deferred.
Albania	14 December 1955	
Algeria	8 October 1962	
Andorra	28 July 1993	
Angola	1 December 1976	
Antigua and Barbuda	11 November 1981	
Argentina	24 October 1945	Argentina and the United Nations
Armenia	2 March 1992	Former member: Union of Soviet Socialist Republics and Armenia and the United Nations
Australia	1 November 1945	Australia and the United Nations
Austria	14 December 1955	
Azerbaijan	2 March 1992	Former member: Union of Soviet Socialist Republics, and Azerbaijan and the United Nations
Bahamas, The	18 September 1973	
Bahrain	21 September 1971	
Bangladesh	17 September 1974	Bangladesh and the United Nations
Barbados	9 December 1966	
Belarus	24 October 1945	Former member: Byelorussian Soviet Socialist Republic
Belgium	27 December 1945	Belgium and the United Nations
Belize	25 September 1981	
Benin	20 September 1960	Name was changed from Dahomey on 2 December 1975.
Bhutan	21 September 1971	
Bolivia	14 November 1945	
Bosnia and Herzegovina	22 May 1992	Former member: Yugoslavia
Botswana	17 October 1966	
Brazil	24 October 1945	Brazil and the United Nations
Brunei	21 September 1984	
Bulgaria	14 December 1955	
Burkina Faso	20 September 1960	Name was changed from Upper Volta on 6 August 1984.
Burundi	18 September 1962	
Cabo Verde	16 September 1975	Previously referred to as Cape Verde. On 24 October 2013, Cabo Verde requested that its name no longer be translated into different languages.
Cambodia	14 December 1955	Name was changed to the Khmer Republic on 7 October 1970, and back to Cambodia on 30 April 1975. Name was changed again to Democratic Kampuchea on 6 April 1976, and back to Cambodia on 3 February 1990.
Cameroon	20 September 1960	Previously referred to as Cameroun (before merging with Southern Cameroons in 1961). By a letter of 4 January 1974, the Secretary-General was informed that Cameroon had changed its name to the United Republic of Cameroon. Name was changed back to Cameroon on 4 February 1984.
Canada	9 November 1945	Canada and the United Nations
Central African Republic	20 September 1960	Country known as Central African Empire from 20 December 1976 to 20 September 1979.
Chad	20 September 1960	
Chile	24 October 1945	
China	24 October 1945	China and the United Nations; Former member: Republic of China
Colombia	5 November 1945	Colombia and the United Nations
Comoros	12 November 1975	
Congo	20 September 1960	Previously referred to as the People's Republic of the Congo. Name was changed to Congo on 15 November 1971.
Costa Rica	2 November 1945	Costa Rica and the United Nations
Côte d'Ivoire	20 September 1960	Until 31 December 1985 referred to as Ivory Coast.
Croatia	22 May 1992	Former member: Yugoslavia
Cuba	24 October 1945	
Cyprus	20 September 1960	
Czechia	19 January 1993	Former member: Czechoslovakia Name was changed from Czech Republic on 17 May 2016. Its nameplate continued to display Czech Republic until sometime in 2022.
Democratic People's Republic of Korea	17 September 1991	Korea and the United Nations
Democratic Republic of the Congo	20 September 1960	Country used the name Zaire from 27 October 1971 to 16 May 1997.
Denmark (Note: Denmark represents its metropolitan portion as well as the other constituent countries of the Danish Realm: the Faroe Islands and Greenland.)	24 October 1945	
Djibouti	20 September 1977	
Dominica	18 December 1978	
Dominican Republic	24 October 1945	
Ecuador	21 December 1945	
Egypt	24 October 1945	Egypt and the United Nations; Former member: United Arab Republic
El Salvador	24 October 1945	
Equatorial Guinea	12 November 1968	
Eritrea	28 May 1993	
Estonia	17 September 1991	
Eswatini	24 September 1968	Name was changed from Swaziland on 19 April 2018.
Ethiopia	13 November 1945	Ethiopia and the United Nations
Fiji	13 October 1970	Fiji and the United Nations
Finland	14 December 1955	
France	24 October 1945	France and the United Nations
Gabon	20 September 1960	
Gambia (Republic of The)	21 September 1965	
Georgia	31 July 1992	Former member: Union of Soviet Socialist Republics
Germany	18 September 1973	Former member: German Democratic Republic East Germany and West Germany were admitted separately on the same date; they unified in 1990; see also Germany and the United Nations.
Ghana	8 March 1957	
Greece	25 October 1945	
Grenada	17 September 1974	
Guatemala	21 November 1945	
Guinea	12 December 1958	
Guinea-Bissau	17 September 1974	
Guyana	20 September 1966	
Haiti	24 October 1945	
Honduras	17 December 1945	
Hungary	14 December 1955	
Iceland	19 November 1946	
India	30 October 1945	India and the United Nations
Indonesia	28 September 1950	Indonesia and the United Nations
Iran (Islamic Republic of)	24 October 1945	Previously referred to as Iran. By a communication of 4 November 1982, Iran informed the Secretary-General that it should be referred to as the Islamic Republic of Iran.
Iraq	21 December 1945	
Ireland	14 December 1955	
Israel	11 May 1949	Israel and the United Nations
Italy	14 December 1955	
Jamaica	18 September 1962	
Japan	18 December 1956	Japan and the United Nations
Jordan	14 December 1955	
Kazakhstan	2 March 1992	Former member: Union of Soviet Socialist Republics Spelling was changed from Kazakstan on 20 June 1997.
Kenya	16 December 1963	
Kiribati	14 September 1999	
Kuwait	14 May 1963	
Kyrgyzstan	2 March 1992	Former member: Union of Soviet Socialist Republics
Lao People's Democratic Republic	14 December 1955	Name was changed from Laos on 2 December 1975.
Latvia	17 September 1991	
Lebanon	24 October 1945	Lebanon and the United Nations
Lesotho	17 October 1966	
Liberia	2 November 1945	
Libya	14 December 1955	Formerly recognised as the Libyan Arab Republic from 1969 after originally being admitted as Libya. By notes verbales of 1 and 21 April 1977, the Libyan Arab Republic advised that it had changed its name to the Libyan Arab Jamahiriya. On 16 September 2011, the UN General Assembly awarded the UN seat to the National Transitional Council, thereby restoring the original name of Libya. On 12 December 2022, the Credentials Committee deferred a decision on allowing the Government of National Stability to represent Libya at the U.N., allowing the Government of National Unity to retain the seat.
Liechtenstein	18 September 1990	Liechtenstein and the United Nations
Lithuania	17 September 1991	
Luxembourg	24 October 1945	Luxembourg and the United Nations
Madagascar	20 September 1960	
Malawi	1 December 1964	
Malaysia	17 September 1957	Malaysia and the United Nations; Name was changed from Federation of Malaya on 16 September 1963, following the admission to the new federation of Singapore, Sabah and Sarawak.
Maldives	21 September 1965	Name was changed from Maldive Islands on 14 April 1969.
Mali	28 September 1960	
Malta	1 December 1964	
Marshall Islands	17 September 1991	Marshall Islands and the United Nations
Mauritania	27 October 1961	
Mauritius	24 April 1968	
Mexico	7 November 1945	Mexico and the United Nations
Micronesia (Federated States of)	17 September 1991	Federated States of Micronesia and the United Nations
Monaco	28 May 1993	
Mongolia	27 October 1961	
Montenegro	28 June 2006	Former member: Yugoslavia, Serbia and Montenegro
Morocco	12 November 1956	
Mozambique	16 September 1975	
Myanmar	19 April 1948	Name was changed from Burma on 17 June 1989. The UN has repeatedly deferred any consideration of credentialing Min Aung Hlaing's nominee for Permanent Representative after he seized power in 2021 and served as a transitional military ruler until becoming the president in 2026. Even after Min Aung Hlaing's transition to the civilian presidency in 2026, the UN has not credentialed his nominee or identified him as the head of state (despite publishing an updated list just three days after his inauguration), with UN Secretary General António Guterres labeling the election process not free or fair. The list still names former president Win Myint as the current president, despite his lack of participation in any political activity. Even after Win Myint's 2026 release from prison upon being pardoned by Min Aung Hlaing, he has stayed silent on whether he supports the unrecognized opposition National Unity Government of Myanmar (NUG), which has unilaterally designated him its president without his involvement. While still the president, Win Myint appointed Kyaw Moe Tun as Myanmar's permanent representative to the UN in 2020, and he continues to hold the position and vote on Myanmar's behalf in the General Assembly. Kyaw Moe Tun has aligned himself with the NUG, though the NUG has not been recognized by the UN nor by any country in the world, and there is no formal UN engagement with its leadership. UN official Richard Gowan has stated that Kyaw Moe Tun is not a representative of the NUG at the UN, and the UN has refused the NUG's attempts to appoint a replacement for Kyaw Moe Tun on that basis. Most countries of the world have taken an ambiguous stance on who they recognize as the president of Myanmar, while many others, including the major powers Russia and China as well as fellow regional ASEAN members Cambodia and Thailand, sent Myanmar formal letters of congratulation on Min Aung Hlaing's appointment as the president.
Namibia	23 April 1990	
Naoero	14 September 1999	Previously referred to as Nauru until 26 June 2026.
Nepal	14 December 1955	
Netherlands (Note: The Netherlands represents itself, as well as the three other constituent countries of the Kingdom of the Netherlands: Aruba, Curaçao, and Sint Maarten.)	10 December 1945	Netherlands and the United Nations
New Zealand	24 October 1945	New Zealand and the United Nations
Nicaragua	24 October 1945	
Niger	20 September 1960	
Nigeria	7 October 1960	
North Macedonia	8 April 1993	Former member: Yugoslavia Name was changed from The former Yugoslav Republic of Macedonia on 11 February 2019.
Norway	27 November 1945	
Oman	7 October 1971	
Pakistan	30 September 1947	Pakistan and the United Nations
Palau	15 December 1994	
Panama	13 November 1945	
Papua New Guinea	10 October 1975	
Paraguay	24 October 1945	
Peru	31 October 1945	Peru and the United Nations
Philippines	24 October 1945	Philippines and the United Nations
Poland	24 October 1945	Poland and the United Nations
Portugal	14 December 1955	
Qatar	21 September 1971	
Republic of Korea	17 September 1991	Korea and the United Nations
Republic of Moldova	2 March 1992	Former member: Union of Soviet Socialist Republics Referred to as Moldova from 6 October 2006 to 10 September 2008.
Romania	14 December 1955	
Russian Federation	24 October 1945	Former member: Union of Soviet Socialist Republics (Soviet Union and the United Nations) and Russia and the United Nations
Rwanda	18 September 1962	
Saint Kitts and Nevis	23 September 1983	Referred to as Saint Christopher and Nevis until 28 December 1986.
Saint Lucia	18 September 1979	
Saint Vincent and the Grenadines	16 September 1980	
Samoa	15 December 1976	The country was formerly named "Western Samoa" until 4 July 1997, but nevertheless always referred to as just "Samoa".
San Marino	2 March 1992	
Sao Tome and Principe	16 September 1975	
Saudi Arabia	24 October 1945	
Senegal	28 September 1960	
Serbia	1 November 2000	Former member: Yugoslavia, Serbia and Montenegro, and Serbia and the United Nations
Seychelles	21 September 1976	
Sierra Leone	27 September 1961	
Singapore	21 September 1965	Former member: Malaysia and Singapore and the United Nations
Slovakia	19 January 1993	Former member: Czechoslovakia
Slovenia	22 May 1992	Former member: Yugoslavia
Solomon Islands	19 September 1978	
Somalia	20 September 1960	
South Africa	7 November 1945	Referred to as the Union of South Africa until 13 May 1961.
South Sudan	14 July 2011	
Spain	14 December 1955	Spain and the United Nations
Sri Lanka	14 December 1955	Name was changed from Ceylon on 29 August 1972.
Sudan	12 November 1956	
Suriname	4 December 1975	Name was changed from Surinam on 23 January 1978.
Sweden	19 November 1946	
Switzerland	10 September 2002	
Syrian Arab Republic	24 October 1945	Former member: United Arab Republic
Tajikistan	2 March 1992	Former member: Union of Soviet Socialist Republics
Thailand	16 December 1946	
Timor-Leste	27 September 2002	
Togo	20 September 1960	
Tonga	14 September 1999	
Trinidad and Tobago	18 September 1962	Trinidad and Tobago and the United Nations
Tunisia	12 November 1956	
Türkiye	24 October 1945	Turkey and the United Nations Previously referred to as Turkey until 31 May 2022.
Turkmenistan	2 March 1992	Former member: Union of Soviet Socialist Republics
Tuvalu	5 September 2000	Tuvalu and the United Nations
Uganda	25 October 1962	
Ukraine	24 October 1945	Former member: Ukrainian Soviet Socialist Republic, Ukraine and the United Nations
United Arab Emirates	9 December 1971	
United Kingdom of Great Britain and Northern Ireland	24 October 1945	United Kingdom and the United Nations
United Republic of Tanzania	14 December 1961	Former member: Zanzibar Name was changed from United Republic of Tanganyika and Zanzibar on 2 November 1964.
United States of America	24 October 1945	United States and the United Nations
Uruguay	18 December 1945	
Uzbekistan	2 March 1992	Former member: Union of Soviet Socialist Republics
Vanuatu	15 September 1981	Vanuatu and the United Nations
Venezuela (Bolivarian Republic of)	15 November 1945	Previously referred to as Venezuela until 17 November 2004.
Vietnam	20 September 1977	Vietnam and the United Nations
Yemen	30 September 1947	Former members: Yemen and People's Democratic Republic of Yemen
Zambia	1 December 1964	
Zimbabwe	25 August 1980	

=== Package deal ===
The start of the Cold War led to membership conflicts almost immediately, with the United States refusing to admit countries in Eastern Europe while the Soviet Union refused to admit countries in Western Europe. Starting as early as January 1946, the United States used its "automatic majority" on the Security Council (Note: Before 1966, at least five seats out of eleven, and often more, were guaranteed to be aligned with the United States, enough to block the required seven-vote supermajority without a veto.) to refuse the application of Albania without a veto, while the Soviet Union vetoed the applications of Ireland, Portugal and Finland. The Soviet Union also vetoed the applications of Jordan and Ceylon, stating that it did not believe they were sufficiently independent from the United Kingdom.

Starting in September 1949, the Soviet Union began to veto the applications of some neutral countries such as Nepal as well, stating that it would not admit them until its preferred applicants were also admitted. Both the United States and Soviet Union stated that they were willing to admit each other's preferred applicants, but the United States demanded that Western European applicants be voted on first while the Soviet Union demanded that Eastern European applicants be voted on first. Both superpowers refused to allow multiple applicants to be voted on simultaneously.

The impasse continued until the death of Stalin caused a brief thaw in the Cold War. By this time, 18 applications had been blocked, and the superpowers stated that they would no longer oppose a simultaneous vote. The veto of Mongolia by the Republic of China delayed the proceedings by one day, with the Soviet Union offering to exclude Mongolia from the list of 18 if Japan were also excluded. The United States abstained on the offering. In what was widely described as a "package deal", the remaining 16 countries (Albania, Jordan, Ireland, Portugal, Italy, Austria, Finland, Ceylon, Nepal, Libya, Cambodia, Laos, Hungary, Romania, Bulgaria, and Spain) were simultaneously admitted to the United Nations on 14 December 1955 (United Nations Security Council Resolution 109).

== Former members ==
=== Republic of China (1945–1971) ===
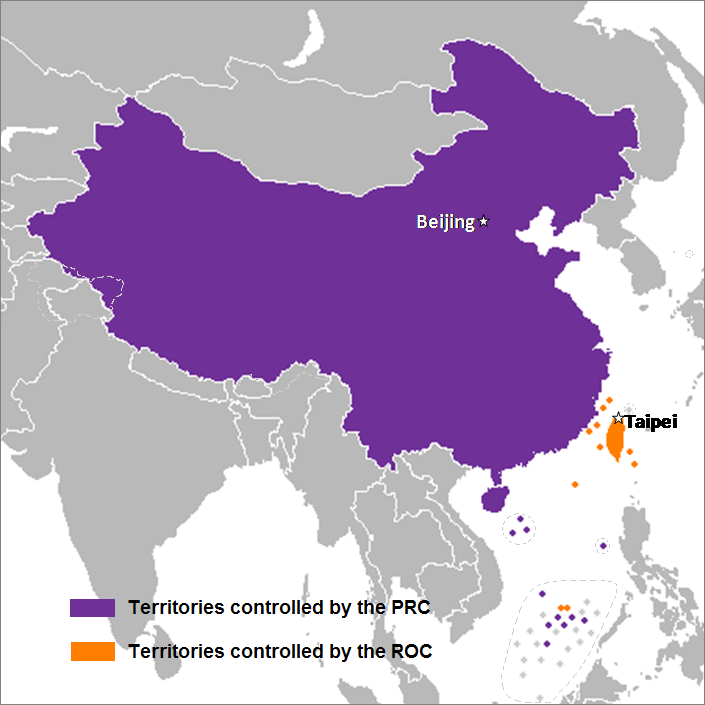
Areas controlled by the People's Republic of China and the Republic of China

The Republic of China (ROC) joined the UN as an original member on 24 October 1945, and as set out by the United Nations Charter, Chapter V, Article 23, became one of the five permanent members of the United Nations Security Council. In 1949, as a result of the Chinese Civil War, the Kuomintang-led ROC government lost effective control of mainland China and relocated to the island of Taiwan, and the Communist Party-led government of the People's Republic of China (PRC), declared on 1 October 1949, took control of mainland China. The UN was notified on 18 November 1949 of the formation of the Central People's Government of the People's Republic of China; however, the Government of the Republic of China continued to represent China at the UN, despite the small size of the ROC's jurisdiction of Taiwan and a number of smaller islands compared to the PRC's jurisdiction of mainland China. As both governments claimed to be the sole legitimate representative of China, proposals to effect a change in the representation of China in the UN were discussed but rejected for the next two decades. Both sides rejected compromise proposals to allow both states to participate in the UN, based on the One-China policy.

By the 1970s, a shift had occurred in international diplomatic circles and the PRC had gained the upper hand in international diplomatic relations and recognition count. On 25 October 1971, the 21st time the United Nations General Assembly debated on the PRC's admission into the UN, United Nations General Assembly Resolution 2758 was adopted, by which it recognized that "the representatives of the Government of the People's Republic of China are the only lawful representatives of China to the United Nations and that the People's Republic of China is one of the five permanent members of the Security Council," and decided "to restore all its rights to the People's Republic of China and to recognize the representatives of its Government as the only legitimate representatives of China to the United Nations, and to expel forthwith the representatives of Chiang Kai-shek from the place which they unlawfully occupy at the United Nations and in all the organizations related to it." This effectively transferred the seat of China in the UN, including its permanent seat on the Security Council, from the ROC to the PRC, and expelled the ROC from the UN.

The UN Secretary-General concluded from the resolution that the General Assembly considered the People's Republic China to be the only legitimate representative of China, and thus that submissions from Taiwan would "not be accepted".

==== Bids for readmission as the representative of Taiwan ====
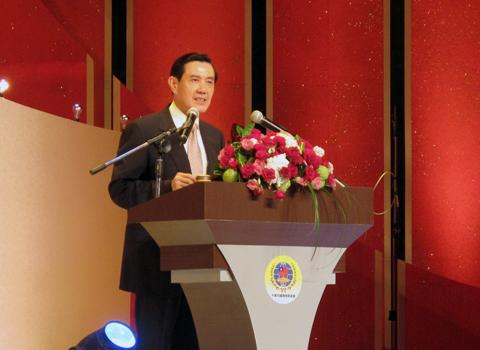
The presidency of Ma Ying-jeou saw the first participation of the Republic of China on a United Nations body in almost 40 years.

In 1993, the ROC began campaigning to rejoin the UN separately from the People's Republic of China. A number of options were considered, including seeking membership in the specialized agencies, applying for observer status, applying for full membership, or having resolution 2758 revoked to reclaim the seat of China in the UN.

Every year from 1993 to 2006, UN member states submitted a memorandum to the UN Secretary-General requesting that the UN General Assembly consider allowing the ROC to resume participating in the United Nations. (Note: Specific items include: United Nations General Assembly Session 48 Agenda item A/48/191 9 August 1993. Retrieved 18 April 2016. United Nations General Assembly Session 49 Agenda item A/49/144 19 July 1994. Retrieved 18 April 2016. United Nations General Assembly Session 50 Agenda item A/50/145 19 July 1995. Retrieved 18 April 2016. United Nations General Assembly Session 51 Agenda item A/51/142 18 July 1996. Retrieved 19 April 2016. United Nations General Assembly Session 52 Agenda item A/52/143 16 July 1997. Retrieved 19 April 2016. United Nations General Assembly Session 53 Agenda item A/53/145 8 July 1998. Retrieved 19 April 2016. United Nations General Assembly Session 54 Agenda item A/54/194 12 August 1999. Retrieved 20 April 2016. United Nations General Assembly Session 55 Agenda item A/55/227 4 August 2000. Retrieved 23 April 2016. United Nations General Assembly Session 56 Agenda item A/56/193 8 August 2001. Retrieved 23 April 2016. United Nations General Assembly Session 57 Agenda item A/57/191 20 August 2002. Retrieved 23 April 2016. United Nations General Assembly Session 58 Agenda item A/58/197 5 August 2003. Retrieved 23 April 2016. United Nations General Assembly Session 59 Agenda item A/59/194 10 August 2004. Retrieved 24 April 2016. United Nations General Assembly Session 60 Agenda item A/60/192 11 August 2005. Retrieved 24 April 2016. United Nations General Assembly Session 61 Agenda item A/61/194 11 August 2006. Retrieved 24 April 2016.) This approach was chosen, rather than a formal application for membership, because it could be enacted by the General Assembly, while a membership application would need Security Council approval, where the PRC held a veto. Early proposals recommended admitting the ROC with parallel representation over China, along with the People's Republic of China, pending eventual reunification, citing examples of other divided countries which had become separate UN member states, such as East and West Germany and North and South Korea. Later proposals emphasized that the ROC was a separate state, over which the PRC had no effective sovereignty. These proposed resolutions referred to the ROC under a variety of names: "Republic of China in Taiwan" (1993–1994), "Republic of China on Taiwan" (1995–1997, 1999–2002), "Republic of China" (1998), "Republic of China (Taiwan)" (2003), and "Taiwan" (2004–2006).

However, all fourteen attempts were unsuccessful as the General Assembly's General Committee declined to put the issue on the Assembly's agenda for debate, under strong opposition from the PRC.

While all these proposals were vague, requesting the ROC be allowed to participate in UN activities without specifying any legal mechanism, in 2007 the ROC submitted a formal application under the name "Taiwan" for full membership in the UN. However, the application was rejected by the United Nations Office of Legal Affairs citing General Assembly Resolution 2758, without being forwarded to the Security Council. Secretary-General of the United Nations Ban Ki-moon stated that:

The position of the United Nations is that the People's Republic of China is representing the whole of China as the sole and legitimate representative Government of China. The decision until now about the wish of the people in Taiwan to join the United Nations has been decided on that basis. The resolution (General Assembly Resolution 2758) that you just mentioned is clearly mentioning that the Government of China is the sole and legitimate Government and the position of the United Nations is that Taiwan is part of China.

Responding to the UN's rejection of its application, the ROC government has stated that Taiwan is not now nor has it ever been under the jurisdiction of the PRC, and that since General Assembly Resolution 2758 did not clarify the issue of Taiwan's representation in the UN, it does not prevent Taiwan's participation in the UN as an independent sovereign nation. The ROC government also criticized Ban for asserting that Taiwan is part of China and returning the application without passing it to the Security Council or the General Assembly, contrary to UN's standard procedure (Provisional Rules of Procedure of the Security Council, Chapter X, Rule 59). On the other hand, the PRC government, which has stated that Taiwan is part of China and firmly opposes the application of any Taiwan authorities to join the UN either as a member or an observer, praised that UN's decision "was made in accordance with the UN Charter and Resolution 2758 of the UN General Assembly, and showed the UN and its member states' universal adherence to the one-China principle". A group of UN member states put forward a draft resolution for that fall's UN General Assembly calling on the Security Council to consider the application.

The following year two referendums in Taiwan on the government's attempts to regain participation at the UN did not pass due to low turnout. That fall the ROC took a new approach, with its allies submitting a resolution requesting that the "Republic of China (Taiwan)" be allowed to have "meaningful participation" in the UN specialized agencies. Again the issue was not put on the Assembly's agenda. In 2009, the ROC chose not to bring the issue of its participation in the UN up for debate at the General Assembly for the first time since it began the campaign in 1993.

In May 2009, the Department of Health of the Republic of China was invited by the World Health Organization to attend the 62nd World Health Assembly as an observer under the name "Chinese Taipei". This was the ROC's first participation in an event organized by a UN-affiliated agency since 1971, as a result of the improved cross-strait relations since Ma Ying-jeou became the President of the Republic of China a year before.

The Republic of China is officially recognized by 11 UN member states and the Holy See. It maintains unofficial relations with around 60 nations, including the United States and Japan.

=== States that no longer exist ===
==== British Raj (1945–1947) ====
The British Raj was a founding member of the United Nations.

==== Czechoslovakia (1945–1992) ====
Czechoslovakia joined the United Nations as an original member on 24 October 1945. Upon the imminent dissolution of Czechoslovakia, in a letter dated 10 December 1992, its Permanent Representative informed the United Nations Secretary-General that the Czech and Slovak Federative Republic would cease to exist on 31 December 1992 and that the Czech Republic and Slovakia, as successor states, would apply for membership in the UN. Neither state sought sole successor state status. Both states were readmitted to the UN on 19 January 1993.

==== German Democratic Republic (1973–1990) ====
Both the Federal Republic of Germany (West Germany) and the German Democratic Republic (East Germany) were admitted to the UN on 18 September 1973. Through the accession of the East German federal states to the Federal Republic of Germany, effective from 3 October 1990, the territory of the German Democratic Republic became part of the Federal Republic of Germany. In a letter to the general secretary, the German Foreign Minister notified the UN about this unification and stated that the Federal Republic of Germany would subsequently assume its membership under the name Germany. Consequently, the Federal Republic of Germany continued being a member of the UN while the German Democratic Republic ceased to exist.

==== Tanganyika (1961–1964) and Zanzibar (1963–1964) ====
Tanganyika was admitted to the UN on 14 December 1961, and the Sultanate of Zanzibar was admitted to the UN on 16 December 1963. Following the ratification on 26 April 1964 of the Articles of Union between Tanganyika and the People's Republic of Zanzibar, the two states merged to form the single member "United Republic of Tanganyika and Zanzibar", with its name changed to the United Republic of Tanzania on 1 November 1964.

==== Soviet Union (1945–1991) ====
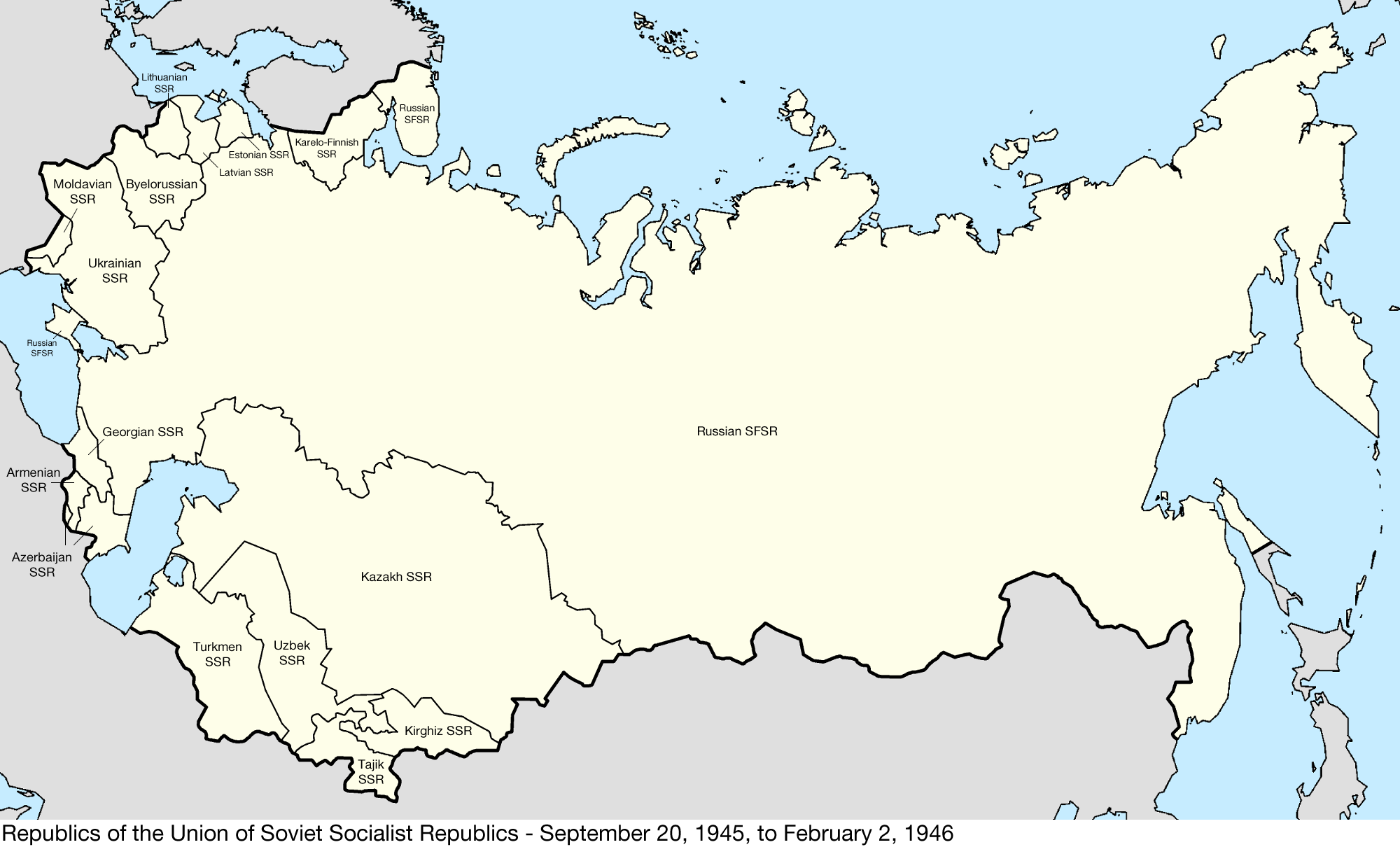
The USSR as its borders and republics were configured upon entry to the UN. Border changes and the dissolution of various republics happened over the course of its membership.

The Union of Soviet Socialist Republics (USSR) joined the UN as an original member on 24 October 1945, and as set out by the United Nations Charter, Chapter V, Article 23, became one of the five permanent members of the United Nations Security Council. Upon the imminent dissolution of the USSR, in a letter dated 24 December 1991, Boris Yeltsin, the President of the Russian Federation, informed the United Nations Secretary-General that the membership of the USSR in the Security Council and all other UN organs was being continued by the Russian Federation with the support of the 11 member states of the Commonwealth of Independent States.

The other fourteen independent states established from the former Soviet Republics were all admitted to the UN:

- The Byelorussian Soviet Socialist Republic and the Ukrainian Soviet Socialist Republic joined the UN on 24 October 1945 together with the USSR. After declaring independence, the Ukrainian Soviet Socialist Republic changed its name to Ukraine on 24 August 1991, and on 19 September 1991, the Byelorussian Soviet Socialist Republic informed the UN that it had changed its name to Belarus.
- Estonia, Latvia, and Lithuania were admitted to the UN on 17 September 1991, after regaining independence before the dissolution of the USSR. They do not consider themselves to have been legally represented by the Soviet Union during their occupation.
- Russia took over the Soviet Union's seat on 24 December 1991, after a letter by president Boris Yeltsin was received by then secretary-general Javier Pérez de Cuéllar.
- Armenia, Azerbaijan, Kazakhstan, Kyrgyzstan, the Republic of Moldova, Tajikistan, Turkmenistan, and Uzbekistan were admitted to the UN on 2 March 1992.
- Georgia was admitted to the UN on 31 July 1992.

==== United Arab Republic (1958–1961) ====
The United Arab Republic, including the occupied Gaza Strip

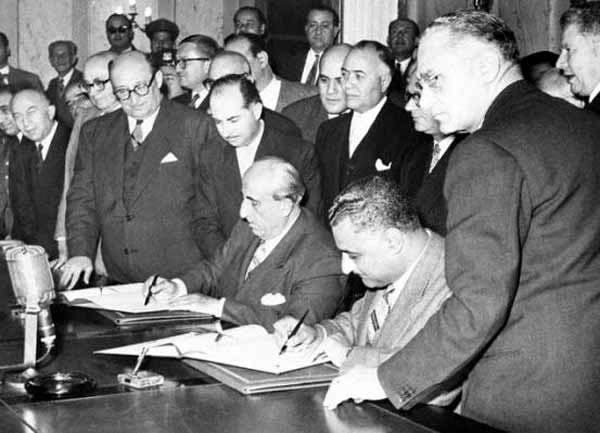
Egyptian president Gamal Abdel Nasser (seated right) and Syrian president Shukri al-Quwatli sign the accord to form the United Arab Republic in 1958. The political union briefly represented both states and was used as the name of Egypt following Syria's withdrawal in 1961.

Both Egypt and Syria joined the UN as original members on 24 October 1945. Following a plebiscite on 21 February 1958, the United Arab Republic was established by a union of Egypt and Syria and continued as a single member. On 13 October 1961, Syria, having regained its status as an independent state, resumed its separate membership in the UN. No objections were raised to Syria's return to membership in this manner. Egypt continued as a UN member under the name of the United Arab Republic, until it reverted to its original name on 2 September 1971. Syria changed its name to the Syrian Arab Republic on 14 September 1961.

==== Democratic Yemen (1967–1990) ====
Democratic Yemen (i.e., South Yemen) was admitted to the UN under the name People's Republic of South Yemen on 14 December 1967, with its name changed to the People's Democratic Republic of Yemen on 30 November 1970, and was later referred to as Democratic Yemen. On 22 May 1990, the state merged with the Yemen Arab Republic, which had been a member state since 1947, to form the Republic of Yemen, which continued as a single member under the name Yemen.

==== Yugoslavia / Serbia and Montenegro (1945–2006) ====
The Socialist Federal Republic of Yugoslavia disintegrated into several states starting in the early 1990s. By 2006, six UN member states existed in its former territory. Kosovo declared independence in 2008.

The Socialist Federal Republic of Yugoslavia, referred to as Yugoslavia, joined the UN as an original member on 24 October 1945. By 1992, it had been effectively dissolved into five independent states, which were all subsequently admitted to the UN:

- Bosnia and Herzegovina, Croatia, and Slovenia were admitted to the UN on 22 May 1992.
- North Macedonia was admitted to the UN on 8 April 1993, provisionally referred to for all purposes within the UN as "The former Yugoslav Republic of Macedonia" pending settlement of the dispute that had arisen over its name. On 13 February 2019, it notified the UN that it had officially changed its name, following a settlement with Greece, to the Republic of North Macedonia.
- The Federal Republic of Yugoslavia (name later changed to Serbia and Montenegro) was admitted to the UN on 1 November 2000.

Due to the dispute over its legal succession, the member state "Yugoslavia", referring to the former Socialist Federal Republic of Yugoslavia, remained on the official roster of UN members for many years after its effective dissolution, including the presence of the SFRY flag at UN headquarters. Following the admission of all five states as new UN members, "Yugoslavia" was removed from the official roster of UN members.

The government of the Federal Republic of Yugoslavia, established on 28 April 1992 by the remaining Yugoslav republics of Montenegro and Serbia, claimed itself as the legal successor state of the former Socialist Federal Republic of Yugoslavia; however, on 30 May 1992, United Nations Security Council Resolution 757 was adopted, by which it imposed international sanctions against the Federal Republic of Yugoslavia due to its role in the Yugoslav Wars, and noted that "the claim by the Federal Republic of Yugoslavia (Serbia and Montenegro) to continue automatically the membership of the former Socialist Federal Republic of Yugoslavia in the United Nations has not been generally accepted," which was reaffirmed on 19 September 1992 when United Nations Security Council Resolution 777 was adopted, by which it considered that "the state formerly known as the Socialist Federal Republic of Yugoslavia has ceased to exist." On 22 September 1992, United Nations General Assembly Resolution A/RES/47/1 was adopted, by which it considered that "the Federal Republic of Yugoslavia (Serbia and Montenegro) cannot continue automatically the membership of the former Socialist Federal Republic of Yugoslavia in the United Nations," and therefore decided that "the Federal Republic of Yugoslavia (Serbia and Montenegro) should apply for membership in the United Nations and that it shall not participate in the work of the General Assembly". For many years the Federal Republic of Yugoslavia refused to comply with the resolution, arguing that it was the legitimate successor to the Socialist Federal Republic of Yugoslavia and that the resolution and the sanctions were illegal and counted as a de facto expulsion of Yugoslavia from the UN. The UN itself deemed the resolution to not be an expulsion of Yugoslavia, since the former Socialist Federal Republic of Yugoslavia was still a member, albeit a member without a state to represent it. Since the UN did not consider the Federal Republic of Yugoslavia as the legal successor of the member-state "Yugoslavia," in the UN's judgment it had never been a member and so its earlier participation in the General Assembly had been illegal. Following the ousting of President Slobodan Milošević from office, the Federal Republic of Yugoslavia applied for membership, and was admitted to the UN on 1 November 2000. On 4 February 2003, it had its official name changed to Serbia and Montenegro, following the adoption and promulgation of the Constitutional Charter of Serbia and Montenegro by the Assembly of the Federal Republic of Yugoslavia.

On the basis of a referendum held on 21 May 2006, Montenegro declared independence from Serbia and Montenegro on 3 June 2006. In a letter dated on the same day, the President of Serbia informed the United Nations Secretary-General that the membership of Serbia and Montenegro in the UN was being continued by Serbia, following Montenegro's declaration of independence, in accordance with the Constitutional Charter of Serbia and Montenegro. Montenegro was admitted to the UN on 28 June 2006. Thus, Serbia and Montenegro's membership in the UN was inherited by Serbia, while Montenegro is a new state which had to obtain its own membership.

In the aftermath of the Kosovo War, the territory of Kosovo, then an autonomous province of the Federal Republic of Yugoslavia, was put under the interim administration of the United Nations Mission in Kosovo on 10 June 1999. On 17 February 2008 Kosovo declared independence, but this has not been recognised by Serbia. The Republic of Kosovo is not a member of the UN, but is a member of the International Monetary Fund and the World Bank Group, both specialized agencies in the United Nations System. The Republic of Kosovo has been recognised by 118 UN member states, including three of the five permanent members of the United Nations Security Council (France, the United Kingdom, and the United States); eight countries have suspended or withdrawn their recognition of Kosovo's independence, bringing the total to 110 out of 193 (57%) United Nations member states, as of December 2025. On 22 July 2010, the International Court of Justice, the primary judicial organ of the UN, issued an advisory opinion, ruling that Kosovo's declaration of independence was not in violation of international law.

== Suspension, expulsion and withdrawal of members ==
A member state may be suspended or expelled from the UN, according to the United Nations Charter. From Chapter II, Article 5:

A Member of the United Nations against which preventive or enforcement action has been taken by the Security Council may be suspended from the exercise of the rights and privileges of membership by the General Assembly upon the recommendation of the Security Council. The exercise of these rights and privileges may be restored by the Security Council.

From Article 6:

A Member of the United Nations which has persistently violated the Principles contained in the present Charter may be expelled from the Organization by the General Assembly upon the recommendation of the Security Council.

Since its inception, no member state has been suspended or expelled from the UN under Articles 5 or 6. However, in a few cases, states were suspended or expelled from participating in UN activities by means other than Articles 5 or 6:

- On 25 October 1971, United Nations General Assembly Resolution 2758 was adopted, which recognized the People's Republic of China instead of the Republic of China (since 1949 controlling only Taiwan) as the legitimate representative of China in the UN and effectively expelled the Republic of China from the UN in 1971 (see the section Former members: Republic of China). This act did not constitute as the expulsion of a member state under Article 6, as this would have required Security Council approval and been subjected to vetoes by its permanent members, which included the Republic of China itself and the United States, which at that time still recognized the Republic of China.
- In October 1974, the Security Council considered a draft resolution that would have recommended that the General Assembly immediately expel South Africa from the UN, in compliance with Article 6 of the United Nations Charter, due to its apartheid policies. However, the resolution was not adopted because of vetoes by three permanent members of the Security Council: France, the United Kingdom, and the United States. In response, the General Assembly decided to suspend South Africa from participation in the work of the Assembly's 29th session on 12 November 1974; however, South Africa was not formally suspended under Article 5. The suspension lasted until the General Assembly welcomed South Africa back to full participation in the UN on 23 June 1994, following its successful democratic elections earlier that year.
- On 28 April 1992, the new Federal Republic of Yugoslavia was established, by the remaining republics of Serbia and Montenegro of the former Socialist Federal Republic of Yugoslavia. On 22 September 1992, United Nations General Assembly Resolution A/RES/47/1 was adopted, by which it considered that "the Federal Republic of Yugoslavia (Serbia and Montenegro) cannot continue automatically the membership of the former Socialist Federal Republic of Yugoslavia in the United Nations," and therefore decided that "the Federal Republic of Yugoslavia (Serbia and Montenegro) should apply for membership in the United Nations and that it shall not participate in the work of the General Assembly". It did not apply for membership until Slobodan Milošević was ousted from the presidency and was admitted on 1 November 2000 (see the section Former members: Yugoslavia).

=== De facto withdrawal of Indonesia (1965–1966) ===
Indonesian president Sukarno's withdrawal in 1965 was the only time a UN member attempted to withdraw; it rejoined a year later.

Since the inception of the UN, only one member state (excluding those that dissolved or merged with other member states) has unilaterally attempted to withdraw from the UN. During the Indonesia–Malaysia confrontation, and in response to the election of Malaysia as a non-permanent member of the United Nations Security Council, in a letter dated 20 January 1965, Indonesia informed the United Nations Secretary-General that it had decided "at this stage and under the present circumstances" to withdraw from the UN. However, following the overthrow of President Sukarno, in a telegram dated 19 September 1966, Indonesia notified the Secretary-General of its decision "to resume full cooperation with the United Nations and to resume participation in its activities starting with the twenty-first session of the General Assembly". On 28 September 1966, the United Nations General Assembly took note of the decision of the Government of Indonesia and its President invited the representatives of that country to take their seats in the Assembly, with the UN effectively treating Indonesia's course of action as a "temporary cessation of cooperation" as opposed to a true withdrawal.

Unlike suspension and expulsion, no express provision is made in the United Nations Charter of whether or how a member can legally withdraw from the UN (largely to prevent the threat of withdrawal from being used as a form of political blackmail, or to evade obligations under the Charter, similar to withdrawals that weakened the UN's predecessor, the League of Nations), or on whether a request for readmission by a withdrawn member should be treated the same as an application for membership, i.e., requiring Security Council as well as General Assembly approval. Indonesia's return to the UN would suggest that this is not required; however, scholars have argued that the course of action taken by the General Assembly was not in accordance with the Charter from a legal point of view.

== Observers and non-members ==
=== Observers ===
In addition to the member states, there are two United Nations General Assembly non-member observer states: the Holy See and the State of Palestine.

- The Holy See holds sovereignty over the state of Vatican City and maintains diplomatic relations with 180 other states. It has been a United Nations General Assembly (UNGA) non-member observer state since 6 April 1964, and gained all the rights of full membership except voting on 1 July 2004.
- The Palestine Liberation Organization was granted observer status as a "non-member entity" on 22 November 1974. Acknowledging the proclamation of the State of Palestine by the Palestine National Council on 15 November 1988, the United Nations General Assembly decided that, effective as of 15 December 1988, the designation "Palestine" should be used in place of the designation "Palestine Liberation Organization" in the United Nations System. On 23 September 2011, Palestinian National Authority President Mahmoud Abbas submitted the application for UN membership for the State of Palestine to United Nations Secretary-General Ban Ki-moon; the application has not been voted on by the UN Security Council. On 31 October 2011, the General Assembly of UNESCO voted to admit Palestine as a member, becoming the first UN agency to admit Palestine as a full member. The State of Palestine was recognized as a United Nations General Assembly non-member observer state on 29 November 2012, when the UN General Assembly passed United Nations General Assembly resolution 67/19 by a vote of 138 to 9, with 41 abstentions. The change in status was described by The Independent as "de facto recognition of the sovereign state of Palestine". On 17 December 2012, then UN Chief of Protocol Yeocheol Yoon decided that "the designation of 'State of Palestine' shall be used by the Secretariat in all official United Nations documents". On 10 May 2024, the UN general assembly overwhelmingly passed a resolution which urged the Security Council to give "favourable consideration" to Palestine's request for membership. It also granted Palestine additional rights as an Observer State, including the right to sit in the general assembly among other states in alphabetical order, rather than in its current observer seat at the back of the chamber. However, the resolution also stated that "the state of Palestine, in its capacity as an observer state, does not have the right to vote in the general assembly or to put forward its candidature to United Nations organs." The assembly voted by 143 to nine, with 25 abstentions, for the resolution.

The Sovereign Military Order of Malta (not to be confused with the Republic of Malta, a UN member state), which is not a sovereign state but an entity, has observer status at the UN and maintains diplomatic relations with 113 countries.

A number of states were also granted observer status before being admitted to the UN as full members. The most recent case of an observer state becoming a member state was Switzerland, which was admitted in 2002.

The European Economic Community was granted observer status at the UNGA through Resolution 3208 in 1974. The Treaty of Lisbon in 2009 resulted in the delegates being accredited to its successor, the European Union. It was accorded full rights in the General Assembly, bar the right to vote and put forward candidates, via UNGA Resolution A/RES/65/276 on 3 May 2011. It is the only non-state party to over 50 multilateral conventions, and has participated in every way except for having a vote in a number of UN conferences.

=== Non-member states ===
The Cook Islands and Niue are both associated states of New Zealand, giving them a unique political status. While neither are member states of the UN, both are member states of specialized agencies of the UN such as WHO and UNESCO, and have had their "full treaty-making capacity" recognized by United Nations Secretariat in 1992 and 1994 respectively. They have since become parties to a number of international treaties for which the UN Secretariat acts as a depositary, such as the United Nations Framework Convention on Climate Change and the United Nations Convention on the Law of the Sea, and are treated as non-member states. Both the Cook Islands and Niue have expressed a desire to become a UN member state, but New Zealand has said that they would not support the application without a change in their constitutional relationship, in particular their right to New Zealand citizenship. In 2025, Cook Islands prime minister Mark Brown stated that the UN had confirmed that the Cook Islands did not meet the requirements for UN membership.

The sovereignty of Western Sahara is disputed between the Polisario Front's declared Sahrawi Arab Democratic Republic, which controls 30% of Western Sahara as its Free Zone, and Morocco, which occupies the remaining 70% of the territory. Western Sahara is listed by the UN as a non-self-governing territory. The Polisario Front is recognized by the UN as the legitimate representative of Western Sahara and is occasionally invited to speak as the territory's representative before the Special Committee on Decolonization.

Sovereignty over Kosovo is disputed between the Republic of Kosovo, which maintains diplomatic relations with over half of UN member states, and Serbia, which claims it as an autonomous province. As per United Nations Security Council Resolution 1244 and the ongoing dialogue on the political status of Kosovo, the Republic of Kosovo is not a member of the United Nations, however it is a member of two specialized agencies within the United Nations System: the International Monetary Fund and World Bank. It applied for UNESCO membership in 2015 but was unsuccessful.

The Republic of China (Taiwan) is not a member of the UN, as the People's Republic of China claims sovereignty over "Taiwan Province". See the discussion above in section Bids for readmission as the representative of Taiwan.

== See also ==
- Enlargement of the United Nations
- List of current permanent representatives to the United Nations
- Member states of the League of Nations
- Palestine 194
- United Nations list of non-self-governing territories
- High-Level Week of the 80th Session of the United Nations General Assembly 2025
