= List of international prime ministerial trips made by Tarique Rahman =

The following is a list of international prime ministerial trips made by Tarique Rahman as the prime minister of Bangladesh.

== 2026 ==
| | Country | Areas visited | Date(s) | Purpose | Notes | Images |
|---|---|---|---|---|---|---|
| 1 | Malaysia | Kuala Lumpur; Putrajaya | 21–22 June 2026 | State visit | See also: Bangladesh–Malaysia relations Details First foreign visit by Tarique Rahman as Prime Minister. | |
| 2 | China | Beijing; Dalian | 23–26 June 2026 | State visit | See also: Bangladesh–China relations Details First official visit to China by Tarique Rahman as Prime Minister. Held meetings with President Xi Jinping, Premier Li Qiang, and Chairman Zhao Leji. The two sides agreed to build a "China-Bangladesh community with a shared future in the new era" and signed 17 memorandums of understanding (MoUs). Discussions focused on reducing the trade deficit, diversifying Bangladeshi exports to China, infrastructure development under the Belt and Road Initiative, and establishing new foreign and defence dialogue mechanisms. Rahman also attended the 17th Annual Meeting of the New Champions 2026 (Summer Davos) in Dalian. | |
| 3 | United States | New York | 21–25 September 2026 | To attend the Eighty-first session of the United Nations General Assembly | See also: Bangladesh and the United Nations Details Tarique Rahman travelled to New York via Istanbul to attend the 81st session of the United Nations General Assembly, his first visit to the city as Prime Minister. On 22 September he attended a welcome breakfast hosted by UN Secretary-General António Guterres and a reception hosted by US President Donald Trump for leaders attending the session. On 24 September he delivered his maiden address to the General Debate, outlining his government's "3-R" strategy of Recovery, Restoration and Reconstruction and calling for the safe and dignified repatriation of Rohingya refugees to Myanmar. He also spoke at high-level events on climate action and sea-level rise, and at a Bangladesh-hosted event on the Rohingya crisis. On the sidelines, Rahman held bilateral meetings with Turkish President Recep Tayyip Erdoğan, Iranian President Masoud Pezeshkian, Pakistani Prime Minister Shehbaz Sharif, Croatian Prime Minister Andrej Plenković, Haitian Prime Minister Alix Didier Fils-Aimé, Bhutanese Prime Minister Tshering Tobgay and Thai Prime Minister Anutin Charnvirakul, as well as senior officials from the Maldives, Kuwait, the United Arab Emirates, Saudi Arabia and Sweden. He also met Guterres, World Bank Group President Ajay Banga and Gates Foundation CEO Mark Suzman, and attended a breakfast with Wall Street representatives hosted by JPMorgan Chase. During the visit, Biman Bangladesh Airlines signed an agreement with Boeing to purchase 11 aircraft. He left New York on 25 September and returned to Dhaka on 27 September. | |
| 4 | Japan | Tokyo | 26–29 October 2026 | State visit | See also: Bangladesh–Japan relations | |
| 5 | Turkey | Antalya | | To attend the 31st United Nations Climate Change Conference (COP31) | | |
