= Article 23 (disambiguation) =

Article 23 is an article of the Hong Kong Basic Law, which requires Hong Kong to pass national security legislation against splitting the country, subverting the central government, and colluding with external forces to interfere in internal affairs.

Article 23 may also refer to:

== Law ==
- Article 23 in Chapter V of the United Nations Charter, which establishes the composition of the Security Council
- Article 23 of the Basic Law for the Federal Republic of Germany, the provision used for German reunification
- Article 23 of the Constitution of India, prohibiting human trafficking and forced labour
- Article 23 of the Constitution of the Netherlands, regarding freedom of education

== Others ==
- Article 23, a 1998 novel by William R. Forstchen

== See also ==
- Section 23 (disambiguation)
