= Lebanon and the United Nations =

Lebanese Republic

United Nations membership
- Membership: Full member
- Since: 24 October 1945
- UNSC seat: Non-permanent
- Permanent Representative: Amal Mudallali

The Lebanese Republic is one of the 51 founding members of the United Nations when it signed the United Nations Conference on International Organization in 1945.

Lebanon has played the role and has participated as a non-permanent member in the Security Council between 1953 and 2010. The United Nations system within Lebanon joins forces to provide a tailor-made accurate and beneficial response to Lebanon's development and humanitarian challenges.

== Overview ==
Lebanon participated in the United Nations Conference on International Organization in June 1945 during the closing months of World War II and signed the United Nations Charter helping the way for the establishment of the United Nations. On 29 November 1947, Lebanon was among 13 states that rejected the United Nations Partition Plan for Palestine which later established the Jewish state known as Israel in May 1948 though Lebanon does not recognize as such. The country has been subjected to 44 UN resolutions.

Within the UN, Lebanon is continuously developing programs and operations in collaboration with the government and its partners, while taking into account the uniqueness of the Lebanese situation. Combined with the Syrian Civil War that has impacted on Lebanon, which led to the creation of the Lebanon Crisis Response Plan (LCRP) and planned to raise $1.2 billion for the vulnerable communities. The LCRP implementation means a more stable Lebanon and a peaceful coexistence between the Lebanese host and vulnerable communities

In June 2020, Amal Mudallali, Lebanon's permanent representative to the United Nations, became one of the vice presidents of the General Assembly after Lebanon was voted to the position.

== See also ==
- List of United Nations resolutions relating to Lebanon
