= Federated States of Micronesia and the United Nations =

Federated States of Micronesia

United Nations membership
- Membership: Full member
- Since: September 17, 1991
- UNSC seat: Non-permanent
- Ambassador: Jane J. Chigiyal

The Federated States of Micronesia joined the United Nations on September 17, 1991, five years after obtaining its independence from the United States of America. Since December 2011, its ambassador to the United Nations has been Jane J. Chigiyal. Although de jure sovereign, the F.S. Micronesia is bound by a Compact of Free Association with the United States, which provides it with "substantial financial support".

In 2015, Micronesia voted to condemn the US embargo over Cuba. The motion at the United Nations was supported by 191 member states, with two votes against (the United States and Israel) and no country abstaining.

In December 2017, Micronesia was one of just nine countries (including the United States and Israel) to vote against a motion adopted by the United Nations General Assembly condemning the United States' recognition of Jerusalem as the capital of Israel. The United States government had threatened to cut aid to states voting in favour of the motion.

Micronesia's priority within the United Nations is to highlight issues relating to climate change, and its impact on small island states.

== See also ==
- Trust Territory of the Pacific Islands
- Federated States of Micronesia–United States relations
- Israel–Micronesia relations
- United States and the United Nations
- Marshall Islands and the United Nations
