= Vietnam and the United Nations =

Relations between Vietnam and the United Nations

Socialist Republic of Vietnam

United Nations membership
- Membership: Full member
- Since: 20 September 1977; 49 years ago
- UNSC seat: Non-permanent
- Permanent Representative: Đỗ Hùng Việt

The Socialist Republic of Vietnam has been a member state of the United Nations since 20 September 1977, when the General Assembly admitted the Socialist Republic of Vietnam as the organization's 149th member. Applications by the State of Vietnam and later the Republic of Vietnam were blocked by Soviet vetoes in the 1950s, and the United States vetoed Vietnamese membership in 1975 and 1976 before dropping its objection in 1977.

Vietnam has served as a non-permanent member of the Security Council in 2008–2009 and 2020–2021, and it was elected to the Human Rights Council for 2014–2016, 2023–2025 and 2026–2028. It has contributed personnel to UN peacekeeping since 2014, and in October 2025 it hosted the signing ceremony of the United Nations Convention against Cybercrime in Hanoi. In 2006, Vietnam was one of eight countries that volunteered to pilot the "Delivering as One" reform of UN country operations.

== History ==
=== Early applications ===
On 19 September 1952, the Security Council voted on French proposals to admit the State of Vietnam, Laos and Cambodia. Each proposal received ten votes in favour but was rejected because the Soviet Union, a permanent member, voted against it. A Soviet proposal to admit the Democratic Republic of Vietnam was defeated at the same meeting by ten votes to one.

In December 1955, during the negotiations that led to the admission of sixteen states, the United States voted for a Republic of China amendment that proposed the admission of Vietnam and South Korea. The State Department told its embassy in Saigon that Vietnam had been kept out only by the Soviet veto. In February 1957, General Assembly resolution 1017 (XI) noted that South Korea and Vietnam had been excluded by the opposition of one permanent member, declared both fully qualified and asked the Security Council to reconsider. The Council failed to adopt any proposal on their admission on 9 September 1957. On 9 December 1958, a draft recommending the admission of South Vietnam received eight votes in favour, one against and two abstentions, but it was not adopted because the negative vote came from a permanent member. In September 1960, the State Department noted that the Soviet Union had repeatedly vetoed the application of the South Vietnamese government and expected no favourable Council action that year.

=== Vietnam War ===
From August 1964, Secretary-General U Thant tried through US ambassador Adlai Stevenson to arrange private talks in Rangoon between North Vietnamese and American representatives. On 31 January 1966, US ambassador Arthur Goldberg asked for an urgent Council meeting on Vietnam and submitted a draft resolution calling for talks on applying the 1954 and 1962 Geneva accords. The Council placed the question on its agenda on 2 February 1966, but it then adjourned for informal consultations on how to proceed.

=== Vetoes after the war ===
By July 1975, the governments in Hanoi and Saigon had both applied for membership. US ambassador Daniel Patrick Moynihan objected to a veto, arguing that most members would see it as vindictive, while State Department officials said that the American priority was the admission of South Korea rather than the exclusion of Vietnam. The United States vetoed the admission of both Vietnamese governments on 11 August 1975. After the General Assembly voted 123 to 0, with 8 abstentions, on 19 September 1975 to ask the Council to reconsider, the United States vetoed the applications again on 30 September.

On 15 November 1976, the Council voted 14 to 1 on the application of the Socialist Republic of Vietnam, with the United States casting a veto. The United States said that it doubted Vietnam's willingness to meet its obligations under the Charter because of its handling of American servicemen missing in action. The General Assembly then voted 124 to 1, with 3 abstentions, to recommend that the Council reconsider the application.

=== Admission ===
In July 1977, the United States agreed to drop its veto after Vietnam undertook in talks in Paris earlier that year to give a fuller accounting of missing American servicemen. Washington asked that the application be approved without a formal ballot, which UN sources said would spare it from voting in favour of its former enemy. On 20 July 1977, the Security Council adopted resolution 413, which recommended that the General Assembly admit Vietnam. The Assembly admitted Vietnam on 20 September 1977 in resolution 32/2, at the same meeting at which it admitted Djibouti in resolution 32/1. Vietnam thus became the 149th member of the organization. The Vietnamese delegation was led by Deputy Prime Minister and Foreign Minister Nguyễn Duy Trinh, and in the debate that followed the Soviet representative described the decision as "redressing a historic injustice".

== Security Council ==
=== 2008–2009 term ===
On 16 October 2007, the General Assembly elected Vietnam to the Security Council for the first time, with 178 of 190 valid ballots in the first round, for a two-year term beginning on 1 January 2008. Vietnam held the Council presidency in July 2008, when the Council held open debates on children and armed conflict and on the Middle East and adopted six resolutions and three presidential statements. During its second presidency in October 2009, Deputy Prime Minister and Foreign Minister Phạm Gia Khiêm chaired an open debate on women, peace and security at which the Council unanimously adopted resolution 1889.

=== 2020–2021 term ===
On 7 June 2019, the General Assembly elected Vietnam for a second term in 2020–2021 with 192 of 193 valid ballots. Vietnam held the presidency in January 2020, when Deputy Prime Minister and Foreign Minister Phạm Bình Minh chaired a debate marking the 75th anniversary of the UN Charter. The Council adopted a presidential statement at that meeting calling on member states to comply fully with the purposes and principles of the Charter. Vietnam's programme that month also included a briefing on cooperation between the UN and the Association of Southeast Asian Nations (ASEAN).

During Vietnam's second presidency in April 2021, Foreign Minister Bùi Thanh Sơn chaired an open debate on mine action on 8 April, and President Nguyễn Xuân Phúc chaired a debate on regional organizations on 19 April. Both debates ended with the adoption of presidential statements. On 27 April 2021, after a debate chaired by Bùi Thanh Sơn, the Council unanimously adopted resolution 2573 on the protection of objects indispensable to the survival of civilian populations.

== Economic and Social Council ==
Vietnam served on the Economic and Social Council from 1998 to 2000. On 21 October 2015, the General Assembly elected it for a second term in 2016–2018 with 182 of 187 valid votes.

== Human Rights Council ==
On 12 November 2013, the General Assembly elected Vietnam to the Human Rights Council for 2014–2016 with 184 of 192 votes. Rights activists criticized the election, and Phil Robertson of Human Rights Watch said that he had seen no sign that Hanoi planned to change its policies. On 11 October 2022, Vietnam won a second term for 2023–2025 with 145 votes, while South Korea failed to win re-election in the same Asia-Pacific contest. A joint statement by groups including Human Rights Watch, Amnesty International and Article 19 said that Vietnam needed to release detained journalists and rights defenders to become a credible member of the council. On 14 October 2025, Vietnam was re-elected for 2026–2028 with 180 votes, the highest total in the Asia-Pacific group.

Vietnam's fourth review under the Universal Periodic Review took place in Geneva on 7 May 2024. Before the review, Human Rights Watch reported that more than 160 people were imprisoned in Vietnam for criticizing the government. When the council adopted the outcome on 27 September 2024, Vietnamese media reported that Vietnam had accepted 271 of the 320 recommendations it received.

== Peacekeeping ==
Vietnam first provided personnel to UN peacekeeping in 2014. The Ministry of National Defence decided on 25 November 2014 to establish a level-2 field hospital, and the first group of its 70 staff left from Ho Chi Minh City for Bentiu in the UN Mission in South Sudan (UNMISS) in October 2018. Under-Secretary-General Jean-Pierre Lacroix called the hospital "essential to the success of the mission".

Vietnamese engineering units have served with the UN Interim Security Force for Abyei (UNISFA) since 2022, and seven rotations of the field hospital had served in South Sudan by May 2026. In April 2026, Vietnam registered seven types of units, including mechanized infantry, transport helicopter and airfield support units, in the UN Peacekeeping Capability Readiness System. Việt Nam News reported that nearly 1,400 Vietnamese officers and personnel, including 32 police officers, had been deployed to UN missions and offices since 2014. On 22 September 2026, the eighth field hospital rotation and the fifth engineering unit left Hanoi for UNMISS and UNISFA.

== Cambodia and Indochinese refugees ==
=== Cambodia ===
After Vietnam's intervention in Cambodia in December 1978, the Security Council met in January 1979 in response to a telegram from Democratic Kampuchea. On 15 January 1979, the Soviet Union vetoed a draft resolution that received 13 votes in favour and 2 against. In November 1979, the General Assembly adopted resolution 34/22 by 91 votes to 21, with 29 abstentions, calling for the immediate withdrawal of all foreign forces from Cambodia, and Vietnam voted against it. In October 1980, the Assembly rejected a Vietnamese challenge to the credentials of the Pol Pot delegation by 74 votes to 35, with 32 abstentions. It also adopted an ASEAN proposal calling for an international conference to press for the withdrawal of Vietnamese troops.

Vietnam announced in April 1989 that it would withdraw its troops from Cambodia, and in September 1989 it said that the withdrawal had been completed. The settlement plan that led to the Paris Agreements of 23 October 1991 was accepted by all Cambodian parties and by Vietnam. In February 1992, the Security Council authorized the United Nations Transitional Authority in Cambodia.

=== Refugees ===
In May 1979, the Office of the UN High Commissioner for Refugees (UNHCR) and Vietnam signed an agreement in Geneva to set up the Orderly Departure Programme as a legal alternative to flight by boat. By the time its family reunification work passed to the International Organization for Migration in 1991, the programme had helped more than 330,000 people to emigrate. In 1989, about 70 governments adopted the Comprehensive Plan of Action, which introduced screening to decide which boat people qualified as refugees under the 1951 Refugee Convention. When the plan ended in 1996, Vietnam agreed to take back those who had been screened out, and about 110,000 rejected asylum seekers were eventually returned.

== Law of the sea ==
Vietnam ratified the United Nations Convention on the Law of the Sea (UNCLOS) on 25 July 1994. On 6 May 2009, Malaysia and Vietnam made a joint submission to the Commission on the Limits of the Continental Shelf, which drew communications from China and the Philippines among others. In a note verbale of 30 March 2020, Vietnam rejected Chinese claims to historic rights in the South China Sea and to straight baselines around the Paracel and Spratly Islands, and it described UNCLOS as the sole legal basis for maritime entitlements. In July 2024, Vietnam filed its third extended continental shelf submission, covering the central area of the South China Sea, about a month after the Philippines made a similar submission.

== Disarmament and treaties ==
Vietnam deposited its instrument of ratification of the Comprehensive Nuclear-Test-Ban Treaty on 10 March 2006, becoming the 34th of the 44 states whose ratification is needed for the treaty to enter into force. It ratified the Treaty on the Prohibition of Nuclear Weapons on 17 May 2018 as its tenth state party.

On 25 October 2025, the United Nations Convention against Cybercrime, which the General Assembly had adopted in December 2024, opened for signature at a ceremony in Hanoi. The ceremony was hosted by the Vietnamese government with the United Nations Office on Drugs and Crime, and 71 states and the European Union signed the convention there over 25 and 26 October. Rights groups described the treaty's safeguards as weak, and Deborah Brown of Human Rights Watch said that Vietnamese authorities routinely used laws to censor and silence online criticism of the leadership.

== Other roles ==
On 3 November 2016, the General Assembly elected Nguyễn Hồng Thao of Vietnam to the International Law Commission with 120 votes for a term from 2017 to 2021. He was re-elected on 12 November 2021 with 145 votes. On 7 December 2020, the Assembly adopted without a vote a resolution introduced by Vietnam's permanent representative Đặng Đình Quý that proclaimed 27 December as the International Day of Epidemic Preparedness. At the 2021 United Nations Climate Change Conference, Prime Minister Phạm Minh Chính announced a target of net-zero emissions by 2050.

== UN presence in Vietnam ==
UNICEF began working in Vietnam in 1975 as the first UN agency to open an office in the country after the war. The partnership between the United Nations Development Programme (UNDP) and the Vietnamese government began in 1978, when the UNDP opened an office in Hanoi. According to the Vietnam News Agency, UN aid to Vietnam exceeded US$500 million between 1977 and 1986, and it made up nearly 60 per cent of aid from outside the socialist countries by the late 1980s. In 1990, Vietnam became the first country in Asia and the second in the world to ratify the Convention on the Rights of the Child.

Vietnam's "Delivering as One" pilot pooled the work of UN agencies through One Plan, One Budget, One Leader, One Set of Management Practices, One Voice and a shared Green One UN House. On 22 May 2015, Secretary-General Ban Ki-moon and Phạm Bình Minh inaugurated the Green One UN House in Hanoi, which brought UN organizations from ten locations in the city into one renovated building. On 5 July 2017, the government and the UN signed a One Strategic Plan for 2017–2021 that involved 18 UN agencies and had an estimated budget of US$423 million. It was followed by a cooperation framework for sustainable development, signed in Hanoi on 11 August 2022, whose priorities include social development, climate change and governance. Pauline Tamesis has served as UN Resident Coordinator in Vietnam since 18 June 2022.

== See also ==
- Foreign relations of Vietnam
- Member states of the United Nations
- Enlargement of the United Nations
