= Trinidad and Tobago and the United Nations =

Trinidad and Tobago

United Nations membership
- Represented by: Trinidad and Tobago (1962–present)
- Membership: Full member
- Since: 18 September 1962
- UNSC seat: Non-permanent
- Permanent Representative: Rodney Charles

Trinidad and Tobago was admitted to the United Nations by the General Assembly on September 18, 1962, as advised by the United Nations Security Council Resolution 175.

Several United Nations organisations are physically based in Trinidad and Tobago including:

- Economic Commission for Latin America and the Caribbean (ECLAC) (Caribbean Office)
- International Labour Organization (ILO) (Caribbean Office)
- Joint United Nations Programme on HIV/AIDS (UNAIDS) (Caribbean Office)
- United Nations Information Centre (UNIC) (Caribbean Office)

Trinidad and Tobago was one of the strong state supporters for founding the creation of the U.N. International Criminal Court. To date it has had two judges which have served on the ICC including Judge Karl Hudson-Phillips from (2003–2007), and Judge Anthony Carmona from (2012–2013).

== See also ==
- United Nations Security Council Resolution 175
