= Section 23 =

Section 23 may refer to:

- Section23 Films, an American multimedia distributor
- Section 23 of the Canadian Charter of Rights and Freedoms, which guarantee minority language educational rights to French-speaking communities outside Quebec
- Section 23 of the Constitution of Australia
- Section 23 of the Indian Penal Code, definition of "wrongful gain" and "wrongful loss"

== See also ==
- Article 23 (disambiguation)
