= Expulsion from the United Nations =

Procedure under UN Charter Chapter II

A country can be expelled from the United Nations (UN) if it is determined that it has persistently violated the principles of the UN Charter, which is obligatory upon every UN member. The conditions and due process for expulsion fall under Article VI of Chapter II of the UN Charter. Separately, Article V outlines suspension of membership (though not expulsion) through the same procedure.

To date, no country with UN membership has ever been formally expelled from the organization. However, past motions by the General Assembly in October 1971 and November 1974 yielded similar consequences for the Republic of China and the Republic of South Africa, respectively—as the former's membership was replaced by the People's Republic of China following Resolution 2758; and the latter's membership was suspended by a vote due to apartheid.

== History ==
=== League of Nations precedent ===
Under the League of Nations (1920–1946), no country's membership was revoked except for that of the Soviet Union, which was expelled for invading Finland in 1939. However, the organization itself would be dissolved and replaced by the UN at the end of World War II.

=== United Nations membership challenges ===
There has not been an incident since the establishment of the UN in which a country that holds membership has been expelled by a dedicated formal process, although at least two expulsion attempts were initiated by Tanzania against South Africa in 1974 and by Jordan against Israel in 1982. Neither attempt was successful, but South Africa was suspended between 1974 and 1994, when apartheid was abolished.

==== The "two Chinas" dispute ====
After the Chinese Civil War and the retreat of the government of Republic of China to Taiwan, the PRC lobbied for the exclusion of the Republic of China from the UN. Particularly, in 1971 the PRC through its proxies passed along a letter from its Ministry of Foreign Affairs stating that Taiwan was a part of its territory that was returned after World War II, and that Beijing would "have absolutely nothing to do with the [UN]" if it adopted a position of "'two Chinas', 'one China, one Taiwan,' or 'the status of Taiwan remaining to be determined'". This claim was reiterated again during debates in the UN General Assembly. At the time, it was viewed as a question of representation (of which government should represent China in the UN) rather than a question of admission of the PRC. Eventually, the Republic of China was stripped of its 26-year-long UN membership and replaced by the PRC in the UN Security Council. The expulsion occurred despite the fact that the Republic of China had been one of the founding members of the UN, with diplomatic recognition of other UN members. Nonetheless, the mention of the Republic of China rather than People's Republic of China among Security Council members in the UN Charter has been retained since.

== Proposed expulsions ==
=== Russian Federation (2022) ===
After the Russian invasion of Ukraine in 2022 and adoption of General Assembly Resolution ES-11/1, the presence of Russia in the UN Security Council has been questioned. Although the membership of the Soviet Union, whose legal status Russia inherited, is enshrined in Article 23 of the UN Charter and its veto power cannot be revoked because of Article 27 of the Charter, some have argued that Russia could not veto a resolution proposing its expulsion under Article 6 of the Charter because Article 27 obliges members of the Security Council to abstain from voting in certain disputes to which they are a party. That provision, however, only applies to decisions of the Security Council under Chapter VI and Article 52(3) of the Charter, not to expulsions. Since Russia would presumably veto its own expulsion, the issue of any potential expulsion of Russia from the UN is therefore moot.

=== State of Israel (2024) ===
On 4 November 2024, Malaysia stated that it would seek legal proceedings to have Israel expelled from the UN amidst the Gaza war.

== See also ==
- Withdrawal from the United Nations
