= Poland and the United Nations =

Republic of Poland

United Nations membership
- Represented by: Provisional Government of National Unity (1945–1947); Republic of Poland (1947–1952); Polish People's Republic (1952–1989); Republic of Poland (1989–present)
- Membership: Full member
- Since: 24 October 1945
- UNSC seat: Non-permanent
- Permanent Representative: Krzysztof Szczerski

Poland is one of the 51 original members of the United Nations that signed the United Nations Charter on 15 October 1945 and the Declaration by United Nations on 1 January 1942. Since joining the world body, Poland contributes to the United Nations such as peacekeeping missions, with several Polish officers put in charge of thousands of troops forming international contingents in Lebanon and the Golan Heights. In addition, Poland sat on the United Nations Security Council as a non-permanent member six times (1946–1947, 1960, 1970–1971, 1982–1983, 1996–1997, 2018–2019).

== Historical background ==
Poland signed the Declaration by United Nations in 1942. Despite the aggression during World War II, Joseph Stalin invited the Provisional Government of Poland to participate in the United Nations Conference on International Organization in San Francisco in June 1945. However, no delegation had been invited from Poland. The Polish pianist Artur Rubinstein was present, as he was to perform at the opening concert, and he noticed this immediately: he began the concert by stating his deep disappointment that the conference did not have a delegation from Poland. Rubinstein later described becoming overwhelmed by a blind fury and angrily pointing out to the public the absence of the Polish flag. (See article: Poland Is Not Yet Lost for more information.)

== Activities in the United Nations ==
=== Peacekeeping ===
As of 2021, more than 150,000 soldiers from the Polish Armed Forces have taken part in UN peacekeeping missions.

=== United Nations Conferences ===
Since August 1995, the United Nations Information Centre in Warsaw has been raising public awareness of the UN's work. Poland has hosted a number of UN conferences, including the issues on climate change in Poznań (2008) and Warsaw (2013).
