= Chapter II of the United Nations Charter =

UN charter articles concerning membership

Chapter II of the United Nations Charter deals with membership to the United Nations (UN) organization. Membership is open to the original signatories and "all other peace-loving states" that accept the terms and obligations set forth in the UN Charter and, "in the judgment of the Organization, are able and willing to carry out these obligations". According to Chapter II of the UN Charter, in order to be admitted to the UN, a country must first be recommended by the UN Security Council and then approved by a vote of the UN General Assembly. In addition, the admission must not be opposed by any of the five permanent members of the UN Security Council (China, France, Russia, the United Kingdom, and the United States), sometimes referred to as the Permanent Five or P5.

Admission to membership in the UN is regarded as an important indicator of sovereignty and legitimate statehood, especially for microstates. Some states have governments that are unofficially recognized as independent, such as the Republic of China on Taiwan, but have not been admitted to the UN due to a veto by a P5 member. During the Cold War, the United States and Soviet Union did not allow rival blocs to be admitted to the UN. When they began letting those countries join, it led to a period of great expansion of UN membership, especially as the number of colonies gaining independence increased.

Chapter II also provides for the suspension and expulsion of member states, and for the restoration of rights, by the UN General Assembly upon recommendation from the UN Security Council. The government of the Republic of China (ROC) has questioned the legality of UN General Assembly Resolution 2758, which declared the People's Republic of China as the legitimate holder of the Chinese seat, since the resolution expelled the ROC delegation without a recommendation initiated by the UN Security Council (of which the ROC was a founding member). In 2005, Israel called for Iran to be expelled from the UN based on the position that Iran had "persistently violated" the principles of the UN Charter by calling for Israel's destruction, thus meeting the criteria for expulsion defined in Chapter II, Article 6.
