= Bangladesh and the United Nations =

People's Republic of Bangladesh

United Nations membership
- Membership: Full member
- Since: 17 September 1974
- UNSC seat: Non-permanent
- Permanent Representative: Irene Khan

Bangladesh and the United Nations have a strong relationship. Bangladesh is one of the largest troop contributing countries in the world.

== Diplomatic representation ==
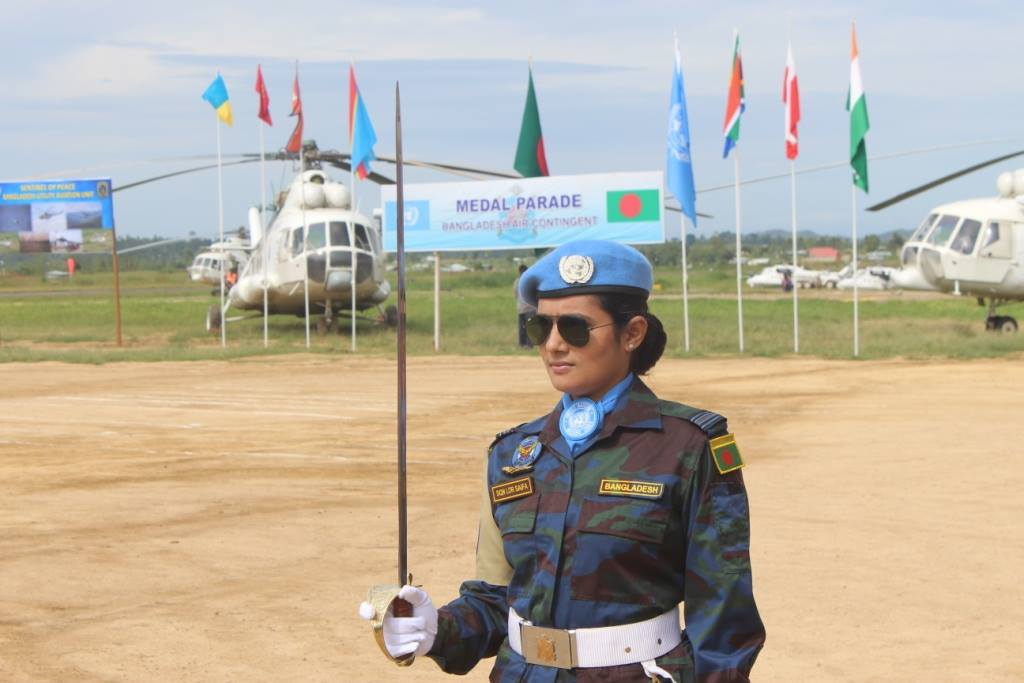
Guard of Honour

Bangladesh is represented in the United Nations Headquarters, New York City, by the Permanent Mission of Bangladesh to the United Nations which is headed by the Permanent Representative of Bangladesh to the United Nations. Rabab Fatima is the present Permanent representative of Bangladesh to the United Nation. Permanent Mission of Bangladesh to the United Nations in Geneva represents the interest of Bangladesh to United Nations organs based in Geneva. Bangladesh is represented in Vienna by the Permanent Mission of Bangladesh to the United Nations in Vienna.

Bangladesh has been unanimously elected a member of the UN Commission on the Status of Women for a four-year term from 2024 to 2028.

== History ==
The United Nations and its agencies bought relief to Bangladesh in 1971 during the Bangladesh Liberation War. The United Nations established the United Nations East Pakistan Relief Operation (UNEPRO) on 17 July 1971. The operation was headed by John R Kelly at the beginning and later he was replaced by Paul Mckee Henry. The UN provided aid to Bangladeshi refugees of the war. During the 26th session of the General Assembly of the United Nation, the Provisional Government of Bangladesh sent an envoy to United Nations on 21 September 1971. In October 1971, a Bangladeshi representative spoke at the UN Plaza and declared the "point of no return" had been reached in the Bangladesh Liberation war against Humanity.

On 16 November 1971, the operation was completely taken over by the United Nations from the civil administration of East Pakistan due to mismanagement. This harmed the morale of civil servants in the East Pakistan administration. Bangladesh had the first official delegate to the UN on 4 December 1971. The World Health Organization, UNICEF, and World Food Programme provided aid to the refugees. After the independence of Bangladesh on 16 December 1971, the United Nations created United Nations Relief Operations in Dhaka (UNROD) on 21 December 1971 and was managed by Robert Jackson, which was upgraded to United Nations Relief Operations in Bangladesh (UNROB). The operation was ended on 31 December 1973.

The Secretary-General of the United Nations, Kurt Waldheim, visited Bangladesh on 9 January 1973. The United Nations provided support for rebuilding facilities like the Chalna Port (renamed to Mongla Port) after it was damaged in the Bangladesh Liberation war. The UN helped repatriate Bengalis who were detained in Pakistan to Bangladesh in 1973. Bangladesh's bid for membership in the United Nations in 1972 failed due to China's veto on behalf of Pakistan. China withdrew its objection after the normalisation of relations between Pakistan and Bangladesh, enabling Bangladesh to become a full member of the United Nations on 17 September 1974. Sheikh Mujibur Rahman, the president of Bangladesh, gave a speech in the Bengali language at the General Assembly on 25 September 1974.

In 1975, Bangladesh was elected vice-president of the General Assembly of the United Nations. From 1976 to 1978, it also on several terms served as an elected member of the United Nations Economic and Social Council (ECOSOC) latest being for the term 2020–2022. In 1979, Bangladesh was elected to the United Nations Security Council. As a member of the security council, Bangladesh voted against the Soviet Union invasion of Afghanistan, criticized Israeli settlements, and called for the return of American hostages from Iran. From 1980 to 1982, Osman Ghani Khan then CAG of Bangladesh elected as Chairman of the United Nations Board of Auditors for two successive terms. In 1980, Bangladesh served as the Coordinator of the Least Developed Countries. Bangladesh served another term in ECOSOC from 1981 to 1983. From 1982 to 1983, Bangladesh was the Chairman of the Group of 77. In 1985, Bangladesh was elected, for the first time, to the United Nations High Commissioner for Refugees. From 1983 to 2000, Bangladesh served as a member of the Human Rights Commission. In 1985, Abu Sayeed Chowdhury, former President of Bangladesh, was made the head of the United Nations Commission on Human Rights.

Humayun Rashid Choudhury, a former Foreign Minister of Bangladesh, was elected as President of the United Nations General Assembly during its 41st session between 1986 and 1987. Bangladesh was elected to the Security Council again in 2000 and from March 2000 to June 2001 served as the President of the Security Council. Bangladesh was the Chairman of the Committee Concerning Sierra Leone during its tenure at the Security Council. During the same period, Bangladesh was also the Chairman of the Working Committee on the Role of Sanctions. From 2006 to 2008, Bangladesh served in the United Nations Commission on Human Rights. Bangladesh joined the Peace Building Commission as a founding member.

Bangladesh was elected to the United Nations Human Rights Council on 13 October 2018. It was elected for a term of three years from 2019 to 2021. Bangladesh received 178 votes in the election to the council. Bangladesh had previously served three terms in the United Nations Human Rights Council.

== Peacekeeping ==
Bangladesh UN Peacekeeping Force is one of the largest contingent force of the United Nations and in December 2017 it had 7246 personal deployed in peacekeeping operations. Bangladesh first sent its soldiers to peacekeeping operations in 1988. Bangladesh peacekeepers have been deployed in a number of countries such as East Timor, Lebanon, South Sudan, Namibia, Haiti, Liberia, etc. Since 1988 to 2017, over 150 thousand Bangladeshi soldiers have participated in UN peacekeeping. from 1988 to 2017, 135 soldiers were killed in peacekeeping operations. In 2017, Bangladesh provided the third largest number of personnel from Asia to United Nation.

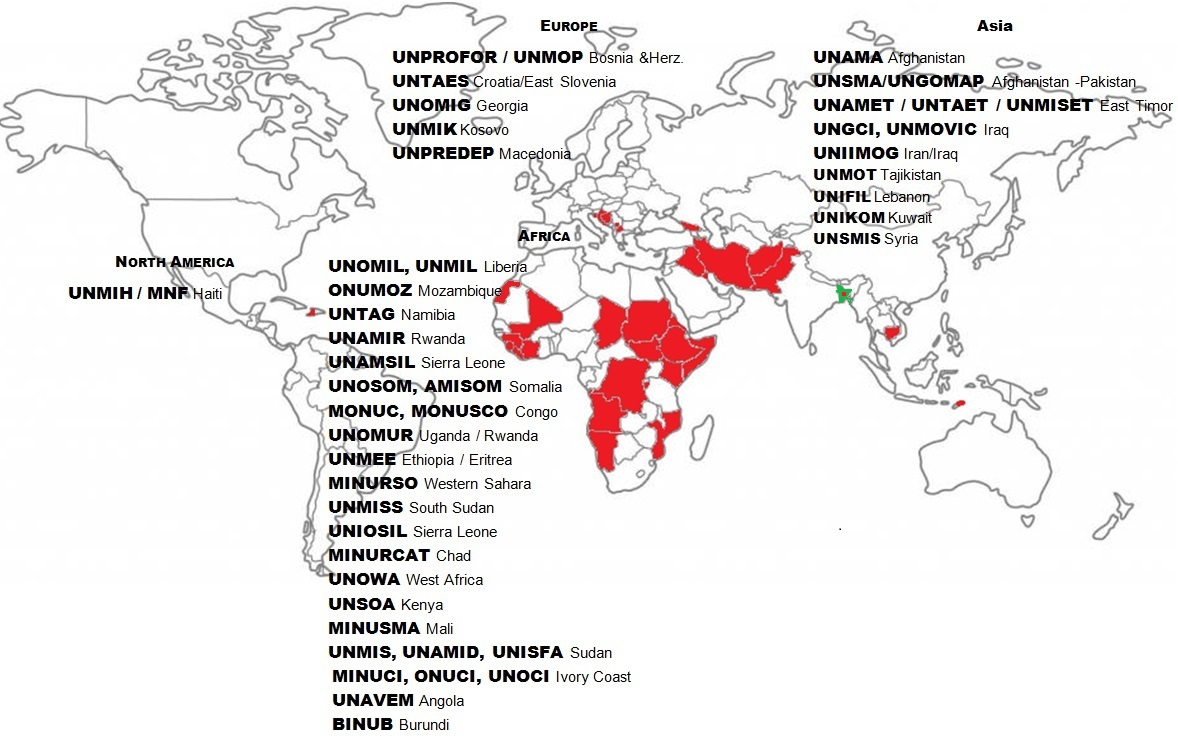
Map of Bangladesh Military UN Peacekeeping Force

== Initiatives ==
=== Mother language day ===
Bangladesh successfully campaigned to establish the International Mother Language Day by UNESCO in 1997. The International Mother Language Day was declared to be 21 February, which was the day Bengalis were killed in Police firing in East Pakistan (today Bangladesh) while protesting to make Bengali a state language of Pakistan as part of the Bengali language movement in 1952.

== See also ==
- Records of the United Nations East Pakistan Relief Operation (UNEPRO), Relief Operations in Dacca/Bangladesh (UNROD/UNROB) (1971-1973) at the United Nations Archives
- UNICEF Bangladesh
