= Luxembourg and the United Nations =

Grand Duchy of Luxembourg

United Nations membership
- Membership: Full member
- Since: 1945
- UNSC seat: Non-permanent
- Ambassador: Christian Braun

The Grand Duchy of Luxembourg is a member of the United Nations.

== History ==
A delegation from Luxembourg headed by Joseph Bech, the Minister of Foreign Affairs, attended the San Francisco Conference and signed the UN Charter on 26 June 1945, becoming the United Nations' smallest founding member state. In 1975, Prime Minister and Minister of Foreign Affairs, Gaston Thorn, presided over the General Assembly's 30th session.

As a founding member of the European Economic Community and its successor the European Union, Luxembourg has contributed to its mission to the UN since its admission as an observer in 1974. In 1976, 1980, 1985, 1991, 1997, 2005, and 2015 Luxembourg served as the Chair of the European Council of Ministers, thus representing the EEC and the EU at the UN.

From September 2003 to September 2004, Luxembourg served as Vice-President of the General Assembly's 58th session. From 2007 to 2009, the country was a member of the Economic and Social Council (ECOSOC). In 2008, Luxembourg was elected a member of the ECOSOC Bureau. Ambassador Sylvie Lucas was also elected as the Economic and Social Council's 65th President on 15 January 2009, serving until 19 January 2010.

In 2001, Luxembourg presented its candidacy for a non-permanent Security Council seat for 2013 and 2014, and was subsequently elected for the WEOG seat on 18 October 2012 alongside Australia. This was the first time Luxembourg had served on the council. In March 2014 Lucas served as President of the United Nations Security Council.

== Contributions ==
- In 1988, Luxembourg donated the sculpture Non-Violence, a statue of a Colt Python revolver with its barrel tied in a knot (also known as the “Knotted Gun”) created by Carl Fredrik Reuterswärd, to the UN, where it now stands in front of the United Nations Headquarters in New York.
- The Luxembourg Army, as a member of Eurocorps, has contributed to various UN peacekeeping forces including the UNPROFOR and IFOR missions in former Yugoslavia, UNIFIL in Lebanon, and have also deployed to Afghanistan to support ISAF. Luxembourg has financially supported international peacekeeping missions in Iraq–Kuwait and Rwanda.
- In 2000, Luxembourg's Official Development Assistance (ODA) to the UN was 0.81%, going beyond 0.7% GNP threshold set by the General Assembly. In 2012, the ODA rose to 1.09% of GNI, making Luxembourg's contribution the largest.
- As of 2014, Luxembourg contributed to 0.081% of the UN budget.

== See also ==
- Foreign relations of Luxembourg
- European Union and the United Nations
