= Marshall Islands and the United Nations =

Republic of the Marshall Islands

United Nations membership
- Membership: Full member
- Since: September 17, 1991
- UNSC seat: Non-permanent
- Ambassador: Phillip H. Muller

The Marshall Islands joined the United Nations on September 17, 1991. Although the Marshall Islands are sovereign, the Republic is bound by a Compact of Free Association with the United States. The Marshall Islands show overwhelming support for the United States. In 2015, however, the Marshall Islands voted to condemn the US embargo over Cuba. The motion at the United Nations was supported by 191 member states, with two votes against (the United States and Israel) and no country abstaining.

The Marshall Islands are also one of the staunchest supporters of Israel, like the United States. In December 2017, the Marshall Islands was one of just nine countries (including the United States and Israel) to vote against a motion adopted by the United Nations General Assembly condemning the United States' recognition of Jerusalem as the capital of Israel. The United States government had threatened to cut aid to states voting in favor of the motion.

== See also ==
- United States and the United Nations
- Micronesia and the United Nations
- Marshall Islands-United States relations
- Israel-Marshall Islands relations
