= United Nations Security Council Resolution 175 =

UN Security Council Resolution 175
- Date: September 12 1962
- Meeting no.: 1018
- Code: S/5167 (Document)
- Subject: Admission of new Members to the UN: Trinidad and Tobago
- Voting summary: 11 voted for; None voted against; None abstained
- Result: Adopted

Security Council composition
- Permanent members: China; France; Soviet Union; United Kingdom; United States
- Non-permanent members: Chile; Ghana; Ireland; Romania; United Arab Republic; Venezuela

United Nations Security Council Resolution 175, adopted on September 12, 1962, after examining the application of the State of Trinidad and Tobago for membership in the United Nations the Council recommended to the General Assembly that the State of Trinidad and Tobago be admitted.

The resolution was adopted unanimously.

== See also ==
- List of United Nations Security Council Resolutions 101 to 200 (1953–1965)
