= Vanuatu and the United Nations =

Republic of Vanuatu

United Nations membership
- Membership: Full member
- Since: 1980
- UNSC seat: Non-permanent (never elected)
- Ambassador: Odo Tevi

The Republic of Vanuatu has been a member of the United Nations since the year of its independence in 1980. The country was a particularly active member in the 1980s, when, governed by Prime Minister Father Walter Lini and represented by Ambassador Robert Van Lierop, it was a consistent advocate for decolonisation. Subsequently, its emphasis within the United Nations shifted to the issue of climate change and the vulnerability of Small Island Developing States.

== 1980s: the Lini and Van Lierop years ==
In 1980, when the newly independent Vanuatu joined the United Nations, its Prime Minister, Walter Lini, asked Robert Van Lierop, an American film director and civil rights activist, to be its Permanent Representative at the United Nations. The two men had met when Vanuatu had been a topic of discussion at the U.N. just prior to its independence. Van Lierop accepted, and represented Vanuatu for over a decade. He was, throughout the 1980s, Vanuatu's only diplomat stationed permanently in New York City, and he visited Vanuatu twice a year on average.

As Vanuatu's ambassador, and following instructions from the ni-Vanuatu government, he campaigned within the U.N. against apartheid in South Africa, and in favour of decolonisation for East Timor, Western Sahara, West Papua and New Caledonia, among others. Van Lierop stated in 1990 that "On the issue of decolonisation, in particular for New Caledonia, Vanuatu is recognised as one of the principal promoters of independence, and this has resulted in great respect for our country". Vanuatu was a member of the Non-Aligned Movement, and Lini's government cherished its independence, emphasising that Vanuatu had its own voice at the United Nations, eschewing alignment with either the Western bloc or the Eastern bloc.

In 1988, Van Lierop became Vice-President of 43rd Session of the United Nations General Assembly. In 1990, he was chairman of the United Nations' Special Committee on Decolonization, in keeping with Vanuatu's long-standing efforts in that field.

== Climate change and Small Island States' vulnerability ==
In 1990, Van Lierop became the first chairman of the Alliance of Small Island States, a position which he held until 1994; he emphasised the importance of the fight against climate change, to which Small Island Developing States are particularly vulnerable.

This has remained Vanuatu's emphasis to this day. Addressing the United Nations General Assembly in September 2008, ni-Vanuatu President Kalkot Mataskelekele stated:

"I join my fellow colleagues from the Pacific region in our call to the international community for more concerted action in addressing climate change as a security issue. Unless the present trend of global warming is reversed through sincere and concerted international action through the UN framework, some of our Pacific colleague nations will be submerged. If such a tragedy does happen, then the UN and its members would have failed in their first and most basic duty to a member nation and its innocent people."

== Continued support for West Papua ==
Vanuatu in the 2000s and 2010s has not entirely ceased to promote the cause of decolonisation. In September 2004, Foreign Affairs Minister Barak Sopé, addressing the General Assembly, asked that West Papua be added once more to the United Nations list of non-self-governing territories, and stated:

"In recent times the history of the Organization has been characterised by indecision that have (sic) blemished the record of the United Nations, and I speak to (sic) the longstanding issue of self-determination, and in particular the case of West Papua cognizant of the Charter espousing the principles that continue to guide the Organization's efforts in the principle of self-determination. [...] The truth surrounding the so-called Act of Free Choice must be exposed to the Melanesian sisters and brothers of West Papua, and the rest of the international community; the saddest of all is the UN General Assembly Resolution 2504 on West Papua in 1969. How can the UN continue to ignore the cries of over three million people demanding justice?"

In August 2018, Foreign Affairs Minister Ralph Regenvanu announced the government's intention to submit a resolution calling for West Papua's renewed inclusion on the United Nations list of non-self-governing territories. Vanuatu failed to obtain support from the Pacific Islands Forum, and abandoned its intention to submit a formal resolution. Papua New Guinea's Foreign Affairs and Trade Minister Rimbink Pato in particular had stated: "West Papua or Papua is still part and parcel, an integral part of the Republic of Indonesia and we have a bilateral relationship with the Republic of Indonesia, so we will not support that". Regenvanu nonetheless indicated Vanuatu would bring the issue to the attention of the United Nations General Assembly, and would seek support from the European Union, the African, Caribbean and Pacific Group of States, Caricom and the African Union. During his address to the Seventy-third session of the United Nations General Assembly in September, Vanuatu Prime Minister Charlotte Salwai called upon the United Nations to investigate the "violence, human rights violations [and] inhumane acts" committed against the people of West Papua. He also called for the UN to work with Indonesia towards a process of self-determination for West Papuans. Indonesia's representative responded by accusing Vanuatu of supporting "separatist individuals" and "criminal[s]", and of "challenging the internationally agreed principles of friendly relations between states, sovereignty and territorial integrity".
