= Jane Jimmy Chigiyal =

Micronesian diplomat

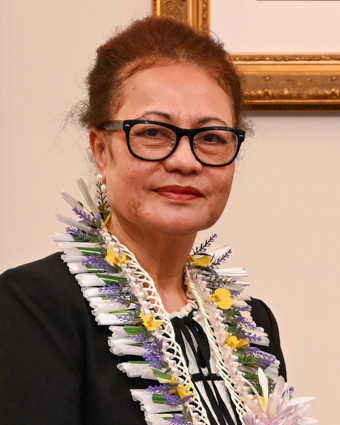
Chigiyal in 2025

Jane Jimmy Chigiyal (born April 3, 1967) is a Micronesian diplomat. On October 4, 2011, Chigiyal was confirmed as the Permanent Representative to the United Nations in a 13–1 vote in the 17th session of the Congress of the Federated States of Micronesia. Chigiyal's confirmation made her the first female Ambassador from the Federated States of Micronesia in history. She presented her credentials to Secretary-General of the United Nations Ban Ki-moon on December 2, 2011.

Chigiyal served as a longtime member of the FSM Department of Foreign Affairs. She held the position of Deputy Secretary for the Department of Foreign Affairs prior to her confirmation as Micronesia's Permanent Representative to the United Nations.
