= Chapter V of the United Nations Charter =

Articles creating the UN Security Council

Chapter V of the United Nations Charter contains the Charter's provisions dealing with the composition, functions, powers and procedures of the UN Security Council (UNSC). The specific powers granted to the council for the discharge of these duties are laid out in Chapters VI, VII, VIII, and XII.

== Article 23, 24, 25 and 26 ==
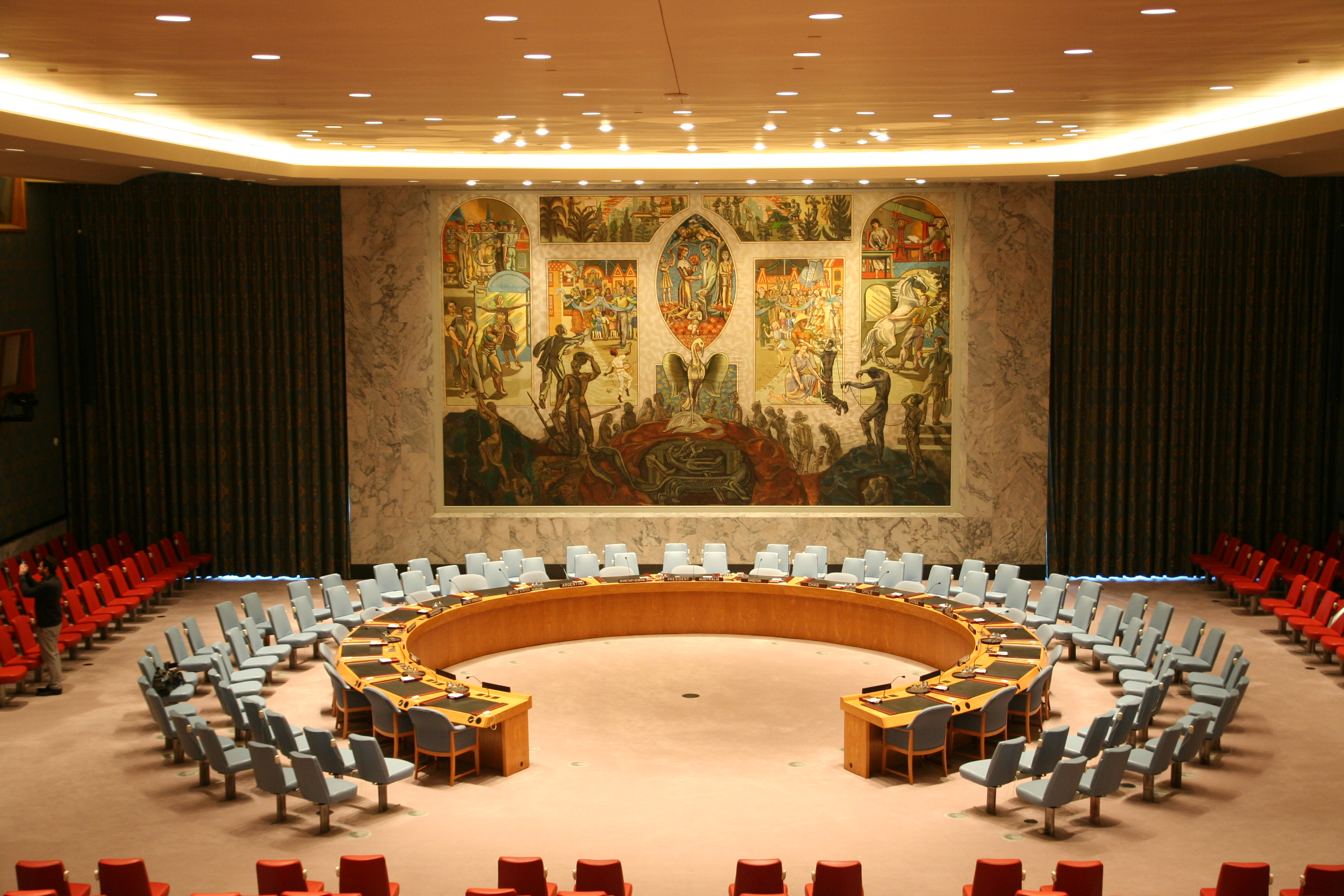
The meeting room exhibits Untitled (Mural for Peace), the United Nations Security Council mural by Per Krohg (1952)

Article 23 establishes the composition of the Security Council, with five permanent members (the Republic of China (currently People's Republic of China), France, the Soviet Union (now Russian Federation), the United Kingdom, and the United States) and 10 non-permanent members elected by the UN General Assembly. The non-permanent members serve two year terms and cannot be immediately re-elected. In the selection process for these non-permanent members, the treaty calls for "due regard being specially paid, in the first instance to the contribution of Members of the United Nations to the maintenance of international peace and security and to the other purposes of the Organization, and also to equitable geographical distribution."

Article 24 gives the Security Council "primary responsibility for the maintenance of international peace and security" and requires the Security Council to act in accordance with the UN's purposes and principles.

Article 25 requires members to "accept and carry out the decisions of the Security Council," a mandate that does not apply with respect to the decisions of any other UN body, with the exception of the World Court's decisions once a country has accepted its jurisdiction.

Article 26 reflects a pro-disarmament sentiment:

In order to promote the establishment and maintenance of international peace and security with the least diversion for armaments of the world's human and economic resources, the Security Council shall be responsible for formulating, with the assistance of the Military Staff Committee referred to in Article 47, plans to be submitted to the Members of the United Nations for the establishment of a system for the regulation of armaments.

Nonetheless, the language employed here is considerably softer than that of Article 8 of the Covenant of the League of Nations, which stated:

The Members of the League agree that the manufacture by private enterprise of munitions and implements of war is open to grave objections. The Council shall advise how the evil effects attendant upon such manufacture can be prevented, due regard being had to the necessities of those Members of the League which are not able to manufacture the munitions and implements of war necessary for their safety.

The Security Council made its first real effort on disarmament in June 1968 when it adopted Resolution 255, which contained assurances for non-nuclear weapon states. Some observers believe that today, the UNSC is not fulfilling its mandate under Article 26.

== Article 27 ==
Article specifies the UNSC's voting procedures. Nine of fifteen members, including all five permanent members, must concur in order for the UNSC to act on a non-procedural measure.

The requirement of the P-5's unanimous assent establishes the famous "great power veto," which deadlocked the UNSC throughout most of the Cold War and has prevented the UNSC from authorizing military action on many occasions, including the Iraq War. It was also used by the U.S. to block re-appointment of UN Secretary-General Boutros Boutros-Ghali. There has been much debate on the veto. Some have interpreted its purpose as being primarily to prevent military action being taken against any member of the P-5; these observers therefore favor limiting the veto to that purpose and not using it for questions such as nomination of a UN Secretary-General.

Procedural measures are not subject to veto, which allows the Security Council to discuss topics over the objection of a veto holding member and even appoint the emergency special session, where no such veto applies.

== 1965 amendment ==
Originally, there were 11 members of the UN Security Council, with the assent of 7 (including the Permanent Five) being required for a decision. In 1965, in recognition of the growing membership of the organization, the Charter was amended to expand the UNSC to 15 members, with the assent of 9 (again including the Permanent Five) being needed to make a decision.

== See also ==
- Reform of the United Nations Security Council
