= United States intelligence budget =

Funding for US intelligence agencies

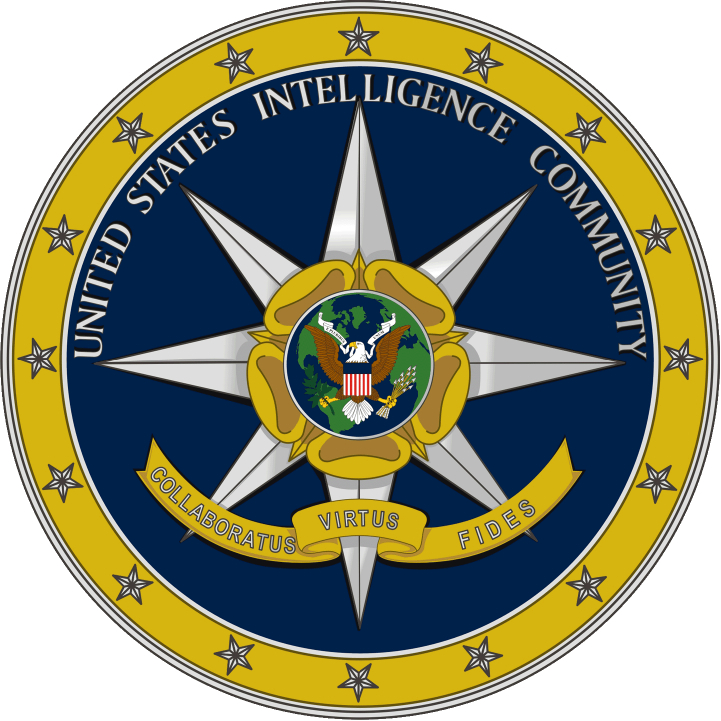
United States Intelligence Community seal

The United States intelligence budget comprises all the funding for the 18 agencies of the United States Intelligence Community. These agencies and other programs fit into one of the intelligence budget's two components, the National Intelligence Program (NIP) and the Military Intelligence Program (MIP). As with other parts of the federal budget, the US intelligence budget runs according to the Fiscal year (FY), not the calendar year. Before government finances are spent on intelligence, the funds must first be authorized and appropriated by committees in both the United States House of Representatives and the United States Senate.

Pursuant to a suggestion by 9/11 Commission, the Director of National Intelligence (DNI) released the top line amount given to the NIP for fiscal year 2009 as US$49.8 billion. This amount has been on a gradually rising trend with record budget requests in 2020 and 2022 of US$62.7 billion and US$65.7 billion respectively. This amount excludes the US$20.7 billion requested for the Military Intelligence Program, which has been recovering from a post-Iraq war 2015 low of US$16.5 billion.

In 2007, it was revealed that 70% of the intelligence budget went to defense contracting companies.

== Components ==
Experts estimate that total spending on American military and non-military intelligence during the Cold War peaked at $71 billion (in 2013 dollars) in the late 1980s. By 1994 spending for the non-military National Intelligence Program (NIP) had declined to $43.4 billion. Fiscal 2013 intelligence spending exceeded the Cold War peak, at $52.6 billion for NIP in the black budget and $23 billion for military intelligence programs. In constant dollars it is about double the estimated 2001 budget and 25% greater than the 2006 budget. From the September 11 attacks on the United States in 2001 to 2013, the government has spent more than $500 billion on intelligence.

=== National Intelligence Program ===
The National Intelligence Program, under budgetary control of the DNI, comprises the agencies and programs formerly under the National Foreign Intelligence Program. This adjustment was made to better include domestic intelligence programs and intelligence arms of the Department of Homeland Security. According to the classified budget documents leaked by Edward Snowden in 2013, the NIP is distributed among agencies in the following manner: This is an unverifiable source, noting that the original source is allegedly classified by the US Government. Original documents to verify this information are unavailable.

In September 2005, the Military Intelligence Program was established by combining all of the agencies formerly under the Joint Military Intelligence Program (JMIP) and most of the program from the former Tactical Intelligence and Related Activities (TIARA) group.

List of some of the Agencies and Programs

National Intelligence Program (NIP)	Military Intelligence Program (MIP)	Both NIP/MIP
Central Intelligence Agency (CIA)	Army Military Intelligence (MI)	National Security Agency (NSA)
Counterintelligence - Federal Bureau of Investigation (FBI)	Air Force Intelligence, Surveillance and Reconnaissance Agency (AF ISR)	Defense Intelligence Agency (DIA)
Bureau of Intelligence and Research (INR) - Department of State (DoS)	Marine Corps Intelligence Activity (MCIA)	National Geospatial-Intelligence Agency (NGA)
Office of Intelligence Support - Department of Treasury	Office of Naval Intelligence (ONI)	
Defense Cryptologic Program (DCP)	Special Operations Command (SOCOM)	

== Outsourcing/privatization ==
An unclassified PowerPoint presentation obtained by Tim Shorrock for a 2007 DIA acquisition conference shows that 70% of the intelligence budget went to defense contractors. In response, the ODNI stated that the overall intelligence budget, or breakdowns of it, could not be calculated based on the figures in the presentation.

According to DIA officials who spoke to a May 2007 Defense Intelligence Acquisition Conference in Colorado, DIA contractors are filling a "workforce gap" that exists at DIA and most of the other agencies. During the 1990s, as intelligence budgets contracted, hundreds of career DIA officers retired and left the intelligence community. When the DIA began hiring new people after 9/11, the veteran officers who should have been around to train and mentor them were gone. But because it takes five to seven years to train a new officer, there was a "generational hole" that could only be filled by former intelligence officers with security clearances; and most of them were working in the private sector.

— Tim Shorrock

General Michael Hayden, former director of the NSA, and later director of the CIA, has stated that the IT infrastructure at Fort Meade (home to the NSA headquarters) is owned by a single company. Hayden also claims that the largest concentration of computing power in the world is located at an office park near Fort Meade, featuring the operations of various NSA contracting companies.

== Budget cycle ==
It takes just over three years for a budget to complete a full cycle from development to execution.

Mark M. Lowenthal's Budget Cycle

Year	Activity	Activity (detail)
1	Planning: Guidance	Broad guidelines of planning, programming, and budgeting are established.
2	Programming: Request and Review	Program resources are projected for future year requirements for dollar and manpower resources.
3	Budgeting: Build and Submit	Money or authority available to purchase goods and services or hire people is set.
4	Execution: Obligate and Spend	Money on authorized programs is committed and spent.

See The United States Budget Process for more information regarding the budget process and cycle.

== Congressional oversight ==
The U.S. Congress derives its oversight powers of the intelligence budget from Article I, Section 9, paragraph 7, of the U.S. Constitution that states, "No Money shall be drawn from the Treasury, but in Consequence of Appropriations made by Law." Congress's authorization and appropriation functions consist of approving programs and activities, and allocating precise dollar amounts to be authorized programs respectively.

Congressional Entities Responsible for Intelligence Budget Oversight

	Senate	House of Representatives
Authorization	Senate Select Committee on Intelligence	House Permanent Select Committee on Intelligence
Appropriation	Senate Appropriations Subcommittee on Defense	House Appropriations Subcommittee on Defense*

- *The House Select Intelligence Oversight Panel provided budgetary and oversight recommendations before it was dissolved.

See United States Intelligence Community Oversight for more general information on the oversight of the Intelligence Community.

== Top-line figure of aggregate NIP and available aggregate MIP budget, FY 2006-present ==
Fiscal Year	NIP in billions of $ appropriated	MIP in billions of $ appropriated
2006	40.9	not disclosed
2007	43.5	20.0
2008	47.5	22.9
2009	49.8	26.4
2010	53.1	27.0
2011	54.6	24.0
2012	53.9	21.5
2013	52.7	18.6
2014	50.5	17.4
2015	50.3	16.5
2016	53.0	17.7
2017	54.6	18.4
2018	59.4	22.1
2019	60.2	21.5
2020	62.7	23.1
2021	60.8	23.3
2022	65.7	24.1
2023	71.7	27.9
2024	76.5	29.8

At the end of each October since 2008, the Director of National Intelligence discloses the aggregate amount of funds appropriated by Congress to the NIP for the next fiscal year within 30 days after the end of the fiscal year, as required by Public Law 110–53. The press release has the following disclaimer: "Any and all subsidiary information concerning the NIP budget, whether the information concerns particular intelligence agencies or particular intelligence programs, will not be disclosed. Beyond the disclosure of the NIP top-line figure, there will be no other disclosures of currently classified NIP budget information, because such disclosures could harm national security. The only exceptions to the foregoing are for unclassified appropriations, primarily for the Community Management Account."

== See also ==
- International affairs budget of the United States
