= United States and the League of Nations =

Despite the United States never becoming an official member of the League of Nations, American individuals and organizations interacted with the League throughout its existence.

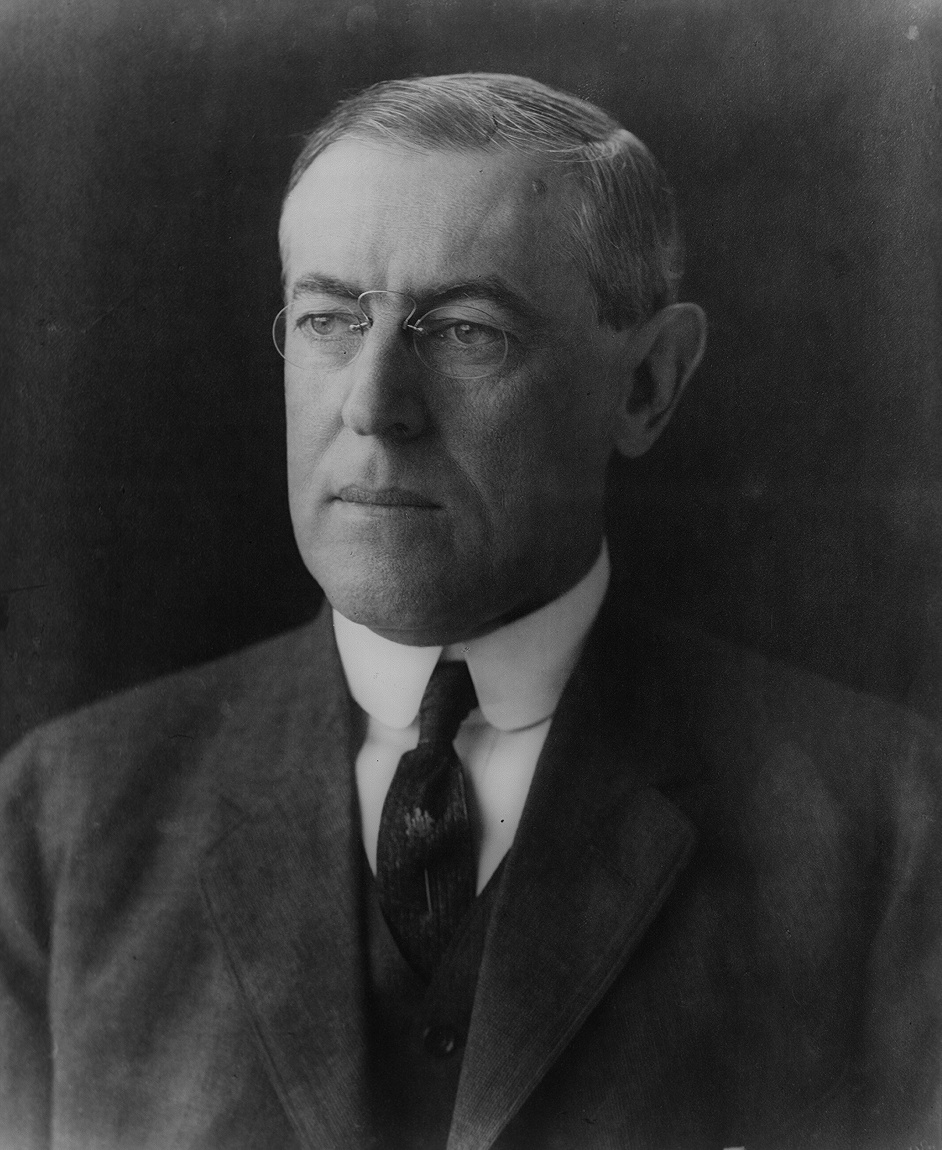
28th US President Woodrow Wilson was the leading architect of the League of Nations.

== Paris Peace Conference and Treaty of Versailles ==
The American President, Woodrow Wilson, was involved in the Paris Peace Conference of 1919 at the conclusion of World War I. At this conference, Wilson played a key role along with other powers in fashioning the terms of the Treaty of Versailles. His ideas surrounding a postwar world order were earlier expressed in his Fourteen Points, and these were discussed in the series of discussions held. One of the key features of the agreement that Wilson campaigned for was the establishment of an international body which would work to maintain the political freedom and independence of nations all around the world. This organization developed into the League of Nations, however, the American nation ultimately decided against becoming a formal member.

== Non-membership of the League of Nations ==
Despite Woodrow Wilson chairing the committee which drafted the Treaty of Versailles Covenant, America voted against becoming official members of the League of Nations in 1919. Historians have explored a variety of reasons as to why exactly the Senate refused to approve the Treaty of Versailles, naming the hostility between President Wilson and Republican senator, Henry Cabot Lodge, and Wilson's declining health as key explanations. Jacobsen states that "the rejection also should be seen in the context of the long-standing American ambivalence about involvement in international politics." Furthermore, the United States would never become a member of the League of Nations, as a two-thirds majority was never granted in the Senate. As a result, the dynamic between members of the League, and between the US and these nations was influenced. Henig explains this by suggesting that the absence of the United States as an official member of the League "widened the gulf between Britain and France."

== League of Nations organization and non-state actors ==
Despite the United States' lack of formal membership, the United States was involved in various League related projects and organizations. They were involved in various sectors:

American citizens were employed at the secretariat; American academics contributed to League-sponsored research projects; American philanthropies financially supported these same economic projects, and American representatives from the banking and financial communities sat on its economic and financial committees.

A notable American organization involved with the League of Nations was the Rockefeller Foundation, as many of its goals and aspirations were similar to those of the League. It was involved in the international economic section of the League and made considerable contributions to it during the 1930s.

== Involvement in the Manchurian Crisis ==
The United States was involved with the League of Nations in resolving the Manchurian Crisis.

Debates surround the United States' policy of isolationism in international affairs during the 1920s and 1930s. However, according to Thompson, it was the Manchurian Crisis of 1931-1932 that made Secretary of State, Henry L. Stimson support the position that isolationism was no longer an option for the United States. Despite the American emphasis on their separateness from the League of Nations, a commission of inquiry sent to Japan in February 1932 was representative of the great powers, including the United States. They had agreed to work collaboratively with the League to bring an end to the situation, however, they would "only operate under the Washington agreements of 1922 and the Kellogg-Briand Pact."

== Transition into the United Nations ==
The American absence in the League of Nations did not prevent the nation from becoming an official member of the United Nations (UN), formed at the conclusion of the Second World War. The United States was one of five permanent members of the Security Council, with the other four countries being the Soviet Union (USSR), France, Republic of China, and the United Kingdom. The proposed task of this body was "to work together to secure the maintenance of international peace and security."

The membership of the United States and the USSR in the United Nations is a key difference between the post-World War II international organization and the League of Nations. According to Henig, the official involvement of the United States "gave the United Nations a global reach which the League lacked, symbolised by the fact that its headquarters was established in New York."

== See also ==
- Criticism of United States foreign policy
- Foreign policy of the United States
- Foreign policy of the Woodrow Wilson administration
- History of the foreign policy of the United States
- History of U.S. foreign policy, 1913–1933
- International organization membership of the United States
- Lodge Reservations
- United States and the International Criminal Court – Another European-based international organization the United States refused to join in the 21st century
- United States and the United Nations – United States' relationship with the League's successor
- United States non-interventionism
