= Criticism of the United Nations =

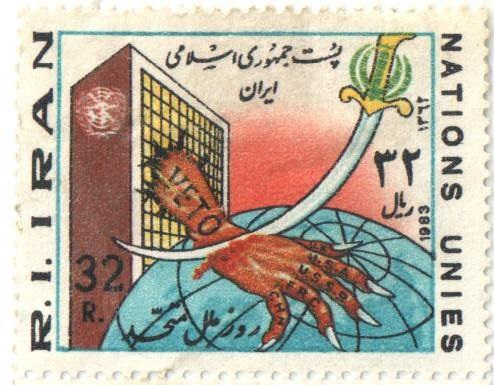
Iranian stamp from 1983, issued during the Iran–Iraq War

The United Nations has been criticized for a variety of reasons, including its policies, ideology, equality of representation, administration, ability to enforce rulings, and ideological bias.

Often cited points of criticism include a perceived lack of the body's efficacy (including a total lack of efficacy in both pre-emptive measures and de-escalation of existing conflicts which have ranged from social disputes to all-out wars), antisemitism, appeasement, collusion, corruption, discrimination, promotion of globalism, inaction, abuse of power by nations exerting general control over the General Assembly, and misappropriation of resources.

A number of decisions by the United Nations are seen as failures to prevent armed conflicts and enforce the Charter of the United Nations.

== Philosophical and moral criticisms ==
=== Moral relativism ===
In 2004, former Israeli ambassador to the UN Dore Gold published a book called Tower of Babble: How the United Nations Has Fueled Global Chaos. The book argued that the organization's approach to issues like genocide and terrorism showed a lack of consistent moral clarity, which occurred between the moral clarity of its founding period and the present.

The UN General Assembly decided to hold a moment of silence in honor of North Korean dictator Kim Jong-il following his death in 2011. Western diplomats criticized the decision. An official at the Czech Republic's UN mission said the Czechs did not request a similar moment of silence for Václav Havel, the playwright-turned-dissident who died a day after Kim.

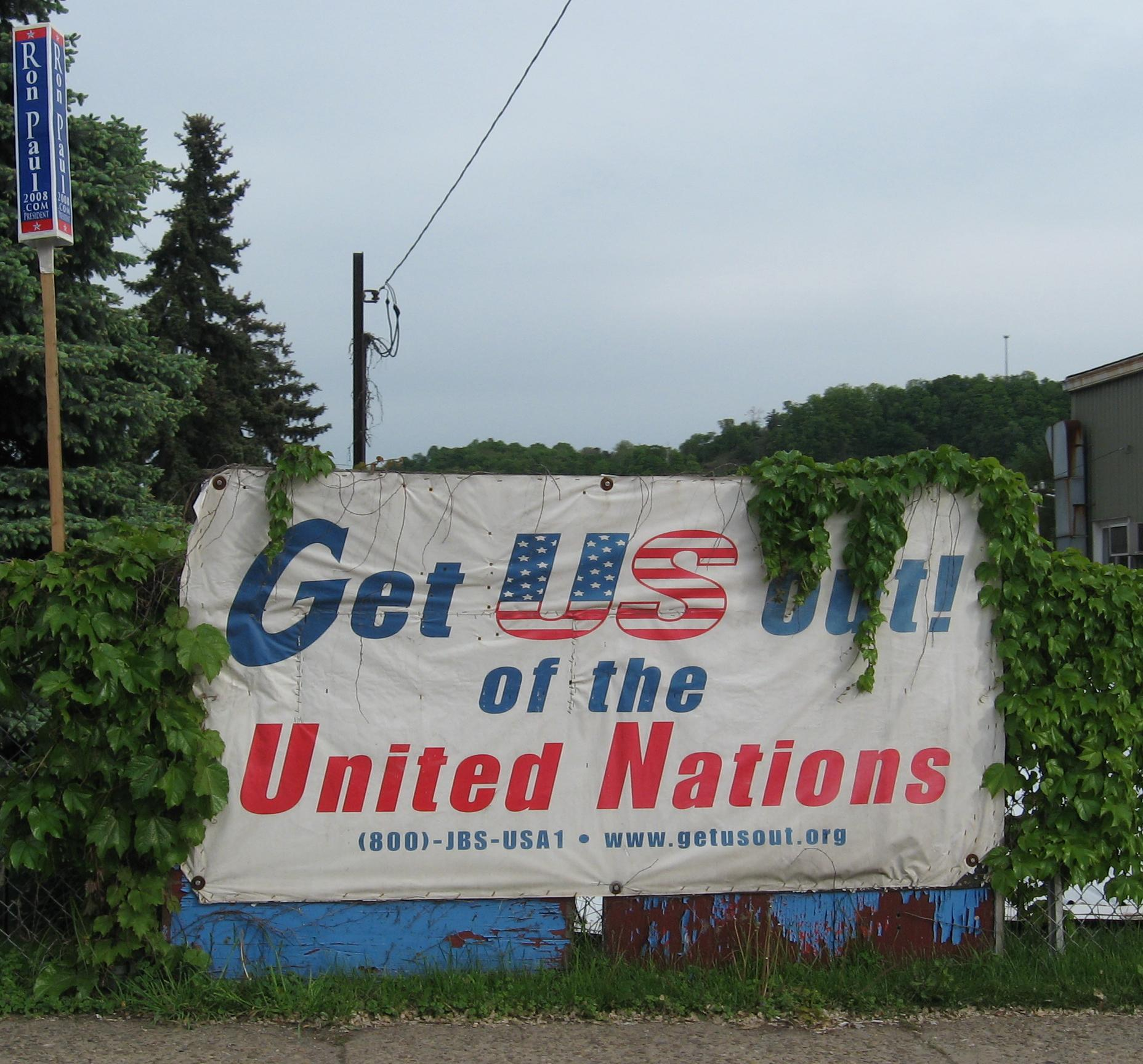
A John Birch Society sign advocating for U.S. withdrawal from the UN

=== Threat to national sovereignty ===
Some critics of the UN have expressed concerns that it may affect national sovereignty and promote globalism:

- In the United States, the John Birch Society was an early opponent of the United Nations. One of the first public activities of the Society was a "Get US Out!" (of membership in the UN) campaign, which claimed in 1959 that the "Real nature of [the] UN is to build a One World Government". In subsequent years, the JBS continued campaigning against U.S. membership in the UN.
- Charles de Gaulle of France criticized the UN, famously calling it le machin ('the thing'). He was not convinced that a global security alliance would help in maintaining world peace, preferring direct defense treaties between countries.
- The American Sovereignty Restoration Act has been introduced multiple times in the United States Congress. In its first year, it had 54 supporters in the House. The 2007 version of the bill (H.R. 1146) was authored by U.S. Representative Ron Paul, Republican of the 14th district of Texas, to effect U.S. withdrawal from the United Nations. It would repeal various laws pertaining to the UN, terminate authorization for funds to be spent on the UN, terminate UN presence on U.S. property, and withdraw diplomatic immunity for UN employees. It would provide up to two years for the U.S. to withdraw. The Yale Law Journal cited the Act as proof that "the United States's complaints against the United Nations have intensified." The most recent iteration, as of 2022, is H.R.7806, introduced by Rep. Mike D. Rogers.
- American state lawmakers have proposed legislation to block various UN programs deemed to threaten U.S. sovereignty. In 2023, Tennessee enacted legislation to block the implementation of programs “originating in, or traceable to, the United Nations or a subsidiary entity of the United Nations,” including Agenda 21 and the 2030 Agenda.

=== Debates surrounding population control and abortion ===
Some American conservative activists have argued that the United Nations Population Fund provides support for government programs that promote forced abortions and coercive sterilizations. In response to these allegations, the U.S. Congress passed the Kemp-Kasten amendment in 1985 to empower the president to block U.S. funding of programs deemed by the president to include "coercive abortion or involuntary sterilization". Since its passage, all Republican presidents (Reagan, H.W. Bush, W. Bush, and Trump) have withheld funding from the UNFPA – a policy known as the Mexico City policy.

The UNFPA provided aid to Peru's population control program in the 1990s, during which time it was discovered the Peruvian program had been engaged in carrying out coercive sterilizations. The UNFPA was not found directly involved in the scandal but continued to fund and work with the population control program after the abuses had become public. The issue played a role in the Bush administration's decision in 2002 to cut off funding for the organization.

== Administrative criticisms ==
=== Role of elite countries ===
There has been criticism that the five permanent members of the United Nations Security Council (China, France, Russia, the United Kingdom, and the United States), who are all nuclear powers, have created an exclusive club of mostly Western Powers who fail to represent the world as a whole. This criticism has led to accusations that the UNSC only addresses the strategic interests and political motives of the permanent members, especially in humanitarian interventions: for example, protecting the oil-rich Kuwaitis in 1991, but poorly protecting resource-poor Rwandans in 1994.

=== Membership in the UN Security Council ===
Any country may be elected to serve a temporary term on the Security Council, but critics have suggested that this is inadequate. Rather, they argue, the number of permanent members should be expanded to include non-nuclear powers, which would democratize the organization. Still other countries have advocated abolishing the concept of permanency altogether; under the government of Paul Martin, Canada advocated this approach. One of the main criticisms belongs to Turkey's President Recep Tayyip Erdogan. He has expressed his objection to the UN Security Council's permanent membership system with the motto "The world is bigger than five."

=== Veto power ===
Another criticism of the Security Council involves the veto power of the five permanent members. As it stands, a veto from any of the permanent members can halt any possible action the Council may take. One country's objection, rather than the opinions of a majority of countries, may cripple any possible UN armed or diplomatic response to a crisis. As part of the Soviet Union, Russia vetoed 90 resolutions between 1949 and 1991. As of July 2019, the Soviet Union and Russia vetoed 141 times, United States 83 times, UK 32 times, France 18 times, and China 14 times. John J. Mearsheimer noted that "since 1982, the US has vetoed 32 Security Council resolutions critical of Israel, more than the total number of vetoes cast by all the other Security Council members." Since candidates for the Security Council are proposed by regional blocs, the Arab League and its allies are usually included but Israel, which joined the UN in 1949, has never been elected to the Security Council. The Council has repeatedly condemned Israel, but has never managed to pass any significant interventional actions against the country, especially regarding its part in the Israeli-Palestinian conflict. On the other hand, critics contend that, while Israel has the United States to rely on to veto any pertinent legislation against it, the Palestinians lack any such power. Apart from the US, several resolutions have been vetoed by Russia, notably attempts to impose sanctions on Syria during the Syrian Civil War and to condemn Russia's own annexation of Crimea in 2014. In the case of the latter, Russia's lone veto overruled the thirteen other votes in favor of the condemnation. Russia vetoed a UN resolution condemning the USSR's shooting down of Korean Air Lines Flight 007 in 1983. The veto has been singled out as a threat to human rights, with Amnesty International claiming that the five permanent members had used their veto to "promote their political self-interest or geopolitical interest above the interest of protecting civilians." As of 2014, Amnesty International has suggested that a solution would involve the five permanent members surrendering their veto on issues of genocide. Some see the fact that veto power is exclusive to the permanent five as being anachronistic and unjust, given that the United Nations is meant to equally represent all its member states. Aside from criticism directed towards its biased nature, others have pointed out that the veto makes it difficult for the Security Council to solve issues. While addressing the UN General Assembly on the Russian annexation of Crimea, Ukrainian President Petro Poroshenko said the following regarding the inefficiency of the veto "In every democratic country, if someone has stolen your property, an independent court will restore justice, in order to protect your rights, and punish the offender. However, we must recognize that in the 21st century our organization lacks an effective instrument to bring to justice an aggressor country that has stolen the territory of another sovereign state."

=== Fait accompli ===
The practice of the permanent members meeting privately and then presenting their resolutions to the full council as a fait accompli has also drawn criticism; according to Erskine Barton Childers, "the vast majority of members – North as well as South – have made very clear...their distaste for the way three Western powers [the UK, US, and France] behave in the Council, like a private club of hereditary elite-members who secretly come to decisions and then emerge to tell the grubby elected members that they may now rubber-stamp those decisions."

=== Gender disparity ===
The United Nations has received some criticism in its gender-inclusivity and its reception of feminist viewpoints. While at the large scale the UN provides outlets and aid to women through UN Women and the Sustainable Development Goals, the reality is that the UN is still very male-dominated. While it has achieved gender parity in its employees at the two lowest levels of responsibility (P-1 and P-2), equal representation has not yet been achieved at any levels higher than these. Senior leadership as of 2015 was made up of 78% men, and parity is not expected for another 112 years based on current trends. Both the percentage of appointments made and the likelihood and speed at which employees are promoted mirror the trend above; parity achieved at low levels while at the D-2 level women see roughly a quarter of what their male counterparts do.

One reason attributed with the slow progress is that there are no methods to hold the UN accountable to its proposed changes due to its size and the different approaches taken within the different subsidiaries of the organization.

=== Democratic character of the UN ===
Other critics object to the idea that the UN is a democratic organization, saying that it represents the interests of the governments of the countries who form it and not necessarily the individuals within those countries. World federalist Dieter Heinrich points out that the powerful Security Council system does not have distinctions between the legislative, executive, and judiciary branches: the United Nations Charter gives all three powers to the Security Council.

One idea that has been put forward to address this is the United Nations Parliamentary Assembly, which was originally proposed in 1920, but has never been implemented.

=== Multi-Sections System ===
In a 2014 interview, Yigal Palmor, former spokesman of the Israeli Ministry of Foreign Affairs, complained that the regional group structure of the UN prevented Israel from participating in the United Nations System. Palmor argued that Israel should belong to the Asia-Pacific Group but was excluded due to objections from Arab countries in the region, and that its exclusion has hampered its ability to adequately pursue its interests within the United Nations. Israel became part of the Western European and Others Group on a temporary basis in 2000, gaining permanency status in 2014.

=== Corruption in the UN Security Council ===
According to a study by Ilyana Kuziemko and Eric Werker, there is a strong connection between the distribution of foreign aid payments and rotating membership of the United Nations Security Council. Regarding the US foreign aid expenditure, ODA (Official Development Assistance)—receiving countries which hold a rotating seat of the UNSC experience on average a rise of 59% in payments ($16 million); concerning financial support from the United Nations, an increase of 8% ($1 million) is being detected. This rise in payments does however not apply the whole time: Kuziemko and Werker used a "New York Times"-Index to differentiate between important and unimportant years. The more the UN and the UNSC were mentioned in The New York Times, the more important the year was considered. The Korean War in the early 1950s, the Congo War in the early 1960s, and the numerous peacekeeping missions in the 1990s were decisive events. During unimportant and medium important years, ODA-receiving countries with a seat in the UNSC did not experience a significant rise in aid payments. During important years however, an increase of 170% could be detected ($16 million more). Regarding UN payments, the difference also exists, but is not as high (53% more financial support or $8 million during important years). One of the reasons could be that it is easier for the US to quickly distribute money, while aid payments of the United Nations mean a lot of bureaucracy beforehand.

Kuziemko and Werker believe that this increase in payments does not happen because the ODA-receiving countries on the security council are able to use the chance and raise awareness for their problems. As soon as the country's time in council is over, the financial aid drops to the level prior to the time serving on the United Nations Security Council. However, the financial aid payments are noted to have already risen the year before the two-year term on the UNSC.

The increase of aid payments is especially high regarding financial support by the United Nations Children's Emergency Fund (UNICEF). During years with a high importance measured by the "New-York-Times"- Index, UNICEF offers 63% more funds to ODA-receiving countries serving on the UNSC than before they had a seat. Kuziemko and Werker argue that since its founding in 1947, the head of UNICEF has always held US citizenship. Therefore, the executive directors may be the long arm of the US government and pursue the interest of the United States through UNICEF. A similar, although not as significant increase can be seen regarding the distribution of aid payments through UNDP.

It is impossible though to say if the increase of foreign aid payments by the US or by the UN have changed receiving countries' voting behavior, as they would never admit being open for bribery.

=== Controversy over the role of non-democratic states ===
The Human Rights Council has been subject to controversy due to the role non-democratic states play in it, with only 30% of the countries within it as of 2023 being classified as free by the think tank Freedom House. That same year, Iran was chosen to chair the Human Rights Council's Social Forum, drawing condemnations from 26 human rights groups due to the killings of protesters by security forces during the Mahsa Amini protests. Similar statements were made by the United States' Iranian embassy.

In 2024, the UN's Commission on the Status of Women (CSW) appointed Saudi Arabia to chair its 69th session in 2025, stirring controversy among women's rights advocates. Amnesty International condemned the decision, citing the country's "abysmal record when it comes to protecting and promoting the rights of women".

== Effectiveness criticisms ==
Some have questioned whether the UN might be relevant in the 21st century. While the UN's first and second Charter mandates require the UN: "To maintain international peace and security.... (and if necessary to enforce the peace by) taking preventive or enforcement action," due to its restrictive administrative structure, the permanent members of the Security Council themselves have sometimes prevented the UN from fully carrying out its first two mandates. Without the unanimous approval, support (or minimally abstention) of all five of the permanent members of the UN's Security Council, the UN's charter only enables it to "observe", report on, and make recommendations regarding international conflicts. Such unanimity on the Security Council regarding the authorization of armed UN enforcement actions has not always been reached in time to prevent the outbreak of international wars.

In 1962, UN secretary general U Thant provided valuable assistance and took a great deal of time, energy and initiative as the primary negotiator between Nikita Khrushchev and John F. Kennedy during the Cuban Missile Crisis, thus providing a critical link in the prevention of a nuclear war at that time. A 2005 RAND Corporation study found the UN to be successful in two out of three peacekeeping efforts. It compared UN nation-building efforts to those of the United States, and found that seven out of eight UN cases are at peace, as opposed to four out of eight US cases at peace. Also in 2005, the Human Security Report documented a decline in the number of wars, genocides and human rights abuses since the end of the Cold War, and presented evidence, albeit circumstantial, that international activism – mostly spearheaded by the UN – has been the main cause of the decline in armed conflict since the end of the Cold War or due to the fact the US and USSR were no longer pumping up oppressive governments after the Cold war ended.

The bureaucratic dimension of the UN has been a cause for frustration with the organization. In 1994, former Special Representative of the Secretary-General of the UN to Somalia Mohamed Sahnoun published "Somalia: The Missed Opportunities", a book in which he analyses the reasons for the failure of the 1992 UN intervention in Somalia; he shows in particular that, between the start of the Somali Civil War in 1988 and the fall of the Siad Barre regime in January 1991, the United Nations missed at least three opportunities to prevent major human tragedies. When the UN tried to provide humanitarian assistance, they were totally outperformed by NGOs, whose competence and dedication sharply contrasted with the United Nations' bureaucratic inefficiencies and excessive caution (most UN envoys to Somalia operating from the safety of their desks in Nairobi rather than visiting clan leaders in the field). If sweeping reform was not undertaken, warned Mohamed Sahnoun, then the United Nations would continue to respond to such crisis in a climate of inept improvisation.

== Diplomatic and political criticisms ==
=== Inability to prevent conflicts ===
Critics and even proponents of the United Nations have noted that in most high-profile cases, there are essentially no consequences for violating a Security Council resolution. An early example of this was the Bangladesh Liberation War and the 1971 Bangladesh genocide committed by the Pakistan Army on Bangladeshis. Critics of the UN argued that the UN was completely ineffective in preventing the genocide, and that military intervention by India was the only thing to stop the mass murder. Another such case occurred in the Srebrenica massacre where Serbian troops committed a massacre against Bosnian Muslims in the largest case of mass murder on the European continent since World War II. Srebrenica had been declared UN a "safe area" and was even protected by 370 armed Dutch peacekeepers, but the UN forces failed to provide adequate support to prevent the massacre. In the 21st century, the most prominent and dramatic example is the War in Darfur, in which Arab Janjaweed militias, supported by the Sudanese government, committed repeated acts of ethnic cleansing and genocide against the indigenous population. As of 2013, an estimated 300,000 civilians have been killed in what is the largest case of mass murder in the history of the region, yet the UN has continuously failed to act against this severe and ongoing human rights issue. At the 68th Session of the UN General Assembly, New Zealand Prime Minister John Key heavily criticized the UN's inaction on Syria, more than two years after the Syrian Civil War began.

=== Handling of the Cold War ===
In 1967, Richard Nixon, while running for President of the United States, criticized the UN as "obsolete and inadequate" for dealing with then-present crises like the Cold War. Jeane Kirkpatrick, who was appointed by Ronald Reagan to be United States Ambassador to the United Nations, wrote in a 1983 opinion piece in The New York Times that the process of discussions at the Security Council "more closely resembles a mugging" of the United States "than either a political debate or an effort at problem-solving."

=== Attention given to the Arab-Israeli conflict ===
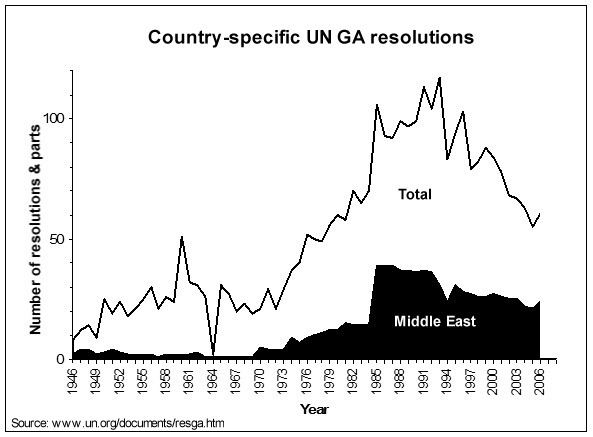
Number of country-specific UN General Assembly resolutions concerned with the Middle East (Palestine & Palestinians, Israel, Lebanon, Syria) vs. total country-specific resolutions. The graph is additive.

Issues relating to the state of Israel, Palestine, and other aspects of the Arab–Israeli conflict occupy a large amount of debate time, resolutions and resources at the United Nations. The former Secretary of State of the United States, John Kerry, has accused the U.N. Human Rights Council of focusing disproportionately on allegations of abuses by Israel. Ban Ki-moon, the Secretary-General of the United Nations, argued that the UN had focused disproportionately on Israel, with a volume of resolutions that he believed hampered the organization's effectiveness. Other critics such as Dore Gold, Alan Dershowitz, Mark Dreyfus, Robert S. Wistrich, Alan Keyes, and the Anti-Defamation League also consider UN attention on Israel's treatment of Palestinians to be excessive. According to Wistrich, "a third of all critical resolutions passed by [the UN] Human Rights Commission during the past forty years have been directed exclusively at Israel. By way of comparison, there has not been a single resolution even mentioning the massive violations of human rights in China, Russia, North Korea, Cuba, Saudi Arabia, Syria, or Zimbabwe."

The adoption of UNSCOP's recommendation to partition Palestine by the United Nations General Assembly in 1947 was one of the earliest decisions of the UN. American lawyer Alan Dershowitz claimed that, after the 1948 Arab–Israeli War, the UN defined the term "refugee" as applied to Palestinian Arabs fleeing Israel in significantly broader terms than it did for refugees of other conflicts. The UNHCR, responsible for all refugees but the Palestinians, limits refugee status only to those who fled/were dispossessed of their homes and lands; by contrast, the UNRWA, responsible for Palestinian refugees, extends refugee status to descendants of the original refugees.

In 2007, United Nations Human Rights Council president Doru Romulus Costea said that the UNHRC had "failed" in dealing with the Israeli-Palestinian conflict.

The UN has sponsored several peace negotiations between Israel and its neighbors, the latest being the 2002 Road map for peace. The controversial United Nations General Assembly Resolution 3379 (1975), which determined that Zionism is a form of racism and racial discrimination, was rescinded in 1991 as one of Israel's conditions for its participation in the Madrid Peace Conference. Robert S. Wistrich commented, "on the same day Resolution 3379 was adopted, the General Assembly decided to establish the 'Committee on the Inalienable Rights of the Palestinian People.' With a large budget at its disposal and acting as an integral part of the United Nations, it has for more than thirty years done everything within its power to establish a Palestinian state in place of Israel."

=== Allegations of anti-Zionism and antisemitism ===
Several critics have accused the United Nations of tolerating antisemitic remarks. Such critics include attorney Alan Dershowitz; human rights activists Elie Wiesel, Anne Bayefsky, and Bayard Rustin; historian Robert S. Wistrich, and feminists Phyllis Chesler and Sonia Johnson. Wistrich stated Israeli delegates to the UN have for decades "been treated to a sickening litany of anti-Semitic abuse at the General Assembly, in the UN Human Rights Commission, and sometimes even in the Security Council"UN conferences throughout the 1970s and into the 1980s often passed resolutions denouncing Zionism.

American politician William Lehman claimed in 1981 that UN documents of the period denied the existence of the Jews, the ancient history of Israel, the Holocaust, and the notion Jews deserve the same rights granted to other groups.

Wistrich described the 1980 World Conference of the United Nations Decade for Women in Copenhagen in his book, A Lethal Obsession:

Jewish feminists heard truly chilling comments, such as "The only good Jew is a dead Jew" and "The only way to rid the world of Zionism is to kill all the Jews." One eye-witness overheard other delegates saying that the American women's movement had a bad name because its most prominent founding figures ... were all Jewish. The feminist activist Sonia Johnson described the anti-Semitism at the Copenhagen conference as "over, wild, and irrational." ... The psychologist and author Phyllis Chesler recorded the savage response when one Jewish woman mentioned that her husband had been shot without a trial in Iraq and that she had to escape to Israel with her children. The place went wild: "Cuba si! Yankee no! PLO! PLO!" they shouted. "Israel kills babies and women. Israel must die."

Israeli and American politicians also criticized the November 1975 passage of United Nations General Assembly Resolution 3379, which claimed Zionism is a form of racism. Many observers, including Chaim Herzog, Israel's ambassador to the United Nations at the time of the passage, noted how the resolution was passed on the thirty-seventh anniversary of Kristallnacht, a pogrom in Nazi Germany viewed by historians as a prelude to the Holocaust.

The UN World Conference against Racism 2001 was held in Durban, South Africa and included discussion of the second-class citizenry issue in Israel, among other topics. Some media observers claimed the conference constituted a forum for world leaders to make various antisemitic statements. British-Canadian conservative commentator Barbara Amiel condemned the distribution of antisemitic literature by non-governmental organizations attending the conference, citing cartoons equating the swastika with the Star of David. Tom Lantos, Colin Powell, Chuck Schumer, Elie Wiesel, Irwin Cotler, Alan Dershowitz, and Robert S. Wistrich condemned the entire conference, calling it hateful, racist, and antisemitic.

Alice Wairimu Nderitu, the former UN Special Adviser on the Prevention of Genocide, alleged her contract was not renewed in November 2024 because she declined to label Israel's conduct in the Gaza war a genocide. She also accused the UN of being overly focused on Israel, and ignoring other humanitarian crises in Ukraine and Sudan. UN spokesperson Stéphane Dujarric responded by saying Nderitu's accusations were untrue, noting no member of the Secretary-General's cabinet, of which Nderitu was a part of, had declared the situation in Gaza a genocide.

=== Alleged support for Palestinian militancy ===
According to Dore Gold, Alan Dershowitz, and Robert S. Wistrich, the United Nations has a long history of elevating what it calls "national liberation movements," armed groups who commit violence against civilians to achieve political goals, virtually to the status of civilians. In 1974 and again in 1988, the UN invited Yasser Arafat to address the General Assembly. Alan Dershowitz accused the UN of allowing states that sponsor terrorism to sit on the Security Council. These visits legitimized the PLO without it "having to renounce terrorism."

In July 1976, Palestinian and German militants hijacked an Air France plane headed from France to Israel, landed it in Uganda, and threatened to kill the civilian hostages. Ugandan dictator Idi Amin provided sanctuary for the militants in the Entebbe airport. After Israel raided the Ugandan airport and rescued most of the hostages, United Nations Secretary-General Kurt Waldheim condemned Israel for the violation of "Ugandan sovereignty."

Alan Dershowitz stated that while Tibetan people, Kurds, and Turkish Armenians all desire "national liberation," the United Nations has only officially recognized Palestinian claims to "national liberation" and allows representatives of the Palestinian cause to speak at the UN. The difference between the three groups, according to Alan Dershowitz, and the Palestinians is that the Palestinians use terrorism as a tactic for getting their voice heard, while the Tibetans and Turkish Armenians do not. The UN, according to Dershowitz, favors "national liberation" groups who practice terrorism above those who do not, including those people who have been under more brutal occupation for a longer time (such as Tibetans). Dershowitz has accused the UN of allowing its refugee camps in the Palestinian territories to be used as terrorist bases.

=== Sri Lankan civil war failure ===
A review of UN action during the final months of the Sri Lankan Civil War in 2009, in which tens of thousands of people were killed, criticized the UN leadership, United Nations Security Council and top UN officials in Sri Lanka. UN staff were afraid to publicize widespread killings, top UN leaders did not intervene and the 15-member Security Council did not give "clear" orders to protect civilians, said the report.

The review, led by former UN official Charles Petrie, said senior UN staff in Sri Lanka were afraid to highlight deaths because they feared it would put at risk humanitarian access to the hundreds of thousands of civilians in the region. UN staff in Sri Lanka and New York failed to "confront" the government about obstacles to humanitarian assistance and were unwilling to "address government responsibility for attacks that were killing civilians." Rights groups have given a toll of up to 40,000 dead with most killed in army shelling.

The report said UN headquarters' talks with the 193 member states "were heavily influenced by what it perceived member states wanted to hear, rather than what member states needed to know if they were to respond." Turning to the Security Council, the report said the body had been "deeply ambivalent" about putting Sri Lanka on its conflict agenda.

Philippe Bolopion, UN director for Human Rights Watch (HRW), said the report highlighted a "dereliction of duty" and was "a call to action and reform for the entire UN system."

=== Recognition of Taiwan ===
In 1971, the Republic of China on Taiwan was forced to give up its seat at the UN to the People's Republic of China (PRC) following United Nations General Assembly Resolution 2758. The self-governed island of 23 million was barred from the United Nations and affiliated bodies like the World Health Organization while its Olympic athletes are forced to compete under the banner of Chinese Taipei. The UN recognizes the PRC as the sole legitimate government of China, and Taiwan as part of it. This has created a diplomatic gap between Taiwan and the rest of the world. Taiwan's United Nations Task Force director, Joanne Ou, has stated that "The United Nations talks about justice and human rights, yet they pretend we don't exist. It's humiliating, ridiculous and childish."

== Criticisms of scandals ==
In the book Snakes in Suits, a study of psychopaths in the workplace, Babiak and Hare write that corruption appears to be endemic at the UN:

There are few organizations in the Western world that could survive with the allegations of mismanagement, scandal, and corruption that permeate the United Nations. For many delegates, officials, and employees, particularly those from developing nations, the UN is little more than an enormous watering hole.

Concerned about its shabby image, the UN recently developed a multiple-choice "ethics quiz" for its employees. The "correct" answers were obvious to everyone [Is it all right to steal from your employer? (A) Yes, (B) No, (C) Only if you don't get caught].

The quiz was not designed to determine the ethical sense of UN employees or to weed out the ethically inept but to raise their level of integrity. How taking a transparent test could improve integrity is unclear. There has been no mention of how management and other officials did on the test.

=== Oil-for-Food Program scandal ===
In addition to criticism of the basic approach, the Oil-for-Food Programme suffered from widespread corruption and abuse. Throughout its existence, the programme was dogged by accusations that some of its profits were unlawfully diverted to the government of Iraq and to UN officials.

=== Peacekeeping child sexual abuse scandal ===
Reporters witnessed a rapid increase in prostitution in Cambodia, Mozambique, Bosnia, and Kosovo after UN and, in the case of the latter two, NATO peacekeeping forces moved in. In the 1996 UN study The Impact of Armed Conflict on Children, former first lady of Mozambique Graça Machel documented: "In 6 out of 12 country studies on sexual exploitation of children in situations of armed conflict prepared for the present report, the arrival of peacekeeping troops has been associated with a rapid rise in child prostitution."

In 2011, a United Nations spokesman confirmed sixteen Beninese peacekeepers were barred from serving with them following a year-long probe. Of the sixteen soldiers involved, ten were commanders. They failed to maintain an environment that prevents sexual exploitation and abuse. Sexual misconduct by United Nations troops had earlier been reported in Congo, Cambodia, and Haiti, as well as in an earlier incident involving Moroccan peacekeepers in Côte d'Ivoire.

=== Accountability ===
In 2007, American diplomat James Wasserstrom raised concerns about corruption amongst UN officials in Kosovo. He was dismissed from his field job and detained by UN police. He brought a case against the UN and Secretary General Ban Ki-moon, and at his tribunal the UN was directed to compensate him with US$65,000 for the wrongful dismissal.

=== Haiti cholera outbreak ===
UN aid workers from Nepal were identified as the source of a cholera outbreak which killed over 10,000 Haitians and sickened hundreds of thousands more. The UN, however, claimed diplomatic immunity and refused to provide compensation. Six years after the outbreak again, by which point more than 9,000 Haitians had already perished, then-Secretary-General Ban Ki-moon finally admitted the UN's culpability in the outbreak, saying he was "profoundly sorry". The Secretary-General promised to spend $400 million to aid the victims and to improve the nation's crumbling sanitation and water systems. As of January 2020, nearly ten years after the outbreak began, the UN has come through with only 5 percent of that amount.

== Counter-criticism ==
The International Peace Institute argued that certain allegations of weapons trafficking, support of terrorists and exploitation of resources are part of a disinformation campaign against specific peacekeeping operations. The IPI has also said that allegations against MINUSMA "have tended more toward propaganda than outright lies."

The Africa Center for Strategic Studies claims that Russia and China are the leading sponsors in "Africa-wide disinformation campaigns" against the Western world and the United Nations to "advance their geostrategic interests and shape narratives that undermine democratic processes."

== See also ==
- Criticism of the United Nations Commission on Human Rights
- Criticism of the United Nations Office on Drugs and Crime
- Criticism of UNICEF
- Defamation of religion and the United Nations
- Haiti cholera outbreak
- Nicaragua v. United States
- PassBlue

== Bibliography ==
- Carpenter, Ted Gallen, ed. Delusions of Grandeur: the United Nations and Global Intervention. Washington, D.C.: Cato Institute, 1997. ISBN 1-882577-49-3
- Lietar, Pauline, ONU: La Grande Imposture , Albin Michel, 2017. ISBN 9782226393913
- Rob Murphy, “Is the UN Security Council fit for purpose?”, POLITICS REVIEW, Volume 24, Number 4, April 2015.
- "In Australia, Fears of Chinese Meddling Rise on U.N. Bribery Case Revelation', The New York Times, May 22, 2018
- Gold, Dore. Tower of Babble: How the United Nations Has Fueled Global Chaos. New York: Three Rivers Press, 2004 ISBN 140005494X.
