= Proposals for the United States to withdraw from the United Nations =

There have been various proposals for the United States to withdraw from the United Nations, whose headquarters it hosts. The United States is a founding member of the organization as well as one of the five permanent members of the United Nations Security Council.

The United States temporarily withdrew from several UN organizations during the first presidency of Donald Trump, rejoining after the election of Joe Biden. During Trump's second term, the US withdrew from 31-UN affiliated organizations.

== History ==
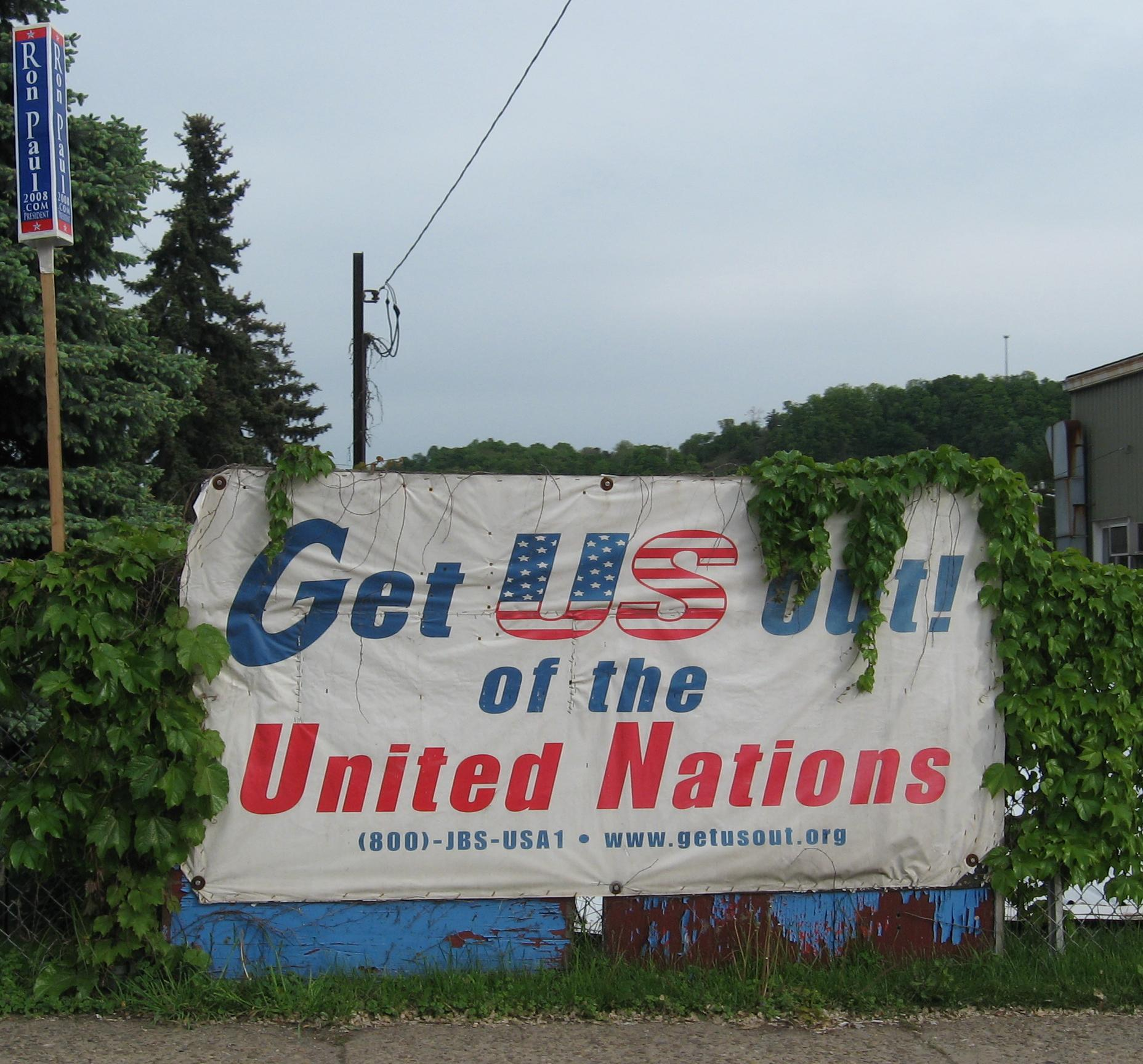
A sign advocating America's withdrawal produced by the John Birch Society

Opposition to the United Nations and its predecessor, the League of Nations, has existed from the time of its formation. At the end of World War I, isolationists in the United States were successful in blocking the U.S. Senate ratification of the Treaty of Versailles negotiated by President Woodrow Wilson and by extension U.S. participation in the League of Nations. The John Birch Society, an anti-communist group founded in 1958, was opposed to US involvement from the society's beginning. From an early date they had bumper stickers with the slogan "Get the U.S. out of the U.N. and the U.N. out of the U.S.!" Another withdrawal advocate at the time was the National Review, which once editorialized that the UN should be "liquidated".

In 2007, Utah state representative Don Bush has claimed that many programs by the supranational entity have violated the US Constitution, such as the implementation of the International Court of Justice and the Law of the Sea Treaty.

Under President Donald Trump, the U.S. withdrew from the United Nations Educational, Scientific and Cultural Organization (UNESCO) and United Nations Human Rights Council (UNHRC) in October 2017 and June 2018 respectively. The United States also announced its intention to withdraw from the World Health Organization on July 6, 2020, effective one year later. However, the withdrawals from the WHO, the UNHRC, and UNESCO were later rescinded by Trump's first term successor, president Joe Biden.

On 27 February 2021, the Alabama Republican Party passed a resolution in support of U.S. withdrawal, citing perceived UN support for abortion, disarmament of citizens, climate control policies, and influence from socialist countries.

Trump again initiated the withdrawal of the US from the WHO and UNESCO in 2025, during his second term.

On January 7, 2026, Trump signed an executive order ordering the United States to withdraw from 66 international organizations and institutions. Trump's executive order directs all executive branches to stop contributing to the funding of 31 UN-affiliated entities and 35 non-UN-affiliated organizations, including the United Nations Framework Convention on Climate Change (UNFCCC), the United Nations Population Fund (UNFPA), and dozens of others. Explaining the US withdrawal from 66 international organizations, US Secretary of State Marco Rubio said: "The Trump administration has concluded that these institutions either have duplicate missions, are mismanaged, are unnecessary, costly and ineffective, are influenced by actors who act in the interests and agendas contrary to ours, or are a threat to the sovereignty, freedoms and overall well-being of our country." He went on to state that these institutions "no longer serve the interests of the United States" and that "President Trump is making it clear that it is no longer acceptable to waste the American people's money on the institutions from which we have withdrawn."

== Public opinion ==
According to the polling organization Rasmussen Reports, in the year 2004 a minority of 44% of United States citizens had a favorable view of the United Nations. This number continued to decline steadily, and two years later in 2006 that number had fallen to 31%. As of 2006, 26% of Americans say "the U.S. should not be involved" with the United Nations, with a moderate majority of 57% supporting remaining a member. The 2006 poll surveyed 1,000 adults. A 2008 poll by the Chicago Council on Global Affairs shows that 39% find it "very important" and 21% "not important" to strengthen the U.N.

In 2013, a Media and Public Opinion Research Group poll found that 38% of Americans would like less involvement with the UN. Some ranking leaders of the United Nations have suggested that the United States government has been projecting a negative image of the UN, although this allegation is denied by the US. Few observers expect the "U.S. out of U.N." movement to result in the US actually withdrawing for the foreseeable future.

Despite criticisms, the majority of Americans (88%) support active engagement in the United Nations, as evidenced by a non-partisan poll conducted after the 2016 election.

Some controversy occurred in 1996 when U.S. Army medic Michael New protested the United Nations by refusing to wear the U.N. insignia on his uniform during a United Nations Protection Force peacekeeping mission to Macedonia during the Yugoslav Wars. Michael New faced a court martial and was subsequently dishonorably discharged for his disobedience to his commanding officer; to this day he still has the belief that he was correct to refuse service under the United Nations.

== Legislation ==
In 1997 legislation H.R.1146 was introduced in the United States House of Representatives by Congressman Ron Paul of Texas under the label "American Sovereignty Restoration Act". In addition to withdrawal, the bill also proposed expelling the United Nations Headquarters from its territory within New York City and no longer providing the large plurality of funds which the US contributes to the UN annually.

No funds are authorized to be appropriated or otherwise made available for assessed or voluntary contributions of the United States to the United Nations or any organ, specialized agency, commission or other formally affiliated body thereof, except that funds may be appropriated to facilitate withdrawal of United States personnel and equipment. Upon termination of United States membership, no payments shall be made to the United Nations or any organ, specialized agency, commission or other formally affiliated body thereof, out of any funds appropriated prior to such termination or out of any other funds available for such purposes.

— American Sovereignty Restoration Act, United States House of Representatives, 1999.

The bill was met with minimal support. Further legislation has been suggested, although none has been organized in the form of a comprehensive bill. H.R.1146 was reintroduced in every Congressional Session by Rep. Paul from 1997 through 2011. Ron Paul retired from the United States House of Representatives at the start of the 2013-2014 session. At that time, the reintroduction of H.R.1146 was taken up by other representatives: in 2013 by Rep. Paul Broun of Georgia, under the designation H.R.75, and in 2015 by Rep. Mike Rogers of Alabama, under the designation H.R.1205. In each of these cases, the bill was met with minimal support, and referred to committee with no further action taken. Most recently, in 2017 a similar piece of legislation was introduced by Rep. Rogers, under the designation H.R.193.

In December 2023, U.S. Senator Mike Lee and U.S. Representative Chip Roy introduced UN withdrawal legislation titled the "Disengaging Entirely from the United Nations Debacle (DEFUND) Act." The legislation was closely modeled on the ASRA.

=== State legislation ===
Sporadic efforts of a similar nature have been attempted in some state legislatures around the country. For instance, on January 19, 1995 a piece of legislation was introduced by Utah state representative Don Bush titled "The National Security Revitalization Act" which called on the US Congress to restrict participation in UN peacekeeping operations.

By passing the NSRA, Congress will take an important first step toward changing this image and restoring America's reputation as a superpower that will defend, dependently, if necessary its national security interests around the world. The legislation is substantial, and passage as it stands would mark an immediate improvement in U.S. foreign and defense policy. Specifically, the Act: 0 Acknowledges the decline in American military readiness that has occurred since 1992. Restricts future participation by U.S. troops in United Nations military operations.

— The National Security Revitalization Act, Utah House of Representatives, 1995.

It was similar in form to bill H.R. 1146, although it had far more provisions such as a reaffirmation of the US support for NATO, and was therefore not exclusively a withdrawal bill. State representative Bush claimed "I had about 25 legislators that signed up for it and there was a lot of other support. The leadership in the House kept it from coming out on the floor." The bill was never brought to a vote.

In 2023, Tennessee enacted legislation to block the implementation of programs "originating in, or traceable to, the United Nations or a subsidiary entity of the United Nations."

== Unilateralism ==
Unilateralism has had a long history in the United States. In his famous and influential Farewell Address, George Washington, the first President of the United States, warned that the United States should "steer clear of permanent alliances with any portion of the foreign world". Many years later, this approach was labeled as isolationism, but some historians of American diplomacy have long argued that "isolationism" is a misnomer, and that American foreign policy, beginning with Washington, has traditionally been driven by unilateralism. Recent works that have made this argument include Walter A. McDougall's Promised Land, Crusader State (1997) and John Lewis Gaddis's Surprise, Security, and the American Experience (2004). Advocates of American unilateralism argue that other countries should not have "veto power" over matters of U.S. national security. Presidential Candidate John Kerry received heavy political heat after saying, during a presidential debate, that American national security actions must pass a "global test". This was interpreted by Kerry's opponents as a proposal to submit American foreign policy to approval by other countries. Proponents of American unilateralism generally believe that a multilateral institution, such as the United Nations, is morally suspect because, they argue, it treats non-democratic, and even despotic, regimes as being as legitimate as democratic countries, and withdrawing from the United Nations would be a symbolic move at further distancing the United States from foreign control.

== See also ==
- Withdrawal from the United Nations
- Foreign relations of the United States
- United States and the United Nations
- United States withdrawal from the Paris Agreement
- United States withdrawal from the Joint Comprehensive Plan of Action
- List of vetoed United Nations Security Council resolutions
- International organization membership of the United States
