= International affairs budget of the United States =

Foreign affairs budget of the U.S. government

The United States international affairs budget (also known as Function 150 or the 150 Account) funds the diplomacy, development aid, and security assistance of the United States, generally comprising about 1% of total federal spending.

== Overview ==
Congress typically considers twelve distinct appropriations measures on an annual basis to fund federal programs and activities. One of these twelve measures funds U.S. nondefense international affairs activities. Between FY 2008 and FY 2025, this appropriation was referred to as the Department of State, Foreign Operations, and Related Programs (SFOPS) appropriations bill. Since FY 2026, this appropriation has been known as the National Security, Department of State, and Related Programs (NSRP) appropriations bill. Annual NSRP appropriations historically have supported a range of U.S. activities around the world, including the operation of U.S. embassies, foreign assistance, U.S. participation in multilateral organizations, and U.S. export promotion activities, among others. The NSRP appropriation closely aligns with the International Affairs budget function (150), which typically represents about 1% of the annual federal budget.

Federal spending for international affairs historically covered agencies such as the State Department, the United States Agency for International Development (USAID), the United States Agency for Global Media (USAGM), the Peace Corps, and the Millennium Challenge Corporation.

== Components ==
As of 2026, the international affairs budget is broken down into the following components:

- Administration of Foreign Affairs
- State Programs
- Diplomatic Programs (including Ongoing Operations and Worldwide Security Protection)
- Capital Investment Fund
- Consular and Border Security Programs
- Embassy Security, Construction, and Maintenance
- Other Administration of Foreign Affairs
  - Office of the Inspector General
  - Educational and Cultural Exchange Programs
  - Representation Expenses
  - Protection of Foreign Missions and Officials
  - Emergencies in the Diplomatic and Consular Service
  - Repatriation Loans Program Account
  - Payment to the American Institute in Taiwan
  - International Communications Activities
- Contributions to International Organizations
- International Chancery Center
- International Commissions
  - International Boundary and Water Commission
  - International Joint Commission
  - International Boundary Commission
  - International Fisheries Commissions
- U.S. Agency for Global Media
- United States Institute of Peace
- Bilateral Economic Assistance (including Global Health Programs and International Humanitarian Assistance)
- Peace Corps
- Millennium Challenge Corporation
- Department of the Treasury International Affairs Technical Assistance
- International Security Assistance (including International Narcotics Control and Law Enforcement and Foreign Military Financing)
- Multilateral Development Banks and Related Funds
  - International Bank for Reconstruction and Development
  - International Development Association
  - African Development Bank
  - Inter-American Development Bank
  - Inter-American Investment Corporation
  - International Fund for Agricultural Development
  - European Bank for Reconstruction and Development
- Export and Investment Assistance
  - Export-Import Bank
  - Development Finance Corporation
  - U.S. Trade and Development Agency
- International Trade Commission
- Other Commissions
  - United States Commission for the Preservation of America's Heritage Abroad
  - Foreign Claims Settlement Commission

== Congressional budget justifications ==
Fiscal year	Requested amount	Request made by
FY 1994	$21.6 billion	Clinton administration
FY 1998	$19.45 billion	Clinton administration
FY 1999	$20.15 billion	Clinton administration
FY 2000	$21.31 billion	Clinton administration
FY 2002	$23.9 billion	Bush administration
FY 2003	$25.42 billion	Bush administration
FY 2004	$28.51 billion	Bush administration
FY 2005	$31.51 billion	Bush administration
FY 2006	$33.63 billion	Bush administration
FY 2007	$35.11 billion	Bush administration
FY 2008	$36.18 billion	Bush administration
FY 2009	$39.49 billion	Bush administration
FY 2010	$53.87 billion	Obama administration
FY 2011	$52.8 billion	Obama administration
FY 2012	$55.7 billion	Obama administration
FY 2013	$51.6 billion	Obama administration
FY 2014	$47.8 billion	Obama administration
FY 2015	$46.2 billion	Obama administration
FY 2016	$50.3 billion	Obama administration
FY 2017	$50.1 billion	Obama administration
FY 2018	$37.6 billion	First Trump administration
FY 2019	$37.8 billion	First Trump administration
FY 2020	$40 billion	First Trump administration
FY 2021	$41 billion	First Trump administration
FY 2022	$58.5 billion	Biden administration
FY 2023	$60.4 billion	Biden administration
FY 2024	$63.1 billion	Biden administration
FY 2025	$58.8 billion	Biden administration
FY 2026	$28.5 billion	Second Trump administration
FY 2027	$33.6 billion	Second Trump administration

== See also ==
- United States federal budget
- United States intelligence budget
- Military budget of the United States
- Government spending in the United States
- Appropriations bill (United States)
- National Defense Authorization Act
- United States Department of State
- United States House Appropriations Subcommittee on National Security, Department of State, and Related Programs
- United States Senate Appropriations Subcommittee on State, Foreign Operations, and Related Programs
- United States foreign aid
- Bureau of Budget and Planning
- International organization membership of the United States
