= United States House Appropriations Subcommittee on National Security, Department of State, and Related Programs =

US House committee

Subcommittee of Committee on Appropriations
- Active United States House of Representatives; 119th Congress

Leadership
- Chair: Mario Díaz-Balart (R)
- Ranking Member: Lois Frankel (D)

Structure
- Seats: 11 (11 currently filled) 7/7 4/4
- Political parties: Majority (7): Republican (7); Minority (4): Democratic (4)

Meeting place
- HT2, The Capitol; Washington, D.C. 20515

Phone number
- (202)-225-2041

The House Subcommittee on National Security, Department of State, and Related Programs is a standing subcommittee within the House Appropriations Committee. Prior to 2008, it was known as the Subcommittee on Foreign Operations, Export Financing, and Related Programs. Prior to 2025, it was known as the Subcommittee on State, Foreign Operations, and Related Programs.

The United States House Committee on Appropriations has joint jurisdiction with the United States Senate Committee on Appropriations over all appropriations bills in the United States Congress. Each committee has 12 matching subcommittees, each of which is tasked with working on one of the twelve annual regular appropriations bills. This subcommittee has jurisdiction over the budget for the United States Department of State and any Foreign Operations.

== Appropriations process ==
Traditionally, after a federal budget for the upcoming fiscal year has been passed, the appropriations subcommittees receive information about what the budget sets as their spending ceilings. This is called "302(b) allocations" after section 302(b) of the Congressional Budget Act of 1974. That amount is separated into smaller amounts for each of the twelve Subcommittees. The federal budget does not become law and is not signed by the President. Instead, it is guide for the House and the Senate in making appropriations and tax decisions. However, no budget is required and each chamber has procedures in place for what to do without one. The House and Senate now consider appropriations bills simultaneously, although originally the House went first. The House Committee on Appropriations usually reports the appropriations bills in May and June and the Senate in June. Any differences between appropriations bills passed by the House and the Senate are resolved in the fall.

== Appropriations bills ==
An appropriations bill is a bill that appropriates (gives to, sets aside for) money to specific federal government departments, agencies, and programs. The money provides funding for operations, personnel, equipment, and activities. Regular appropriations bills are passed annually, with the funding they provide covering one fiscal year. The fiscal year is the accounting period of the federal government, which runs from October 1 to September 30 of the following year.

There are three types of appropriations bills: regular appropriations bills, continuing resolutions, and supplemental appropriations bills. Regular appropriations bills are the twelve standard bills that cover the funding for the federal government for one fiscal year and that are supposed to be enacted into law by October 1. If Congress has not enacted the regular appropriations bills by the time, it can pass a continuing resolution, which continues the pre-existing appropriations at the same levels as the previous fiscal year (or with minor modifications) for a set amount of time. The third type of appropriations bills are supplemental appropriations bills, which add additional funding above and beyond what was originally appropriated at the beginning of the fiscal year. Supplemental appropriations bills can be used for things like disaster relief.

Appropriations bills are one part of a larger United States budget and spending process. They are preceded in that process by the president's budget proposal, congressional budget resolutions, and the 302(b) allocation. Article One of the United States Constitution, section 9, clause 7, states that "No money shall be drawn from the Treasury, but in Consequence of Appropriations made by Law..." This is what gives Congress the power to make these appropriations. The President, however, still has the power to veto appropriations bills.

== Members, 119th Congress ==
Majority	Minority
Mario Diaz-Balart, Florida, Chair; Guy Reschenthaler, Pennsylvania; Julia Letlow, Louisiana; Juan Ciscomani, Arizona; Chuck Edwards, North Carolina, Vice Chair; John Moolenaar, Michigan; Mark Alford, Missouri	Lois Frankel, Florida, Ranking Member; Grace Meng, New York; Norma Torres, California; Mike Quigley, Illinois
Ex officio
Tom Cole, Oklahoma	Rosa DeLauro, Connecticut

== Historical membership rosters ==
=== 115th Congress ===
Majority	Minority
Hal Rogers, Kentucky, Chairman; Kay Granger, Texas; Mario Díaz-Balart, Florida; Charlie Dent, Pennsylvania, Vice Chair; Tom Rooney, Florida; Jeff Fortenberry, Nebraska; Chris Stewart, Utah	Nita Lowey, New York, Ranking Member; Barbara Lee, California; Dutch Ruppersberger, Maryland; Grace Meng, New York; David Price, North Carolina
Ex officio
Rodney Frelinghuysen, New Jersey	

=== 116th Congress ===
Majority	Minority
Nita Lowey, New York, Chair; Barbara Lee, California, Vice Chair; Grace Meng, New York; David Price, North Carolina; Lois Frankel, Florida; Norma Torres, California	Hal Rogers, Kentucky, Ranking Member; Jeff Fortenberry, Nebraska; Martha Roby, Alabama
Ex officio
	Kay Granger, Texas

=== 117th Congress ===
Majority	Minority
Barbara Lee, California, Chair; Grace Meng, New York, Vice Chair; David Price, North Carolina; Lois Frankel, Florida; Norma Torres, California; Adriano Espaillat, New York; Jennifer Wexton, Virginia	Hal Rogers, Kentucky, Ranking Member; Mario Diaz-Balart, Florida; Jeff Fortenberry, Nebraska; Guy Reschenthaler, Pennsylvania
Ex officio
Rosa DeLauro, Connecticut	Kay Granger, Texas

=== 118th Congress ===
Majority	Minority
Mario Diaz-Balart, Florida, Chair; Hal Rogers, Kentucky; Chris Stewart, Utah; Guy Reschenthaler, Pennsylvania; Chuck Fleischmann, Tennessee; Jake LaTurner, Kansas; Jerry Carl, Alabama	Barbara Lee, California, Ranking Member; Grace Meng, New York; Lois Frankel, Florida; Norma Torres, California
Ex officio
Kay Granger, Texas	Rosa DeLauro, Connecticut

== See also ==
- United States Senate Appropriations Subcommittee on State, Foreign Operations, and Related Programs
