= International Chancery Center =

Diplomatic enclave in Washington, D.C.

The International Chancery Center (ICC), authorized by the International Center Act of 1968, is a diplomatic enclave in Washington, D.C. that houses at least 16 chanceries belonging to foreign missions.

== History ==
The International Chancery Center (ICC) was originally conceived in the early 1960s by William Crockett, former Deputy Assistant Secretary of State for Management. At that time, the Department of State was receiving numerous requests from foreign governments for assistance with locating suitable sites in the District of Columbia for their chanceries. As an effort to encourage the location of chanceries into new parts of the District, the ICC was developed as an enclave of chanceries on Federal property.

The ICC’s campus consists of 47 acres along the intersection of Connecticut Avenue and Van Ness Street NW, on a portion of what was formerly the headquarters of the National Bureau of Standards. The Center is now the home to 16 foreign embassies.

The ICC is now located at 3507 International Place, NW. The building’s design was inspired by the traditional styling of the late 19th century chanceries located in the District of Columbia. Countries with chanceries at the ICC are also required to design and maintain in accordance with established design guidelines and pursuant to the approval by the Department of State’s Office of Foreign Missions, the National Capital Planning Commission, and the Commission of Fine Arts.

The design of the ICC’s gardens and parks have received several awards over the years, including an Environmental Landscape Distinction Award (1990) and an Excellence in Landscape Award (1995).

== Funding ==
Fees collected from other executive agencies in accordance with section 4 of the International Center Act and proceeds from past leases to 19 foreign governments fund most activity at the ICC. These proceeds are deposited into a trust fund that is drawn upon, as authorized by Congress, for development, maintenance, repairs, and security at the site. In addition, the Act authorizes the use of proceeds for surveys and planning related to the development of locations within the District of Columbia for diplomatic purposes.

In its FY 2027 budget request to Congress, the Trump administration requested $745,000 to fund routine maintenance and repairs of the ICC common ground areas.

== Future ==
As of 2026, the Department of State owns approximately 32 acres (13.22 hectares) of the former Walter Reed Army Medical Center in the northern portion of the District of Columbia, near the border with Silver Spring, Maryland (at the intersection of 16th Street, NW, and Alaska Avenue, facing Rock Creek Park). The Department is developing this property into a chancery center similar to the ICC called the Foreign Mission Center (FMC).
