= International organization membership of the United States =

List of UN and other international organizations that the U.S. is a member of

The following is a list of international organizations in which the United States of America officially participates.

== Memberships ==
- Agreement between the United States of America, the United Mexican States, and Canada (USMCA)
- African Development Bank (AfDB)
- Antarctic Treaty System (ATS)
- Asian Development Bank (ADB) (nonregional member)
- Asia-Pacific Economic Cooperation (APEC)
- Australia Group
- Australia-New Zealand-United States Security Treaty (ANZUS)
- Bank for International Settlements (BIS)
- Board of Peace
- C5+1
- Conference on Disarmament (CD)
- Dominican Republic–Central America Free Trade Agreement (CAFTA-DR)
- Euro-Atlantic Partnership Council (EAPC)
- European Bank for Reconstruction and Development (EBRD)
- Fédération Internationale de Football Association (FIFA)
- Group of Seven (G7)
- Group of Ten (G10)
- Group of Twenty Finance Ministers and Central Bank Governors (G20)
- Inter-American Development Bank (IADB)
- International Boundary and Water Commission (IBWC)
- International Boundary Commission
- International Chamber of Commerce (ICC)
- International Criminal Police Organization (Interpol)
- International Energy Agency (IEA)
- International Federation of Red Cross and Red Crescent Societies (IFRCS)
- International Grains Council (IGC)
- International Hydrographic Organization (IHO)
- International Joint Commission
- International Mobile Satellite Organization (IMSO)
- International Olympic Committee (IOC)
- International Organization for Standardization (ISO)
- International Red Cross and Red Crescent Movement (ICRM)
- International Telecommunications Satellite Organization (ITSO)
- International Trade Union Confederation (ITUC)
- North Atlantic Treaty Organization (NATO)
- Nuclear Energy Agency (NEA)
- Nuclear Suppliers Group (NSG)
- Organisation for Economic Co-operation and Development (OECD)
- Organization for Security and Cooperation in Europe (OSCE)
- Organisation for the Prohibition of Chemical Weapons (OPCW)
- Organization of American States (OAS)
- Pacific Community (SPC)
- Paris Club
- Permanent Court of Arbitration (PCA)
- Quadrilateral Security Dialogue (Quad)
- Shield of the Americas
- United Nations (UN) - Membership in the UN includes participation in the UN's Six Principal Organs: the General Assembly, Secretariat, International Court of Justice, Security Council, Economic and Social Council, and Trusteeship Council.
- United Nations System
  - Food and Agriculture Organization (FAO)
  - International Atomic Energy Agency (IAEA)
  - International Civil Aviation Organization (ICAO)
  - International Fund for Agricultural Development (IFAD)
  - International Labour Organization (ILO)
  - International Maritime Organization (IMO)
  - International Monetary Fund (IMF)
  - International Organization for Migration (IOM)
  - International Telecommunication Union (ITU)
  - Preparatory Commission for the Comprehensive Nuclear-Test-Ban Treaty Organization (CTBTO Preparatory Commission)
  - United Nations Children's Fund (UNICEF)
  - United Nations Committee on the Peaceful Uses of Outer Space (COPUOS)
  - United Nations Conference on Trade and Development (UNCTAD)
  - United Nations High Commissioner for Refugees (UNHCR)
  - United Nations Mission for Justice Support in Haiti (INUJUSTH)
  - United Nations Truce Supervision Organization (UNTSO)
  - Universal Postal Union (UPU)
  - World Bank Group (WBG)
    - International Bank for Reconstruction and Development (IBRD)
    - International Centre for Settlement of Investment Disputes (ICSID)
    - International Development Association (IDA)
    - International Finance Corporation (IFC)
    - Multilateral Investment Guarantee Agency (MIGA)
  - World Food Programme (WFP)
  - World Intellectual Property Organization (WIPO)
  - World Meteorological Organization (WMO)
- World Trade Organization (WTO)
- World Customs Organization (WCO)
- World Organization of the Scout Movement (WOSM)
- World Veterans Federation (WVF)
- Zangger Committee (ZC)

== Observer status ==
- Association of Southeast Asian Nations (ASEAN) (dialogue partner)
- Black Sea Economic Cooperation Zone (BSEC) (observer)
- Council of Europe (CE) (observer)
- Council of the Baltic Sea States (CBSS) (observer)
- European Organization for Nuclear Research (CERN) (observer)
- Pacific Islands Forum (PIF) (dialogue partner)
- South Asian Association for Regional Cooperation (SAARC) (observer)
- Southeast European Cooperative Initiative (SECI) (observer)

== Currently withdrawing ==
- United Nations Educational, Scientific and Cultural Organization (UNESCO) - full withdrawal effective December 31, 2026
- United Nations Relief and Works Agency for Palestine Refugees in the Near East (UNRWA)
- Group of States against Corruption (GRECO) - full withdrawal effective December 31 2026

As per presidential memorandum signed on January 7, 2026:

- Non-United Nations Organizations:
  - 24/7 Carbon-Free Energy Compact
  - Colombo Plan Council
  - Commission for Environmental Cooperation
  - Education Cannot Wait
  - European Centre of Excellence for Countering Hybrid Threats
  - Forum of European National Highway Research Laboratories
  - Freedom Online Coalition
  - Global Community Engagement and Resilience Fund
  - Global Counterterrorism Forum
  - Global Forum on Cyber Expertise
  - Global Forum on Migration and Development
  - Inter-American Institute for Global Change Research
  - Intergovernmental Forum on Mining, Minerals, Metals, and Sustainable Development
  - Intergovernmental Panel on Climate Change
  - Intergovernmental Science-Policy Platform on Biodiversity and Ecosystem Services
  - International Centre for the Study of the Preservation and Restoration of Cultural Property
  - International Cotton Advisory Committee
  - International Development Law Organization
  - International Energy Forum
  - International Federation of Arts Councils and Culture Agencies
  - International Institute for Democracy and Electoral Assistance
  - International Institute for Justice and the Rule of Law
  - International Lead and Zinc Study Group
  - International Renewable Energy Agency
  - International Solar Alliance
  - International Tropical Timber Organization
  - International Union for Conservation of Nature
  - Pan American Institute of Geography and History
  - Partnership for Atlantic Cooperation
  - Regional Cooperation Agreement on Combating Piracy and Armed Robbery against Ships in Asia
  - Regional Cooperation Council
  - Renewable Energy Policy Network for the 21st Century
  - Science and Technology Center in Ukraine
  - Secretariat of the Pacific Regional Environment Programme
  - Venice Commission of the Council of Europe
- United Nations (UN) Organizations:
  - United Nations Department of Economic and Social Affairs
  - United Nations Economic Commission for Africa
  - United Nations Economic Commission for Latin America and the Caribbean
  - United Nations Economic and Social Commission for Asia and the Pacific
  - United Nations Economic and Social Commission for Western Asia
  - International Law Commission
  - International Residual Mechanism for Criminal Tribunals
  - International Trade Centre
  - Office of the Special Adviser on Africa
  - Office of the Special Representative of the Secretary General for Children in Armed Conflict
  - Office of the Special Representative of the Secretary-General on Sexual Violence in Conflict
  - Office of the Special Representative of the Secretary-General on Violence Against Children
  - Peacebuilding Commission
  - Peacebuilding Fund
  - Permanent Forum on People of African Descent
  - UN Alliance of Civilizations
  - UN Collaborative Programme on Reducing Emissions from Deforestation and Forest Degradation in Developing Countries
  - UN Conference on Trade and Development
  - UN Democracy Fund
  - UN-Energy
  - UN Entity for Gender Equality and the Empowerment of Women
  - UN Framework Convention on Climate Change
  - UN Human Settlements Programme
  - UN Institute for Training and Research
  - United Nations-Oceans
  - UN Population Fund
  - UN Register of Conventional Arms
  - UN System Chief Executives Board for Coordination
  - United Nations System Staff College
  - UN-Water
  - UN University

== Withdrawn ==
- World Health Organization (WHO) - effective January 20, 2025
- United Nations Human Rights Council (UNHRC) - effective February 4, 2025
- Paris Agreement (Paris Climate Accords) - effective January 27, 2026

== Notably absent ==
- International Criminal Court - Signed treaty, but did not ratify (December 31, 2000). Withdrew signature (May 6, 2002). See also United States and the International Criminal Court.

== See also ==
- United States Department of State
- Foreign policy of the United States
- Foreign relations of the United States
- United States and the United Nations
- United States Mission to the United Nations
- United States withdrawal from the United Nations
- International affairs budget of the United States
- List of the United States treaties
- List of treaties unsigned or unratified by the United States
- Free trade agreements of the United States
- History of the foreign policy of the United States
- United States and the League of Nations; the US never joined
- United States non-interventionism
