= United States Mission to the United Nations =

United States delegation

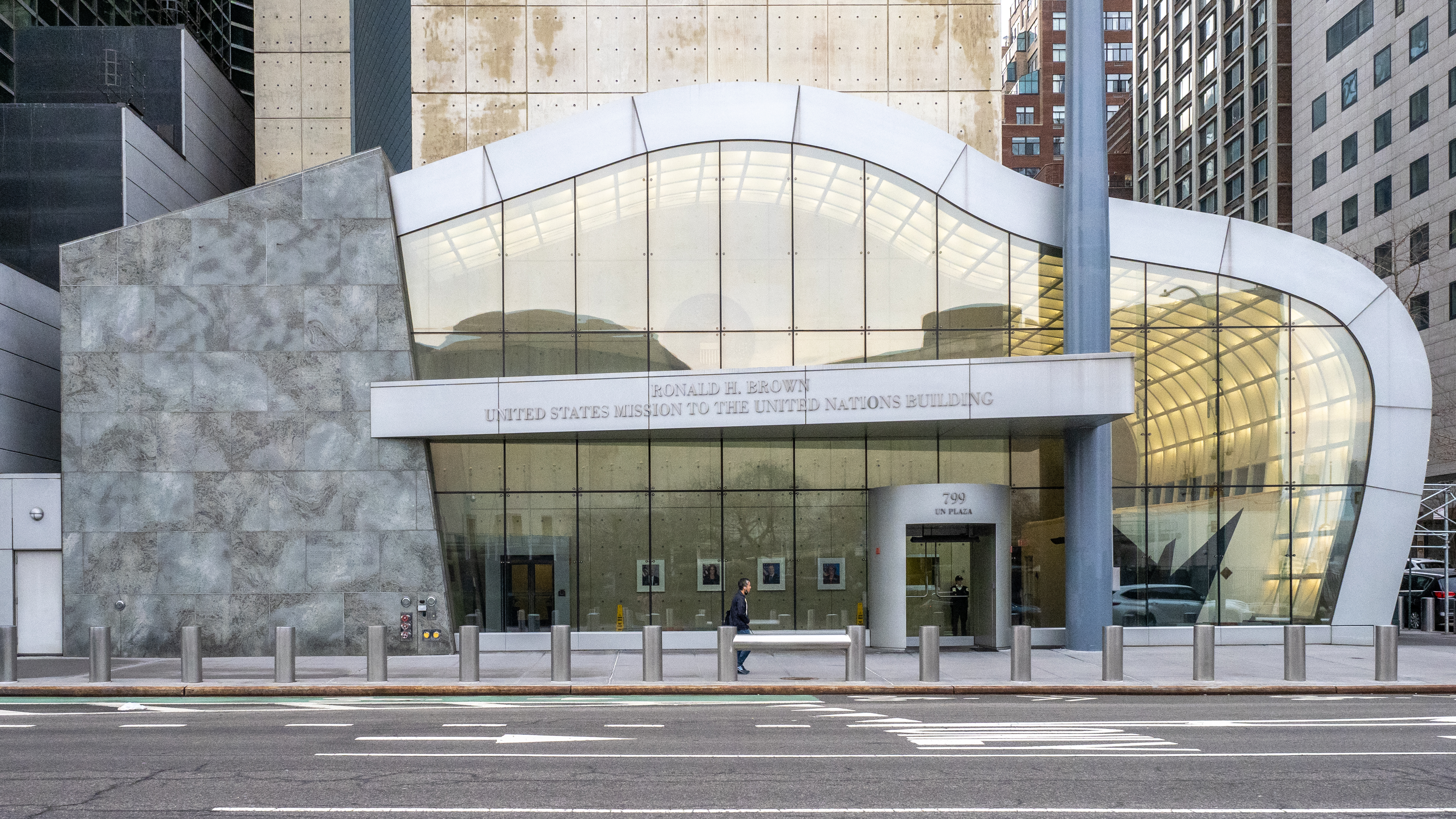
- Ronald H. Brown United States Mission to the United Nations Building
- Location: New York City, United States
- Address: 799 United Nations Plaza, New York, NY 10017
- Coordinates: 40°45′03″N 73°58′08″W
- Opened: 1947
- Permanent representative: Mike Waltz, Ambassador
- Website: usun.usmission.gov

The United States Mission to the United Nations (USUN) serves as the United States delegation to the United Nations (UN). USUN is responsible for carrying out the nation's participation in the world body. In 1947, the United States Mission was created by an act of Congress to assist the president and the Department of State in conducting United States policy at the United Nations. Since that time, USUN has served a vital role as the Department of State's UN branch. Today, USUN has approximately 150 people on staff who serve to represent the United States' political, economic social, legal, military, public diplomacy, and management interests at the United Nations.

USUN is divided into the following sections: Executive; Washington; Political; Management and Reform; Economic and Social; Legal; Military Staff; Public Affairs; Host Country; Management; and Security.

The United States Mission to the United Nations is located at 799 United Nations Plaza (between East 44th and 45th streets on First Avenue) across the street from United Nations headquarters.

== Leadership ==
There are several major leadership roles in the U.S. Mission. The primary role, United States ambassador to the United Nations, is the leader of the U.S. Mission to the United Nations. The position is more formally known by the exact title: Permanent Representative of the United States of America to the United Nations, with the rank and status of Ambassador Extraordinary and Plenipotentiary, and Representative of the United States of America in the Security Council of the United Nations. The position is also known as simply the U.S. Permanent Representative, or "Perm Rep", to the United Nations.

The U.S. permanent representative, currently Mike Waltz, is charged with representing the United States on the UN Security Council and during almost all plenary meetings of the General Assembly, except in the rare situation in which a more senior officer of the United States (such as the U.S. secretary of state or the president of the United States) is present. Like all United States ambassadors, the U.S. Permanent Representative must be nominated by the U.S. president and confirmed by the Senate.

Many prominent U.S. politicians and diplomats have held the post, including Henry Cabot Lodge Jr., Adlai Stevenson, George H. W. Bush, Daniel Patrick Moynihan, Dr. Jeane Kirkpatrick, Richard Holbrooke, Dr. Madeleine Albright, Bill Richardson and John Danforth.

It was a cabinet-level position under the Clinton administration and the Obama administration, but no longer held that status under the first Trump administration. It was returned to cabinet-level under the Biden administration, but lost its status again under the second Trump administration. It was not a cabinet-level position under the George W. Bush administration (from 2001 to 2009).

Additionally, there are four additional representatives appointed by the president of the United States to serve on the United Nations General Assembly, two acting as Congressional representatives to the United Nations and two non-Congressional members. The Biden administration has named Tom Carnahan and Sim Farar as representatives of the United States to the General Assembly of the United Nations who are not members of Congress.

The other leadership roles are also known as UN ambassadors, but with specific titles related to which offices of the UN they handle.

== Congressional Representatives to the United Nations ==
The U.S. president also appoints two members of Congress. Members are selected by the United States House of Representatives and/or United States Senate – one Democrat and one Republican from each chamber – as Congressional Representatives to the United Nations General Assembly. The position is regulated by Section 2(a) of the United Nations Participation Act (UNPA), which stipulates that the President can appoint no more than five members of Congress to the General Assembly with the advice and consent of the Senate and that members appointed to the Assembly can not be compensated for their service in the Assembly. The UNPA does not specify the duties of Congressional Representatives, but they generally act as observers in the committee proceedings and formal gatherings of UN General Assembly members and heads of state. As outlined in UNPA, the President, with the advice and consent of the Senate, may designate congressional representatives.

=== Committee selection ===
Both the House Foreign Affairs Committee (HFAC) and Senate Foreign Relations Committee (SFRC) have, at different times, documented procedures for selecting congressional representatives. In practice, the process appears to be informal and has varied over time depending on the priorities and preferences of committee leadership.

- House of Representatives: HFAC does not appear to have a formal process for selecting congressional representatives to the General Assembly. Based on past practice, it has assigned one Member from each political party based on seniority, starting with those who have not served as representatives; however, in recent years, HFAC members have increasingly selected participants based on the Member’s level of interest in U.N.-related issues and availability to attend the session.
- Senate: Similar to the House, SFRC also does not appear to have a formal process for selecting congressional representatives to the Assembly. In practice, the chairperson and ranking member select the representatives, who are usually chosen from among SFRC members. Similar to the House, congressional representatives from the Senate appear to be selected based on their interest in U.N. issues and availability.

The Senate Foreign Relations Committee has developed a policy of not holding hearings for temporary or part-time positions, including General Assembly representatives. Instead, both the HFAC and SFRC have annually provided the President with their choices, who are then nominated by the President and confirmed by the vote of the full Senate.

== Building ==
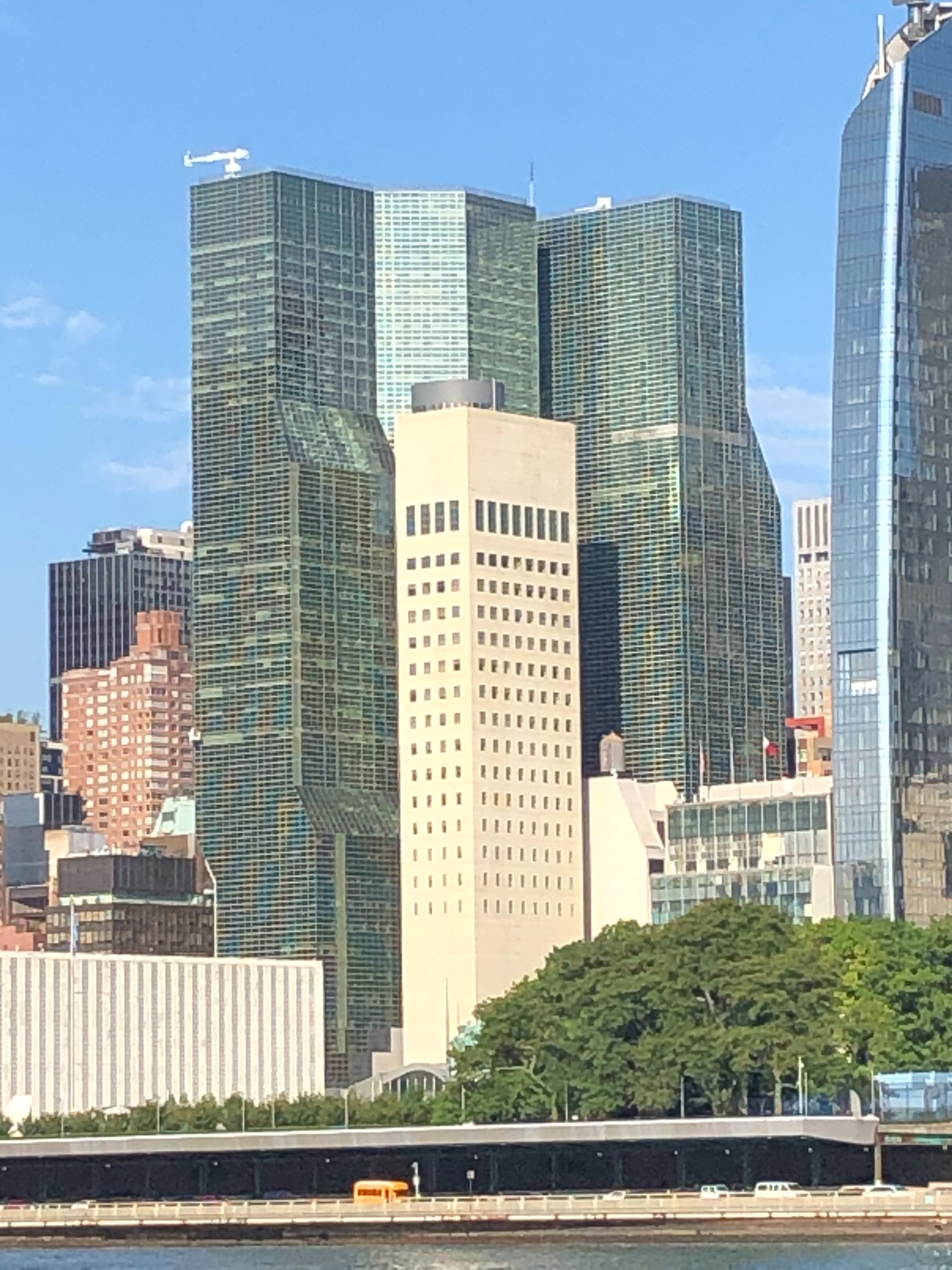
The United States Mission to the United Nations (beige tower in center)

The Ronald H. Brown United States Mission to the United Nations Building, located at First Avenue and East 45th Street in Turtle Bay, Manhattan, was dedicated on March 29, 2011. The lead architect was Gwathmey Siegel & Associates Architects' Charles Gwathmey, who died in 2009, approximately two years before the structure was completed. Former U.S. Permanent Representative Susan Rice thanked Gwathmey in her remarks at the dedication ceremony. Gwathmey's firm said that they wanted to design "an iconic tower that would transcend strict programmatic and technical constraints, and become a compelling and representative landmark for architecture and democracy".

Although the mission's building was designed before the September 11 attacks, security concerns were prioritized in the building's design due to the earlier 1998 United States embassy bombings and USS Cole bombing. The United States post-9/11 era only amplified those concerns. For example, the building was built with 30-inch (760 mm) thick walls and was intended to be able to withstand an explosion from a car bomb. In that scenario, the windowless bottom six floors would help prevent injury from flying glass shards.

The New York Times' architecture critic Herbert Muschamp positively reviewed the building, which he called "essentially a high-rise bomb shelter":

I'm for Gwathmey's design because, for once in a very long time, a building doesn't shrink from reminding us that [...] architecture is inherently aggressive. Space is invariably gained at the expense of views, sky, memories, history, emptiness, and the desires of those outside the walls. In renderings, the mission's window-washing apparatus resembles heavy artillery. This equipment won't be visible from the street, but the rendering may give some viewers a fleeting perception that high rises throughout history have performed the role of strategic defense, even when they're made of glass. With so much space in this town dedicated to buildings that don't even tell entertaining lies about themselves, there's room for a few that are upfront. New York is itself a sacrificial facade: it can absorb and even benefit from aesthetic shocks.

Conversely, the New York Magazine's equivalent critic Justin Davidson criticized the building's "stark, medieval look", adding that "Gwathmey's bunker may function perfectly [if attacked], but as an icon of democracy, it can only fail."

The building replaced a Modernist building with a honeycombed concrete exterior designed by Kahn & Jacobs and Kelly & Gruzen that opened in May 1961. Its design was acclaimed for its time, but by the early 2000s The Washington Post noted that it was widely derided, including being described by Germany's ambassador to the UN as "ugly".

== See also ==
- Foreign policy of the United States
- Foreign relations of the United States
- History of the foreign policy of the United States
- International organization membership of the United States
- United States and the United Nations
