= United States and the United Nations =

United States of America

United Nations membership
- Membership: Full member
- Since: October 24, 1945
- UNSC seat: Permanent
- Permanent Representative: Mike Waltz

The United States is a charter member of the United Nations and one of five permanent members of the UN Security Council.

The United States boasts the headquarters of the United Nations, which includes the usual meeting place of the General Assembly in New York City, on the northeast coast of the country. The United States is the largest provider of financial contributions to the United Nations, providing 27.89 percent of the UN assessed peacekeeping budget of $6.38 billion for fiscal year 2020 (China and Japan contributed 15.2 percent and 8.5 percent, respectively). The assessed peacekeeping budget is separate from voluntary contributions and the assessed regular budget. The assessed regular budget of the UN for fiscal year 2022 in $3.12 billion. From July 2016 to June 2017, 28.6 percent of the budget used for peacekeeping operations was provided by the United States. The United States had a pivotal role in establishing the UN.

== Role in establishing the UN ==
The UN is an outgrowth of the Atlantic Charter. It appeared in the Declaration by United Nations on January 1, 1942, in which 26 nations pledged to continue fighting the Axis powers.

Their main inspiration was the League of Nations; however, their goals were to rectify the League's imperfections in order to create an organization that would be "the primary vehicle for maintaining peace and stability." Roosevelt's main role was to convince the different allies, especially Winston Churchill of the United Kingdom and Joseph Stalin of the Soviet Union, to join the new organization. The negotiations mainly took place during the Dumbarton Oaks Conference and the Yalta Conference, where the three world leaders tried to reach a consensus concerning the United Nations' structure, purposes and principles. "Roosevelt saw the United Nations as the crowning achievement of his political career." Roosevelt's envoy Wendell Willkie played a key role in promoting the idea of the United States joining the new organization, publishing One World in April 1943. In September 1943, 81 percent of Americans—up from 63 percent in February—supported joining a "union of nations" after the war.

In 1945, representatives from 50 countries met in San Francisco for the United Nations Conference on International Organization. They deliberated on proposals that had been drafted by representatives of the Republic of China, the Soviet Union, the United Kingdom and the United States at the Dumbarton Oaks Conference between August and October 1944. Roosevelt, Churchill and Stalin reviewed the Dumbarton Oaks proposal during the Yalta Conference in February 1945. The purpose of the conference was to discuss post-war settlements and to reach a final agreement concerning "the UN's structure and membership and set the date of the San Francisco organizing conference." The world leaders eventually agreed on Roosevelt's proposal to give certain members a veto power so "that the Organization could take no important action without their joint consent." Though the veto power question created a lot of disagreement among the different signatories, its inclusion in the charter was never a matter of negotiation for Roosevelt and his allies. Finally, during the Yalta conference, Stalin agreed to make the USSR a member of the United Nations.

An important American contribution, prior to the formation of the United Nations, was made at the Bretton Woods Conference. This conference took place in 1944 and its goal was "to create a new international monetary and trade regime that was stable and predictable." Over subsequent decades, this new system opened world markets and promoted a liberal economy. It was implemented through different institutions, such as the World Bank and the International Monetary Fund, which went on to work with the United Nations but remained independent from it.

On July 28, 1945, the United States Senate (as part of the 79th United States Congress) ratified the United Nations Charter by a vote of 89–2. (By comparison, the Senate had voted 49–35 in favor of joining the League of Nations, short of the required two-thirds majority for ratification.) The United Nations officially came into existence on October 24, 1945, when all of the Permanent Five (the Republic of China, France, the Soviet Union, the United Kingdom, and the United States) as well as a majority of other signatories had ratified the Charter.

The United Nations was the first international governmental organization to receive significant support from the United States. Its forerunner, the League of Nations, had been championed by Woodrow Wilson after World War I to prevent future conflicts. While it was supported by most nations of Europe, it was never ratified by the United States Congress due to the inability to reach a compromise regarding the Lodge Reservations or the Hitchcock Reservations.

Shortly after the establishment of the United Nations, the United States came into conflict with another member of the Security Council. Since the Soviet Union was a permanent member of the United Nations Security Council, it had the power to veto any binding UN resolution. In fact, Soviet foreign minister and UN ambassador Vyacheslav Molotov used veto power twice as often as any other permanent member, earning him the title "Mr. Veto".

Relations between the United States and the Soviet Union (later Russia) within the UN have evolved in step with the larger geopolitical situation between the two powers. While the Soviet Union was boycotting the Security Council and China's seat was represented by U.S.-friendly Republic of China (instead of the communist People's Republic of China which would replace the ROC in the UN in 1971), the U.S. and UN jointly condemned the invasion of South Korea by North Korean troops, leading to the UN sanctioned Korean War. Later, the U.S. persuaded all permanent members of the Security Council to authorize force against Ba'athist Iraq in the Gulf War of 1991. This was a major step toward U.S. and Russian reconciliation in the post–Cold War era.

== Sources of conflict ==
Since 1991, the United States has been the world's dominant military, economic, social, and political power (not to mention hosting the UN Headquarters itself in New York City); the United Nations was not designed for such a unipolar world with a single superpower, and conflicts between an ascendant U.S. and other UN members have increased.

=== China question ===
Conflict between the U.S. and the UN predates the collapse of the Soviet Union. In 1971, the UN adopted Resolution 2758—which affected the admission of the People's Republic of China and the removal of the Republic of China—despite objections by the U.S. government (see China and the United Nations). The U.S. government changed its own China policy shortly afterward, however, so the conflict between the UN and US foreign policy was short-lived.

=== Israeli–Palestinian conflict ===
The U.S. government's repeated opposition to Arab military actions has created much more tension between the U.S. government and the United Nations. The General Assembly Resolution 3379 (determining that Zionism is a form of racism and racial discrimination) of 1975 was strongly opposed by U.S. officials. In 1991, the General Assembly adopted Resolution 4686, which effectively negated Resolution 3379. Use of its veto power to prevent the Security Council from issuing resolutions condemning Israel Defense Forces action has frequently divided the U.S. from the Soviet Union, China and France in the Security Council; since 1989, the U.S. government has dissented against Security Council resolutions on 12 occasions out of 17 total instances when a permanent member vetoed. Of these 12 occasions, only two related to issues other than the Israeli–Palestinian conflict. In 2009, the U.S. government abstained from Security Council Resolution 1860, which called for a halt to Israel's military response to Hamas rocket attacks, and the opening of the border crossings into the Gaza Strip.

=== Dues ===
Under the Reagan administration, the U.S. withdrew from UNESCO, and withheld its dues to encourage the UN to repeal Resolution 3379, which it did in 1991. The U.S. was—and continues to be—the member state levied most heavily by the UN, so U.S. policymakers expected this strategy to be an effective way to oppose Soviet and Arab influence over the UN. When the UN repealed Resolution 3379, the U.S. resumed dues payments, but not before the U.S. had accumulated significant and controversial arrears.

=== Vetoing second term of the Secretary-General ===
In 1996 Boutros Boutros-Ghali ran unopposed for the customary second term as UN Secretary-General. US ambassador Madeleine Albright denounced him as "disengaged" and "neglect[ful]" of genocide in Rwanda and demanded Boutros-Ghali resign. He refused and seemingly had the votes. He won 14 of the 15 votes in the Security Council, but the sole opposing vote was a US veto. After four deadlocked meetings of the Security Council, France offered a compromise in which Boutros-Ghali would be appointed to a short term of two years, but the United States rejected the French offer. Finally, Boutros-Ghali suspended his candidacy, becoming the second Secretary-General ever to be denied re-election by a veto, with Kurt Waldheim being the first.

== Public opinion ==
Polls have repeatedly gauged public opinion in the U.S. regarding the UN. In the 1950s and 1960s more supportive attitudes were found among the college-educated, more prosperous, and the politically orthodox. Distrust was more common among other groups. According to Gregory G. Holyk, "Approval of UN performance dropped to an all-time low between 2003 and 2007, after the contentious debate over the use of force against Iraq. Nonetheless, support for the UN has remained strong because the U.S. public differentiates between criticism of UN performance and support for the general purpose and aims of the UN."

According to the polling organization Rasmussen Reports, in the year 2004 a minority of 44% of United States citizens had a favorable view of the United Nations. This number continued to decline steadily, and two years later in 2006 that number had fallen to 31%. As of 2006, 26% of Americans say "the U.S. should not be involved" with the United Nations, with a moderate majority of 57% supporting remaining a member. The 2006 poll surveyed 1,000 adults. A 2008 poll by the Chicago Council on Global Affairs shows that 39% find it "very important" and 21% "not important" to strengthen the U.N.

== Arrears ==
The UN has always had problems with members refusing to pay the assessment levied upon them under the United Nations Charter, but the most significant refusal in recent times has been that of the United States.

After prolonged negotiations, the U.S. and the UN in 1999 negotiated an agreement whereby the United States would pay a large part of the money it owes, and in exchange the UN would reduce the assessment rate ceiling from 25% to 22%. The reduction in the assessment rate ceiling was among the reforms contained in the United Nations Reform Act of 1999 or Helms-Biden Act, which links payment of $926 million in U.S. arrears to the UN and other international organizations to a series of reform benchmarks.

Of the U.S. arrears to the UN totaling over $1.3 billion, $612 million was payable under Helms-Biden. The remaining $700 million resulted from various legislative and policy withholdings.

Under Helms-Biden, the U.S. paid $100 million in arrears to the UN in December 1999; release of the next $582 million awaited a legislative revision to Helms-Biden, necessary because the benchmark requiring a 25 percent peacekeeping assessment rate ceiling was not quite achieved. The U.S. also sought elimination of the legislated 25 percent cap on U.S. peacekeeping payments in effect since 1995, which continued to generate additional UN arrears. Of the final $244 million under Helms-Biden, $30 million was payable to the UN and $214 million to other international organizations.

In February 2001, Congress authorized the second Helms-Biden payment, but because of an eight-month delay in appropriations, the U.N. chose not to re-elect the United States to the United Nations Commission on Human Rights. Following the September 11 attacks, on 6 October 2001, Bush signed the second Helms-Biden appropriation into law and in March 2002, the U.S. was voted back onto the commission. In October 2002, Congress lifted the 25% cap on peacekeeping assessments and in November 2002, the U.S. made the final Helms-Biden appropriation.

U.S. debt to the United Nations, from 1995 to 2005
Year	Regular budget	Peacekeeping	Total
31 December 1995	$414 million (73%)	$816 million (47%)	$1.231 billion (56%)
31 December 1996	$376 million (74%)	$926 million (57%)	$1.303 billion (61%)
31 December 1997	$373 million (79%)	$940 million (60%)	$1.313 billion (64%)
31 December 1998	$316 million (76%)	$976 million (61%)	$1.294 billion (64%)
31 December 1999	$167 million (68%)	$995 million (67%)	$1.170 billion (67%)
31 December 2000	$165 million (74%)	$1.144 billion (56%)	$1.321 billion (58%)
31 December 2001	$165 million (69%)	$691 million (38%)	$871 million (41%)
31 December 2002	$190 million (62%)	$536 million (40%)	$738 million (44%)
31 December 2003	$268 million (61%)	$482 million (45%)	$762 million (48%)
31 December 2004	$241 million (68%)	$722 million (28%)	$975 million (33%)
30 September 2005	$607 million (82%)	$607 million (28%)	$1.246 billion (41%)

== Iraq War ==
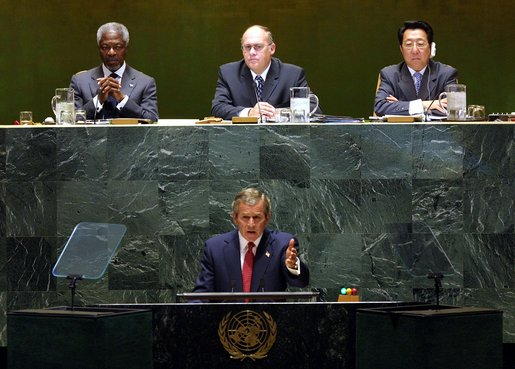
George W. Bush addressed the General Assembly on September 12, 2002 on Iraq prior to the passage of Resolution 1441.

Further conflict between the U.S. and some UN members arose in 2002 and 2003 over the issue of Iraq. George W. Bush maintained that Iraqi President Saddam Hussein had not fulfilled the obligations he had entered into at the end of the Gulf War in 1991, namely to rid Iraq of all weapons of mass destruction (WMDs) and to renounce their further use. A series of inspections by the IAEA failed to find conclusive evidence that proved allegations that Iraq was continuing to develop or harbour such weapons. The findings were conveyed by the leading weapons inspector, Hans Blix, who noted Iraq's failure to cooperate with the inspections on several counts. The U.S. replied by saying that the responsibility of proof of disarmament was upon Iraq, not on the UN or the U.S.

In November 2002, the United Nations Security Council adopted Resolution 1441, giving Iraq an ultimatum to co-operate in disarmament within an unstated timeframe of a few months. However, in March 2003, the U.S., supported by fifty countries (including the United Kingdom, Spain, Australia, the Czech Republic, Denmark, the Netherlands and Poland) which the Bush administration referred to as the "coalition of the willing" launched military operations against Iraq. On April 9, Saddam Hussein's regime was overthrown and Iraq was placed under occupation, marked by the fall of Baghdad. The U.S. argued that this action was authorized by Resolution 1441, since Iraq had failed to comply by co-operating fully in the identification and destruction of its weapons programs, and since Resolution 1441 promised 'serious consequences' for lack of full compliance and achievement of its objective.

Other countries, led by France, Germany and Russia, maintained that Resolution 1441 did not authorize the use of force without passage of a further Resolution. French President Jacques Chirac stated "My position is that, whatever the circumstances, France will vote 'no' because this evening it considers that it is not necessary to make war to achieve the stated goal of the disarmament of Iraq".

Rightly or wrongly the "this evening" qualification was ignored, perhaps because the implications of its English translation are ambiguous. The statement was widely interpreted in the English-speaking world as meaning that France would exercise its right as a Permanent Member of the Security Council to veto any resolution at any time ("whatever the circumstances") to use force against Iraq.

Following the overthrow of the former Iraqi government, the Iraq Survey Group led an exhaustive search of Iraq for WMD. Ultimately, while over 500 "degraded" chemical warheads were found, no deployable WMD of any kind were found and all WMD production facilities had been found to be inactive since 1991.

== Reform of the United Nations ==
The United States Congress has shown particular concern with reforms related to UN effectiveness and efficiency. In November 2004, the bill H.R. 4818 mandated the creation of a bipartisan Task Force to report to Congress on how to make the UN more effective in realizing the goals of its Charter. The Task Force came into being in January 2005, co-chaired by former House Speaker Newt Gingrich and former Senate Majority Leader, George J. Mitchell. In June 2005, the task force released "American Interests and UN Reform: Report of the Task Force on the United Nations," with numerous recommendations on how to improve the UN.

On June 17, 2005, the United States House of Representatives passed the United Nations Reform Act of 2005 to slash funds to the UN in half by 2008 if it does not meet certain criteria. This reflects years of complaints about anti-American and anti-Israeli bias in the UN, particularly the exclusion of Israel from many decision-making organizations. The U.S. is estimated to contribute about 27.89% of the UN's yearly budget due to the UN's ability-to-pay scale, making this bill potentially devastating to the United Nations. The Bush administration and several former U.S. ambassadors to the UN have warned that this may only strengthen anti-American sentiment around the world and serve to hurt current UN reform movements. The bill passed the House in June 2005, and a parallel bill was introduced in the Senate by Gordon H. Smith on July 13, 2005. However, a number of leading Senate Republicans objected to the requirement that the U.S. contributions be halved if the UN failed to meet all of the criteria. The UN Management, Personnel, and Policy Reform Act of 2005 (S. 1394), introduced on July 12, 2005 into the Senate by Sen. Norm Coleman [R-MN] and Sen. Richard Lugar [R-IN], called for similar reforms but left the withholding of dues to the discretion of the President. Neither piece of legislation made it into law.

Due to the significance of the organization, proposals to relocate its headquarters have occasionally been made. Complainants about its current location include diplomats who find it difficult to obtain visas from the United States and local residents complaining of inconveniences whenever the surrounding roads are closed due to visiting dignitaries, as well as the high costs to the city. A US telephone survey in 2001 found that 67% of respondents favored moving the United Nations headquarters out of the country. Countries critical of the US, such as Iran and Russia, are especially vocal in questioning the current location of the United Nations, arguing that the United States government could manipulate the work of the General Assembly through selective access to politicians from other countries, with the aim of having an advantage over rival countries. In the wake of the Snowden global surveillance disclosures, the subject of the relocation of the UN headquarters was again discussed, this time for security reasons.

Among the cities that have been proposed to house the headquarters of the United Nations are Saint Petersburg, Montreal, Dubai, Jerusalem, and Nairobi. Another past notable proposal that was known as the "World Peace Capital" included uninhabited Navy Island, situated in the Niagara River along the Canada–United States border.

Some critics of relocation say that the idea might be expensive or could also involve the withdrawal of the United States from the organization, and with it much of the agency's funding. In past they also state that the proposals have never gone from being mere declarations.

== Visa refusal controversies ==
=== Abkhazia ===
In April 2007, the U.S. government refused to give an entry visa to the foreign minister of the de facto independent Republic of Abkhazia (de jure part of Georgia) Sergei Shamba who was due to speak at the UN headquarters in New York City. The incident caused an international dispute as Russian Permanent Representative Vitaly Churkin accused the U.S. of not letting one side of the conflict speak before UN. Security Council president, British Ambassador Emyr Jones Parry, backed the Russian demand for Shamba's visa. But the U.S. Ambassador, Alejandro Daniel Wolff, accused the Russian side of "a mischievous effort" to raise "false analogies" between Abkhazia and Kosovo, thus "complicating the discussion." The U.S. stated that such airport to UNHQ visa access was not guaranteed to countries seeking international recognition; Kosovo president Fatmir Sejdiu had been given a visa. Sergei Shamba himself described the situation as "dual standards".

=== Palestine ===
In August 2025, the second Trump administration barred Palestinian officials from attending the UN General Assembly in New York the following month. The visa ban applied to as many as 90 Palestinian officials from the Palestinian Authority and the Palestine Liberation Organization, including Palestinian president Mahmoud Abbas. U.S. Secretary of State Marco Rubio cited the need to hold the two bodies "accountable for not complying with their commitments, and for undermining the prospects for peace" and demanded that they "consistently repudiate terrorism" such as the October 7 attacks, "end incitement to terrorism in education," end legal warfare against Israel through the International Criminal Court and International Court of Justice, and stop pushing countries to recognize a "conjectural Palestinian state." Despite this, the UN voted 145 in favor to allow Mahmoud Abbas to attend the annual gathering by video, with five votes against including the United States and Israel.

== Future ==
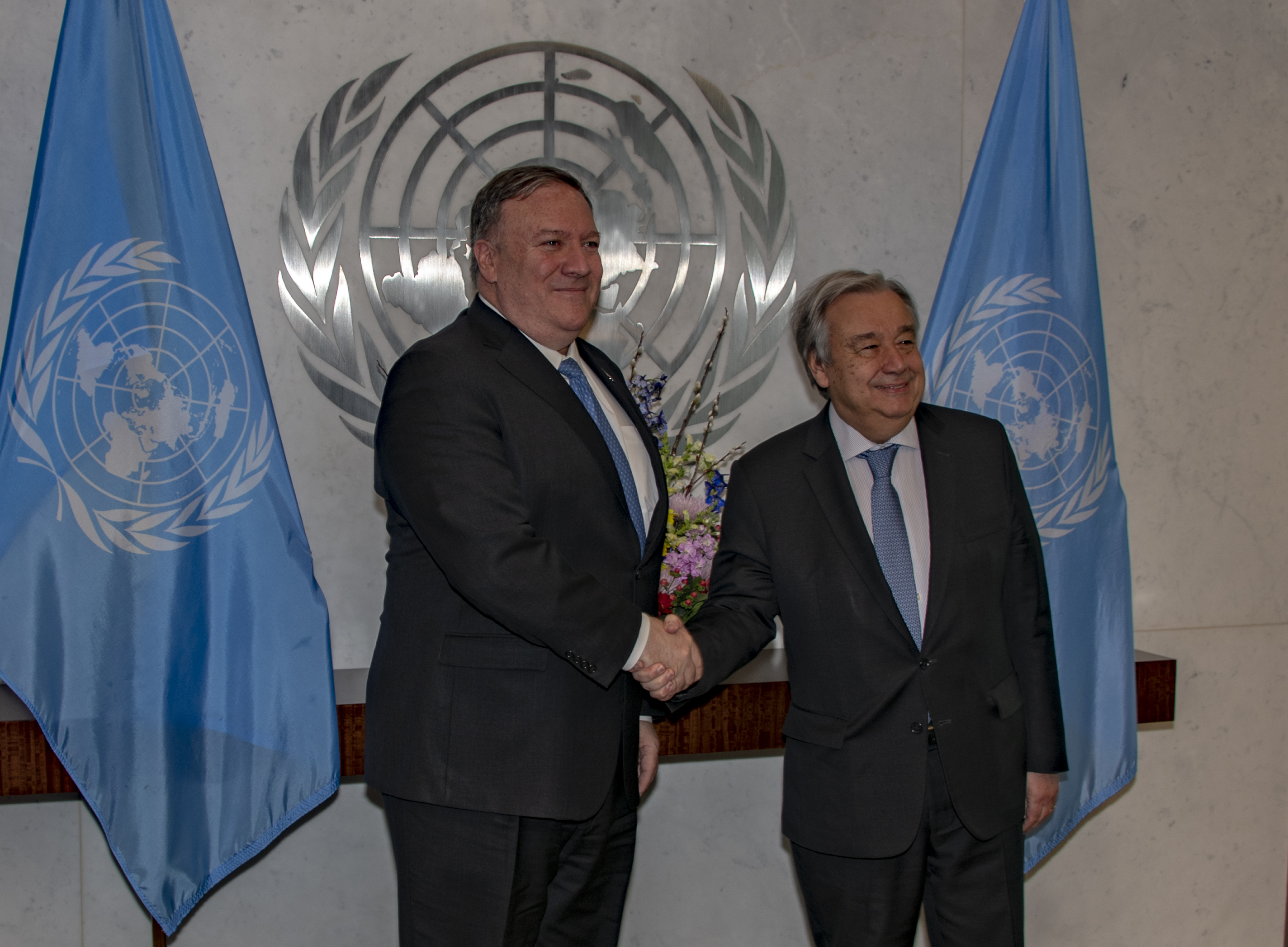
US Secretary of State Mike Pompeo (left) with UN Secretary-General António Guterres (right) in 2019

In the US, complaints about the UN surface regularly in the domestic mainstream media. Some critics who oppose international constraints on US foreign policy contend that the US should withdraw from the UN, claiming that the United States is better equipped to manage the global order unilaterally. More frequently, critics argue that the UN should be reformed to bring it more in line with US policy and leadership.

Despite criticisms, the majority of Americans (88%) support active engagement in the United Nations, as evidenced by a non-partisan poll conducted after the 2016 election. While most agree that the UN could be improved, Noam Chomsky, a leading critic of U.S. foreign policy, proposes that measures such as the US relinquishing its veto power in the Security Council and submitting to the rulings of the International Court of Justice could significantly improve the UN's ability to foster the growth of democracy and promote global peace and the protection of human rights. However, some American organizations and individuals, such as the John Birch Society and Wayne LaPierre of the National Rifle Association of America, oppose the United Nations on the basis of its perceived failures or alleged interference with domestic affairs. LaPierre wrote the book "The Global War on Your Guns," in which he alerts the U.S. to the supposed threat of the Arms Trade Treaty.

When the United States Government released its National Security Strategy for 2010 in May 2010, this quote was found embedded on the 46th page in regards to the United Nations:

Enhance Cooperation with and Strengthen the United Nations: We are enhancing our coordination with the U.N. and its agencies. We need a U.N. capable of fulfilling its founding purpose—maintaining international peace and security, promoting global cooperation, and advancing human rights. To this end, we are paying our bills. We are intensifying efforts with partners on and outside the U.N. Security Council to ensure timely, robust, and credible Council action to address threats to peace and security. We favor Security Council reform that enhances the U.N.'s overall performance, credibility, and legitimacy. Across the broader U.N. system we support reforms that promote effective and efficient leadership and management of the U.N.'s international civil service, and we are working with U.N. personnel and member states to strengthen the U.N.'s leadership and operational capacity in peacekeeping, humanitarian relief, post-disaster recovery, development assistance, and the promotion of human's rights. And we are supporting new U.N. frameworks and capacities for combating transnational threats like proliferation of weapons of mass destruction, infectious disease, drug-trafficking, and counter terrorism.

On January 3, 2017, a bill entitled the American Sovereignty Restoration Act of 2017 (ASRA) was introduced in the House to withdraw the US from the U.N. This bill was nearly identical to the first such bill, the ASRA of 1997, introduced by Ron Paul. Since then, a version of the ASRA has been introduced in every congressional session. To date, each such attempt has been met with minimal congressional support and died in committee.

== See also ==
- United States and the United Nations Convention on the Law of the Sea – American involvement in drafting but non-ratification
- United States Ambassador to the United Nations
- United States Mission to the United Nations
- International organization membership of the United States
- United Nations Association of the United States of America
- United Nations Foundation
- The U.S. Committee for the United Nations Development Program
- Foreign policy of the United States
- History of the United Nations
- List of vetoed United Nations Security Council resolutions by all members, including USA
- United States Interaction with the League of Nations; the US never joined
