= United States Senate Appropriations Subcommittee on State, Foreign Operations, and Related Programs =

Subcommittee of the United States Senate

The United States Senate Appropriations Subcommittee on State, Foreign Operations, and Related Programs is one of twelve subcommittees of the United States Senate Committee on Appropriations. The United States Senate Committee on Appropriations has joint jurisdiction with the United States House Committee on Appropriations over all appropriations bills in the United States Congress. Each committee has 12 matching subcommittees, each of which is tasked with working on one of the twelve annual regular appropriations bills.

== Appropriations process ==
Traditionally, after a federal budget for the upcoming fiscal year has been passed, the appropriations subcommittees receive information about what the budget sets as their spending ceilings. This is called "302(b) allocations" after section 302(b) of the Congressional Budget Act of 1974. That amount is separated into smaller amounts for each of the twelve Subcommittees. The federal budget does not become law and is not signed by the President. Instead, it is guide for the House and the Senate in making appropriations and tax decisions. However, no budget is required and each chamber has procedures in place for what to do without one. The House and Senate now consider appropriations bills simultaneously, although originally the House went first. The House Committee on Appropriations usually reports the appropriations bills in May and June and the Senate in June. Any differences between appropriations bills passed by the House and the Senate are resolved in the fall.

== Appropriations bills ==
An appropriations bill is a bill that appropriates (gives to, sets aside for) money to specific federal government departments, agencies, and programs. The money provides funding for operations, personnel, equipment, and activities. Regular appropriations bills are passed annually, with the funding they provide covering one fiscal year. The fiscal year is the accounting period of the federal government, which runs from October 1 to September 30 of the following year.

There are three types of appropriations bills: regular appropriations bills, continuing resolutions, and supplemental appropriations bills. Regular appropriations bills are the twelve standard bills that cover the funding for the federal government for one fiscal year and that are supposed to be enacted into law by October 1. If Congress has not enacted the regular appropriations bills by the time, it can pass a continuing resolution, which continues the pre-existing appropriations at the same levels as the previous fiscal year (or with minor modifications) for a set amount of time. The third type of appropriations bills are supplemental appropriations bills, which add additional funding above and beyond what was originally appropriated at the beginning of the fiscal year. Supplemental appropriations bills can be used for things like disaster relief.

Appropriations bills are one part of a larger United States budget and spending process. They are preceded in that process by the president's budget proposal, congressional budget resolutions, and the 302(b) allocation. Article One of the United States Constitution, section 9, clause 7, states that "No money shall be drawn from the Treasury, but in Consequence of Appropriations made by Law..." This is what gives Congress the power to make these appropriations. The President, however, still has the power to veto appropriations bills.

== Jurisdiction ==
This subcommittee oversees the U.S. State Department and several international programs and agencies, including international programs within the Department of Defense. It also manages the Peace Corps, the Export-Import Bank, the Millennium Challenge Corporation, the Commission on Security and Cooperation in Europe, and United States contributions to the International Monetary Fund and United Nations activities.

== Members, 119th Congress ==
Majority	Minority
Lindsey Graham, South Carolina, Chair (until July 11, 2026); Susan Collins, Maine, Interim Chair (from July 22, 2026); Mitch McConnell, Kentucky; John Boozman, Arkansas; Jerry Moran, Kansas; Bill Hagerty, Tennessee; Katie Britt, Alabama; Markwayne Mullin, Oklahoma (until March 23, 2026); Jon Husted, Ohio (from March 27, 2026)	Brian Schatz, Hawaii, Ranking Member; Dick Durbin, Illinois; Jeanne Shaheen, New Hampshire; Chris Coons, Delaware; Jeff Merkley, Oregon; Chris Murphy, Connecticut
Ex officio
Susan Collins, Maine	Patty Murray, Washington

== Historical subcommittee rosters ==
=== 116th Congress ===
Majority	Minority
Lindsey Graham, South Carolina, Chairman; Mitch McConnell, Kentucky; Roy Blunt, Missouri; John Boozman, Arkansas; Jerry Moran, Kansas; Marco Rubio, Florida; James Lankford, Oklahoma; Steve Daines, Montana	Patrick Leahy, Vermont, Ranking Member; Dick Durbin, Illinois; Jeanne Shaheen, New Hampshire; Chris Coons, Delaware; Jeff Merkley, Oregon; Chris Murphy, Connecticut; Chris Van Hollen, Maryland
Ex officio
Richard Shelby, Alabama	

=== 117th Congress ===
Majority	Minority
Chris Coons, Delaware, Chair; Patrick Leahy, Vermont; Dick Durbin, Illinois; Jeanne Shaheen, New Hampshire; Jeff Merkley, Oregon; Chris Murphy, Connecticut; Chris Van Hollen, Maryland	Lindsey Graham, South Carolina, Ranking Member; Mitch McConnell, Kentucky; Roy Blunt, Missouri; John Boozman, Arkansas; Jerry Moran, Kansas; Marco Rubio, Florida; Bill Hagerty, Tennessee
Ex officio
	Richard Shelby, Alabama

=== 118th Congress ===
Majority	Minority
Chris Coons, Delaware, Chair; Dick Durbin, Illinois; Jeanne Shaheen, New Hampshire; Jeff Merkley, Oregon; Chris Murphy, Connecticut; Chris Van Hollen, Maryland; Brian Schatz, Hawaii	Lindsey Graham, South Carolina, Ranking Member; Mitch McConnell, Kentucky; John Boozman, Arkansas; Jerry Moran, Kansas; Marco Rubio, Florida; Bill Hagerty, Tennessee
Ex officio
Patty Murray, Washington	Susan Collins, Maine

== See also ==
- United States House Appropriations Subcommittee on State, Foreign Operations, and Related Programs
- International affairs budget of the United States
