= Tim Shorrock =

American journalist

- Born: 1951 (age 74–75)
- Writing career
- Genre: Non-fiction

Tim Shorrock (born 1951) is an American writer and commentator on US foreign policy, US national security and intelligence, and East Asian politics.

== Life ==
The son of missionary parents, Shorrock grew up in Japan shortly after the US occupation following the Second World War. He has written articles for several magazines, including Harper's, Mother Jones, The Nation, and Salon. He also worked as a reporter in the Washington bureau of The Journal of Commerce. In a visit to Korea after the April Revolution, Tim witnessed South Korea's autocrat Syngman Rhee overthrown. He later said, "That was the first time in my life that I ever saw people rise up and throw out a dictator. I always remember the April uprising. That was a big influence on my life."

== Publications ==
=== Books ===
- The Political Economy of the Pacific Rim: An Analysis of the Relationship Between the Pacific Northwest and East Asia. Berkeley, Calif: Pacific Rim Economic Project (1980). OCLC 44658055.
- Spies for Hire: The Secret World of Intelligence Outsourcing. New York: Simon & Schuster (2008). ISBN 978-0743282253. OCLC 449219513.

=== Articles ===
- "Debacle in Kwangju." The Nation, vol. 263, no. 19 (1996).
- "Crony Capitalism Goes Global: Bush Sr. and Others Open Doors for the Carlyle Group." The Nation, vol. 274, no. 11. (Mar. 14, 2002). Research support provided by the Investigative Fund of the Nation Institute.
- "Selling (Off) Iraq: How to 'Privatize' a Country and Make Millions." The Nation, vol. 276, no. 24 (Jun. 23, 2003), pp. 11–16.
- "Watching What You Say" (cover story). The Nation, vol. 282, no. 11 (Mar. 20, 2006), pp. 11–14.
