= Office of Intelligence Support =

United States intelligence agency

The Office of Intelligence Support (OIS) is a United States government intelligence agency, part of the Department of the Treasury. It is tasked with analyzing worldwide financial activity and collecting information on the movement of technology and weapons.

== History ==
The Office of Intelligence Support was established in 1977 during the tenure of Treasury Secretary W. Michael Blumenthal. It succeeded the Office of National Security (ONS), which was set up in 1961 under Treasury Secretary Douglas Dillon to connect the Treasury Department with the work of the National Security Council. ONS's representation of Treasury with the Intelligence Community began under a presidential memorandum in 1971 during the tenure of Treasury Secretary William E. Simon.

In 1972, in response to the Murphy Commission Report to Congress, which stressed the importance of strong links between the Intelligence Community and officials responsible for international economic policy, the Treasury became a member of the National Foreign Intelligence Board. Today, Executive Order 12333 lists the Special Assistant to the Secretary (National Security) as a senior intelligence officer of the Intelligence Community.

The Office participates in preparing National Intelligence Estimates and other Community-wide intelligence products, developing and coordinating Treasury Department contributions. OIS officers also serve as Treasury members and advisors on designated national intelligence committees and subcommittees.
