= Lodge Reservations =

Hesitant documents regarding US entry into the League of Nations

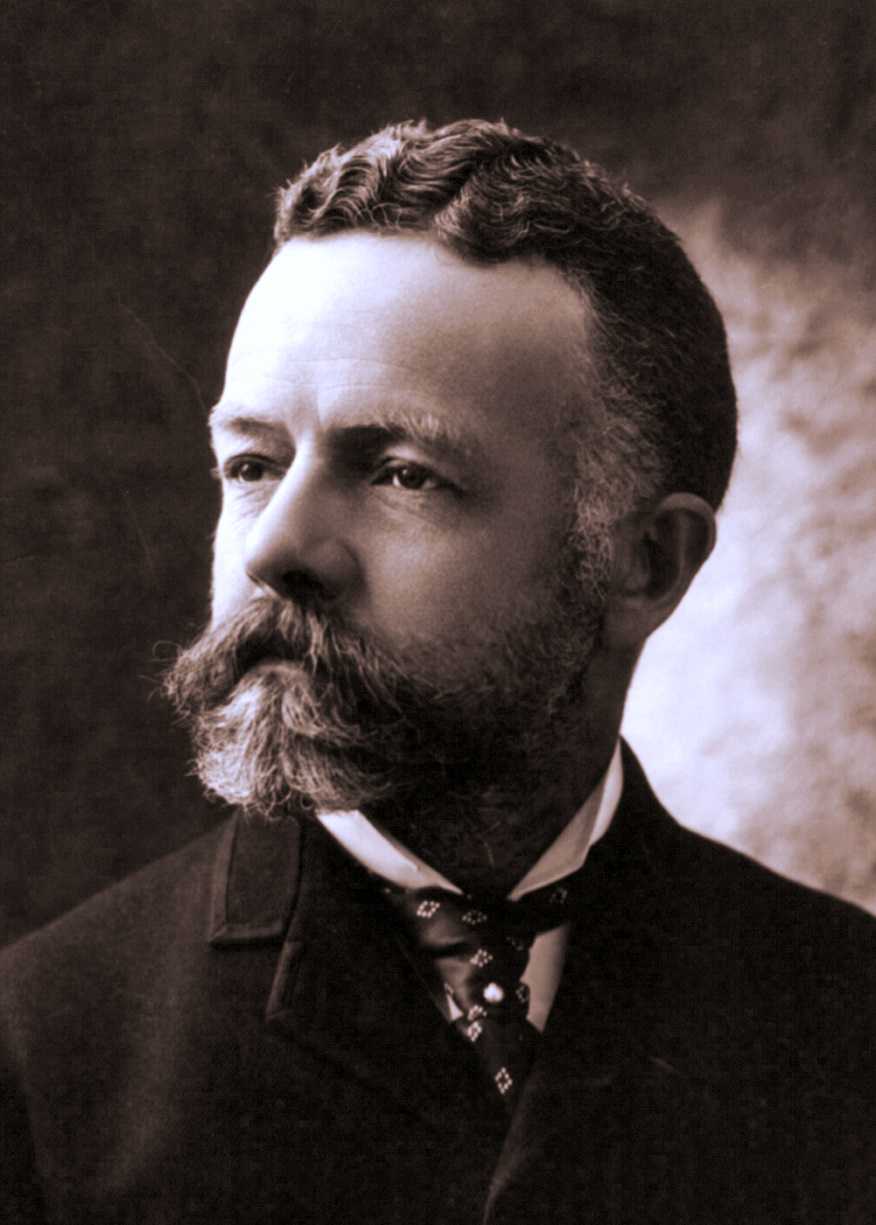
Henry Cabot Lodge

The Lodge Reservations, written by United States Senator Henry Cabot Lodge, the Republican Majority Leader and Chairman of the Committee on Foreign Relations, were fourteen reservations to the Treaty of Versailles and other proposed post-war agreements. The Treaty called for the creation of a League of Nations in which the promise of mutual security would hopefully prevent another major world war; the League charter, primarily written by President Woodrow Wilson, let the League set the terms for war and peace. If the League called for military action, all members would have to join in.

Lodge wanted to join the League of Nations with reservations. The Democrats in the Senate, following Wilson's direction, rejected Lodge's proposal to join the League with his reservations. Republicans opposed joining under Wilson's terms of no reservations, allowing the League to force the U.S. to enter a war without approval of Congress. In the end the Senate voted down the Treaty of Versailles in 1919 and never joined the new League of Nations. Lodge's reservations were eventually incorporated into the United Nations (UN) in 1945, where the U.S. had a veto.

== Reservations ==
Lodge's reservations proposed to give much power back to the United States in its interactions with other nations. A summary of each reservation follows:

=== Reservation One ===
Article 1 of the Treaty of Versailles permitted any member state voluntarily to withdraw from the League of Nations "provided that all its international obligations and all its obligations under this Covenant shall have been fulfilled." Lodge's first reservation clarified that the League could not use this clause to prevent a member state from withdrawing — at least, not when that member state was the United States.

The United States so understands and construes Article I that in case of notice of withdrawal from the League of Nations, as provided in said article, the United States shall be the sole judge as to whether all its international obligations and all its obligations under the said covenant have been fulfilled, and notice of withdrawal by the United States may be given by a concurrent resolution of the Congress of the United States.

A concurrent resolution of Congress requires the consent of both houses of Congress, but, significantly, does not require the consent of the President.

=== Reservation Two ===
Nothing compels the United States to ensure the border integrity or political independence of any nation, to interfere in foreign domestic disputes, or to involve the military, without a Congressional declaration of war.

The United States assumes no obligation to preserve the territorial integrity or political independence of any other country or to interfere in controversies between nations — whether members of the League or not — under the provisions of Article X, or to employ the military or naval forces of the United States under any article of the treaty for any purpose, unless in any particular case the Congress, which under the Constitution has the sole power to declare war or authorize the employment of the military or naval forces of the United States, shall by act or joint resolution so provide.

For many Republicans in the Senate, Article X was the most objectionable provision. Their objections were based on the fact that, by ratifying such a document, the United States would be bound by an international contract to defend a League of Nations member if it was attacked. Henry Cabot Lodge from Massachusetts and Frank B. Brandegee from Connecticut led the fight in the U.S. Senate against ratification, believing that it was best not to become involved in international conflicts.

=== Reservation Three ===
Article 22 of the Treaty of Versailles dealt with the creation and administration of League of Nations mandates. Lodge's third reservation proposed that Congress should be able to reject administering, developing, or defending any territorial mandate that the League might try to assign to it.

No mandate shall be accepted by the United States under Article XXII, Part I, or any other provision of the treaty of peace with Germany except by action of the Congress of the United States.

=== Reservation Four ===
The United States reserves to itself exclusively the right to decide what questions are within its domestic jurisdiction and declares that all domestic and political questions relating wholly or in part to its internal affairs, including immigration, labor, coastwise traffic, the tariff, commerce, the suppression of traffic in women and children and in opium and other dangerous drugs, and all other domestic questions, are solely within the jurisdiction of the United States and are not under this treaty to be submitted in any way either to arbitration or to the consideration of the Council or of the Assembly of the League of Nations, or any agency thereof, or to the decision or recommendation of any other power.

=== Reservation Five ===
The United States is not to be questioned about the Monroe Doctrine, or about its interpretation of the Monroe Doctrine.

The United States will not submit to arbitration or to inquiry by the Assembly or by the Council of the League of Nations, provided for in said treaty of peace, any questions which in the judgment of the United States depend upon or relate to its long-established policy, commonly known as the Monroe Doctrine; said doctrine is to be interpreted by the United States alone and is hereby declared to be wholly outside the jurisdiction of said League of Nations and entirely unaffected by any provision contained in the said treaty of peace with Germany.

=== Reservation Six ===
Articles 156–158 of the Treaty of Versailles transferred Germany's concessions on the Shandong Peninsula from Germany to Japan. Under Article 10 of the treaty, signatories would have been responsible for preserving Japan's new border — effectively taking Japan's side in the event of a subsequent war between Japan and China.

The United States withholds its assent to Articles 156, 157, and 158, and reserves full liberty of action with respect to any controversy which may arise under said articles between the Republic of China and the Empire of Japan.

=== Reservation Seven ===
Congress alone shall approve the United States' delegates to the League of Nations. Should no delegate ever be appointed, authorization to deal with the League is explicitly denied to any other person (significantly, even to the President).

The Congress of the United States will provide by law for the appointment of the representatives of the United States in the Assembly and the Council of the League of Nations, and may in its discretion provide for the participation of the United States in any commission, committee, tribunal court, council, or conference, or in the selection of any members thereof and for the appointment of members of said commissions, committees, tribunals, courts, councils, or conferences, or any other representatives under the treaty of peace, or in carrying out its provisions, and until such participation and appointment have been so provided for and the powers and duties of such representatives have been defined by law, no person shall represent the United States under either said League of Nations or the Treaty of Peace with Germany or be authorized to perform any act for or on behalf of the United States thereunder, and no citizen of the United States shall be selected or appointed as a member of said commissions, committees, tribunals, courts, councils, or conferences except with the approval of the Senate of the United States.

A contemporary analyst observed: "As this is a matter left to each government to determine for itself, there seems no adequate reason for incorporating such a reservation in the ratification act."

=== Reservation Eight ===
Trade between Germany and the United States can only be interfered with, with approval from Congress.

The United States understands that the reparation commission will regulate or interfere with exports from the United States to Germany, or from Germany to the United States, only when the United States, by act or joint resolution of Congress, approves such regulation or interference.

=== Reservation Nine ===
The United States is not obligated to pay any money to the League of Nations.

The United States shall not be obligated to contribute to any expenses of the League of Nations, or of the secretariat, or of any commission, or committee, or conference, or other agency organized under the League of Nations or under the Treaty or for the purpose of carrying out the Treaty provisions, unless and until an appropriation of funds available for such expenses shall have been made by the Congress of the United States.

=== Reservation Ten ===
If the United States limits its military might because of an order by the League of Nations, it can, at any time and without warning, build it up again if threatened.

If the United States shall at any time adopt any plan for the limitation of armaments proposed by the Council of the League of Nations under the provisions of Article VIII, it reserves the right to increase such armaments without the consent of the Council whenever the United States is threatened with invasion or engaged in war.

=== Reservation Eleven ===
The United States reserves the right to allow peoples of states which break the Treaty of Versailles who live in the United States to continue their lives in the United States.

The United States reserves the right to permit, in its discretion, the nationals of a covenant-breaking state, as defined in Article XVI of the Covenant of the League of Nations, residing within the United States or in countries other than that violating said Article XVI, to continue their commercial, financial, and personal relations with the nationals of the United States.

=== Reservation Twelve ===
Nothing in Articles 296, 297 or in any of the annexes thereto, or in any other article, section, or annex of the Treaty of Peace with Germany, shall, as against citizens of the United States, be taken to mean any confirmation, ratification, or approval of any act otherwise illegal or in contravention of the rights of citizens of the United States.

=== Reservation Thirteen ===
If the League of Nations is to create any future organizations, the United States is not bound to join so no matter as to how the League of Nations wishes concerning their involvement. Instead, Congress has the right to make the decision as to whether or not the United States chooses to be involved and the terms of their involvement.

The United States withholds its assent to Part XIII (Articles 387 to 427, inclusive), unless Congress by act or joint resolution shall hereafter make provision for representation in the organization established by said Part XIII, and in such event the participation of the United States will be governed and conditioned by the provisions of such act or joint resolution.

=== Reservation Fourteen ===
The United States will not be bound by any vote in the League of Nations in which a nation has voted twice, through the use of colonial possessions. Neither will it be bound by a vote which concerns a dispute between the United States and another member state, if that state has voted. This reservation was specifically intended to deal with the voting power of Dominions of the British Empire in the Assembly of the League of Nations.

The United States assumes no obligation to be bound by any election, decision, report, or finding of the Council or Assembly in which any member of the League and its self-governing dominions, colonies, or parts of empire, in the aggregate have cast more than one vote, and assumes no obligation to be bound by any decision, report, or finding of the Council or Assembly arising out of any dispute between the United States and any member of the League, if such member, or any self-governing dominion, colony, empire, or part of empire united with it politically, has voted.

== Henry Cabot Lodge and Republicanism ==
The Treaty of Versailles posed ideological problems for many Republicans, including Henry Cabot Lodge. Most contentious of its propositions was the Covenant that called for the creation of a League of 46 nations to arbitrate international law and maintain peace for the indefinite future. The contents of Article 10 specifically required that the United States Congress relinquish its authority over whether the United States commits itself to warfare. Lodge even recorded his personal position on August 11, 1919:

if there had been no proposition such as is included in Article 10, but a simple proposition that it would be our intention to aid France, which is our barrier and outpost, when attacked without provocation by Germany, I should have strongly favored it for I feel very keenly the sacrifices of France and the immense value her gallant defense was to the whole world. But they have made the French treaty subject to the authority of the League, which is not to be tolerated. If we ever are called upon to go to the assistance of France as we were two years ago, we will go without asking anybody's leave. It is humiliating to be put in such an attitude and not the least of the mischief done by the League is that Article 10 will probably make it impossible to do anything for France as Root recommends and as many of our Senators desire.

Lodge, in fact, favored many of the clauses of the Treaty and similar proposals by League supporters. It could be said that Lodge's beliefs resembled the features of the peace program of French Prime Minister Georges Clemenceau, by voicing admiration for the said program in his memorandum. The underpinnings of Lodge's acceptance of the peace program and reservations to the Treaty of Versailles highlight Wilson's opportunity to compromise with a senator who shared similar, if not identical, ideals. (memorandum, [Dec. 2, 1918,] Henry Cabot Lodge Papers (Massachusetts Historical Society); Congressional Record, 65 cong., 3 Sess., 724-28 (Dec. 21, 1918).) One of the ideals was the control of military states, especially in reaction to Germany.

During negotiations with diplomat Henry White over the impending peace settlement, Lodge emphasized that "the first and controlling purpose of the peace must be to put Germany in such a position that it will be physically impossible for her to break out again upon other nations with a war for world conquest." As was then common among political leaders, Lodge believed that Germany should pay the maximum indemnity which it could afford. Moreover, he believed that postwar matters must not be muddled by an indefinite covenant, a belief that contrasted with some previous statements that Lodge had made, such as his commencement address at Union College, Schenectady, New York, on June 9, 1915, in which he said that "in differences between nations which go beyond the limited range of arbititrable questions peace can only be maintained by putting behind it the force of united nations determined to uphold it and prevent war."

Statements like those imply possible inconsistency within Lodge's views, but many interpret Lodge, especially considering his correspondences, as a nationalist who simply disfavored aspects of the Covenant. In correspondence to Lodge, Senators Knox and Root sent a letter that explained the distinction between the League and an alliance. The three senators shared an aversion to the commitments of Article 10 as they generally accepted that it would impel the US into the enforcement of all international law. Lodge and future President Calvin Coolidge also exchanged over 400 letters from 1888 to 1924, the bulk of which centered on the 1919–1920 conflict over the League of Nations. The letters document twenty years of Lodge's expansionism and nationalism—especially in his opinions U.S. foreign policy in Latin America during the administrations of Taft and Wilson, which thus question claims that Lodge was strictly an isolationist.

== Defeat of the treaty by senatorial debate ==
On September 16, 1919, Senator Lodge called the treaty up for consideration by the full Senate. On November 6, Lodge, introduced his reservations, whilst on November 15, the chamber was still considering the treaty when for the first time in its history, the Senate successfully voted to invoke cloture, cutting off debate on the treaty. Four days later, the Senate voted on Lodge's resolution to advise and consent to ratification subject to the reservations. The vote was 39 in favor and 55 opposed. A two-thirds vote being required, the resolution failed. The senators who favored ratification of the treaty without reservations had joined with the "irreconcilables," those who opposed the treaty under any circumstances, to defeat the reservations. The Senate then considered a resolution to advise and consent to ratification of the treaty without reservations. The vote was 38 in favor and 53 opposed. A two-thirds vote being required, the resolution failed. The final blow occurred on March 19, 1920, when the treaty with reservations was again defeated, 49 in favor to 35 against.

Many historians attribute the treaty's failure to Wilson's diminished health at the time of the defeat and to his total unwillingness to compromise. On October 2, 1919, Wilson suffered a massive stroke that affected the left side of his body. He gradually recovered from this stroke, but took its toll on his health. Thomas A. Bailey wrote that "Wilson's physical and mental condition had a profoundly important bearing on the final defeat of the treaty." Several prominent thinkers believed that if Wilson had been functioning at his pre-stroke level, he would have been able to bridge the discrepancies between the two forms of Reservations on the treaty.

Wilson's doctor, Edwin A. Weinstein, felt that "had Wilson been in full health, he would have found the formula to reconcile the differences between the Lodge and Hitchcock Reservations." (Arthur Link) His illness affected him in that it incapacitated part of his left side. After the stroke, Wilson would distance himself from his paralyzed arm by referring to the arm as "it". His stroke also seemed to polarize his emotions (Arthur Link), causing him to become even more stubborn when dealing with the reservations.

Another factor in the defeat of the treaty was Wilson's staunch belief that the people supported him. He refused to compromise and so, according to Bailey, betrayed the League. Wilson's refusal led him to formulate his "Jackson Day" letter in which he calamitously made the treaty an issue of the upcoming 1920 presidential election. The letter sealed the fate of the treaty by converting a nonpartisan issue into a hostage of party loyalty and politics.
