= American Sovereignty Restoration Act =

The American Sovereignty Restoration Act is a bill that has been introduced by various members of Congress, proposing withdrawal from the United Nations. The most recent iteration is H.R.7806, the American Sovereignty Restoration Act of 2022, introduced by Rep. Mike D. Rogers.

== History ==
The 2007 bill (H.R. 1146) was authored by U.S. Representative Ron Paul, Republican of the 14th district of Texas, to effect U.S. withdrawal from the United Nations. It would repeal various laws pertaining to the UN, terminate authorization for funds to be spent on the UN, terminate UN presence on U.S. property, and withdraw diplomatic immunity for UN employees. It would provide up to two years for the U.S. to withdraw. The Yale Law Journal cited the Act as proof that "the United States’s complaints against the United Nations have intensified."

The bill was reintroduced in 2009 as H.R. 1146.

In a letter to Majority Leader Tom DeLay of April 16, 2003, and in a speech to Congress on April 29, Paul requested the repeatedly-bottlenecked issue be voted on, because "Americans deserve to know how their representatives stand on the critical issue of American sovereignty." Though he did not foresee passage in the near future, Paul believed a vote would be good for "those who don't want to get out of the United Nations but want to tone down" support; cosponsor Roscoe Bartlett's spokeswoman similarly said Bartlett "would welcome any action that would begin the debate".

In 1997, an amendment containing the bill received a floor vote, with 54 representatives voting in favor.

In December 2023, U.S. Senator Mike Lee and U.S. Representative Chip Roy introduced UN withdrawal legislation titled the “Disengaging Entirely from the United Nations Debacle (DEFUND) Act.” The legislation was closely modeled on the ASRA.

== Discussion ==
National Review cited the ASRA as an example of grassroots effort "to educate the American people about the efforts of foreign tyrants to disarm them".

On its front page, the Victoria, Texas, Advocate, a newspaper in Paul's district, expressed pride for the Act in the face of what it called several undeclared "United Nations wars".

Tim Wirth, president of the United Nations Foundation, finds the bill contrary to United States interests: "This piece of legislation has been brought by Ron Paul every year over the last 20 years and it never goes anywhere."

A policy review of U.S.-Canada relations describes the Act as reflective of "extreme views" held by a minority, but connected support for the bill among congressional Republicans as part of a broader push among Republicans for President George W. Bush "to be even tougher on immigration policy, border issues, regime change and a host of other issues connected with global governance."

== Related activity ==
The 2002 Republican Party of Texas platform explicitly urged passage of the ASRA; withdrawal from the UN had been on the platform at least since 1998.

Both houses of the Arizona legislature introduced legislation petitioning Congress to pass the ASRA (HCM 2009 in 2004, SCM 1002 in 2006); in 2007 similar legislation passed the Arizona Senate (SCM 1002 in 2007), but with the focus changed from the ASRA to Virgil Goode's Congressional resolution not to engage in a NAFTA Superhighway or a North American Union (H.Con.Res. 487, now H.Con.Res. 40).

== Advocacy ==
In 2000, Tom DeWeese's American Policy Center said it delivered to Congress more than 300,000 signatures from petitions in support of the Act.

== See also ==
- Law of the United States
- Withdrawal from the United Nations
- United States withdrawal from the United Nations
