= Oluwaseun =

Oluwaseun is a given name. Notable people with the name include:

- Oluwaseun Adegbola (born 1999), Nigerian footballer
- Oluwaseun A. Aderogba, Anglican bishop of Jebba
- Oluwaseun Osowobi, Nigerian women's rights activist
- Oluwaseun Oluwatosin Otukpe (born 1988), British musician known as S.O.
- Oluwaseun Oyegunle (born 2002), Canadian soccer player
- Deborah Oluwaseun Odeyemi (born 1995), Nigerian sprinter
