= Adegbola =

Adegbola is a surname. Notable people with the surname include:

- Anthony Afolabi Adegbola (born 1929), Nigerian professor
- Kunle Adegbola (born 1984), Nigerian cricketer
- Oluwaseun Adegbola (born 1999), Nigerian footballer
- Toyin Adegbola (born 1961), Nigerian actress
- Tunde Adegbola (born 1955), Nigerian scientist
