= Achaleke Christian Leke =

Cameroonian activist

- Achaleke Christian Leke in 2019
- Born: 12 April 1990 (age 36); Kumba, Cameroon
- Education: University of Buea; University of Yaoundé I University of Birmingham
- Organization: Local Youth Corner Cameroon
- Known for: Peace Building and International Development
- Board member of: The IIJ

Achaleke Christian Leke (born 12 April 1990) is a Cameroonian activist peacebuilding and development activist and the 2016 Commonwealth Young Person of the Year. In 2007, at the age of 17, Leke started advocating against violences and crimes within his community. Since then, his activities in various vulnerable areas have led to partnerships with United Nations, World Bank and African Commonwealth, and recognitions such as being named most influential young Cameroonian in 2016, and featuring on the UN list of 10 leaders who can inspire you to change the world in 2020.

Leke serves as executive director at Local Youth Corner Cameroon, a Cameroonian NGO. In addition, in 2022, Achaleke was appointed by the African Union Commission to serve as the African Union Youth Ambassador for Peace representing the Central African Region. From 2019, he is a board member at the International Institute for Justice and the Rule of Law (IIJ), and a member of youth advisory committee for Dallaire Institute for Children, Peace and Security since 2020.

== Biography ==
Leke was born on 12 April 1990 in Fiango Kumba, and was raised in Kumba, the Southwest region of Cameroon, in a conflict-hit city. He completed his elementary and secondary education in Cameroon. Achaleke grew up in the local NGO, Local Youth Corner Cameroon, where he started volunteering for in 2007, occupying different positions to becoming the executive director. In 2009, Achaleke enrolled at University of Buea, Cameroon where he attended the faculty of history and graduated with bachelor's degree in history with a minor in political science in 2011. Subsequently, he enrolled in University of Yaoundé 1 to pursue a post graduate diploma in International Relations, he graduated in 2013. Since 2017, Achaleke also holds master's degree in security and development from University of Birmingham, England as a Chevening Scholar.

== Career ==
Leke began his career as a volunteer with Local Youth Corner Cameroon in 2007. At the age of 17, his role as a volunteer was focused on using theatre and public engagement to sensitize his peers and communities against the social vices which were facing his community. He grew within the organization and in 2013 he was appointed as the Deputy National Coordinator of the organization. Achaleke's leadership and contribution towards youth empowerment and advocating for peace led to his appointment by the Cameroonian Government as the Cameroon Youth Ambassador to the Commonwealth where he served until 2020.

In 2015, Leke joined the Global Youth Advocacy team of the United Network of Young Peace Builders where he supported advocacy engagements for the adoption of the United Nations Security Council Resolution 2250 on Youth Peace and Security. In the same year, he was appointed to serve as the National Coordinator of Local Youth Corner Cameroon. As a result, he was invited as a speaker at the 2015 White House Summit to Counter Violent Extremism in the United States.

In 2016, he was recognized as the Commonwealth Young Person of the Year where he was received by Queen Elizabeth II. Achaleke was later appointed the pioneer Pan-Commonwealth Coordinator of the Commonwealth Youth Peace Ambassadors Network where he led over 100 youth peace-building organizations and movements across the Commonwealth. Subsequently, Achaleke was elected the global coordinator of Commonwealth Peace Ambassadors Network, he served until 2020. In addition, since 2018, he served as a part-time lecturer at University of Buea for post graduate program in Peace and Security Studies until 2020.

== Activities ==
In 2007, he started volunteering for Local Youth Corner Cameroon, a nonprofit that aims to empower young people to prevent violence and promote sustainable development, he became the executive director at the organization in 2021. He engaged in and led youth empowerment and peace-building projects across the world, in 2021, he was recognized by the Project Management Institute among the Future 50 Project leaders. Among his activities at the organization, in 2018, they supported a free school initiative named ''The Salaam School Initiative'', to support the re-education of children affected by violent conflict in the Far North Region. In 2020, during COVID-19 crisis, they implemented One Person, One Hand Sanitizer initiative where they manufactured and donated hand sanitizer for communities in Cameroon. The disinfectants were made in accordance with the World Health Organization’s recipe for hand sanitizers and bottles were distributed into vulnerable communities by youth volunteers. In the same year, Achaleke featured on the UN list of 10 young people leading the COVID-19 response in their communities.

== Recognitions ==
- 2016, 2017, 2019, 2020 & 2021: Nominated Among 100 Most Influential Africans. By Advance Publications.
- 2021: Recognised as a CNN Changemaker for the African Voices Changemaker TV show.
- 2021: Recognised as Youth Peace Builder of the Year in Cameroon by the Presbyterian Church of Cameroon Peace Office
- 2020: Nominated Among 100 Most Influential Africans. By Advance Publications.
- 2020: Best Youth COVID19 Response in Cameroon. By UN in Cameroon.
- 2020: Winner of Premio Mundo Negro de la Fratenidad (Black World Award) in Spain.
- 2022: Named by MIPAD among 100 Most Influential People of African Descent.

== See also ==
- Commonwealth Youth Programme
