= Aderogba =

Nigerian given name

- Gender: Male
- Language: Yoruba

Origin
- Origin: Nigeria
- Meaning: The crown offers support. Royalty surrounds me.
- Region of origin: South West, Nigeria

Aderogba is a Nigerian male given name and surname of Yoruba origin. It means "The crown offers support. Royalty surrounds me".

== People ==
- Oluwaseun Aderogba, Nigerian bishop
- Peace Emmanuel Aderogba Oredope (2002-), Nigerian musician
- Oluwaseun Adegbola (born 1999), Nigerian footballer
