= IIJ =

IIJ may refer to:

- International Institute for Journalism, a Berlin-based institution offering professional training to journalists from the Third World
- The International Institute for Justice and the Rule of Law, an organization to improve governance within underdeveloped countries
- Internet Initiative Japan, Japan’s first Internet service provider
