= Dallaire Institute for Children, Peace, and Security =

Canadian not-for-profit organization

- Formation: 2007
- Founder: Roméo Dallaire; Jacqueline O'Neill
- Website: https://dallaireinstitute.org/
- Formerly called: Roméo Dallaire Child Soldiers Initiative

The Dallaire Institute for Children, Peace, and Security (previously the Roméo Dallaire Child Soldiers Initiative) is an institute at Dalhousie University that works to end the recruitment and use of child soldiers. The initiative was founded by Roméo Dallaire and Jacqueline O'Neill in 2007, and is situated in Halifax, Nova Scotia with offices in Kigali, Rwanda and Juba, South Sudan.

== Activities ==
The Dallaire Institute conducts research, and partners with governments to deliver military and police training on the prevention of children from being recruited and used in conflict. They also conduct training on how to disarm child soldiers. In 2016, fifteen veterans of the Canadian Armed Forces were chosen to train workers in war zones in how to safely defuse confrontations with child soldiers.

In 2019, the Institute worked with the Canadian Armed Forces to create a Center of Excellence at the Canadian Defence Academy, called the Dallaire Centre of Excellence for Peace and Security. That same year, the Dallaire Initiative took over the international programmes of Child Soldiers International when that organization closed. And the Dallaire Initiative also opened an African Centre of Excellence in Kigali, Rwanda.

In 2021, the Dallaire Institute announced a new Latin America Centre of Excellence for Children, Peace, and Security in Uruguay.
