= Timothy Adewole =

Anglican bishop in Nigeria

S Timothy G Adewole is an Anglican bishop in Nigeria. He is Bishop of Kwara having previously been Bishop of Jebba, both in the Anglican Province of Kwara, itself one of 14 within the Church of Nigeria.
