= Commonwealth Youth Programme =

Youth international development agency based in London

The Commonwealth Youth Programme, also known as CYP, is an international development agency working with young people between the ages of 15 and 29. Part of the Commonwealth Secretariat, CYP is active in the Commonwealth's 54 member countries. CYP has a head office in London with four centers in Africa (Lusaka, Zambia), Asia (Chandigarh, India), the Caribbean (Georgetown, Guyana), and the Pacific (Honiara, Solomon Islands). Currently, there are four regional directors and 16 program officers, plus support staff, working there.

== About ==
The CYP's program of work is decided mainly by the Commonwealth Youth Ministers Meeting. Funded by Commonwealth governments through annual pledges to a voluntary fund, CYP is not a funding agency and does not provide financial support to any other organization.

CYP supports, and is supported by, a body of youth representatives called the Commonwealth Youth Caucus. The Youth Caucus meets at the national, regional, and pan-Commonwealth levels to advise the program. The Youth Caucus has a seat at the Commonwealth Youth Ministers Meeting and helps to organize the Commonwealth Youth Forum, which meets prior to the Commonwealth Heads of Government Meeting.

The program was supported by Queen Elizabeth II in her role as head of the Commonwealth. Princess Anne visited the Commonwealth Youth Programme Regional Centre for Africa in Lusaka, Zambia, in September 2012 as part of her four-day official visit to the country to mark the Queen's Diamond Jubilee.

In 2017, the Commonwealth Secretariat released a review of the Commonwealth Youth Program.

== Activities ==
CYP provides government and youth-centered organizations with technical assistance in the areas of:

- Enterprise/vocational training and microcredit
- Youth participation in decision-making and youth policy
- Professionalization and training for youth workers
- Citizenship, peacebuilding, and human rights education
- HIV/AIDS awareness and counseling
- Information and Communications Technology
- Democracy (through Commonwealth election observer missions)
- Youth mainstreaming

=== Scope ===
All of CYP's work falls within The Plan of Action for Youth Empowerment (2007-2015), which is the Commonwealth's organizing framework for cooperation on youth affairs. Through the Plan of Action, Commonwealth Heads of Government have affirmed that "empowering young people means creating and supporting the enabling conditions under which young people can act on their own behalf, and on their own terms, rather than at the direction of others."

== Youth Awards ==
The Commonwealth Youth Awards for Excellence in Development Work celebrate the contribution of young people to achieving global development goals. The awards, presented to Commonwealth citizens aged 15–29, showcase the work of outstanding young people who are leading initiatives ranging from poverty alleviation to peace building.

Each year an outstanding entrant is named Commonwealth Young Person of the Year, with regional awards given for Asia, the Pacific, the Caribbean and Americas, Africa and Europe. The awards demonstrate to leaders and other policy-makers the importance of young people’s role in development. The awards also serve to inspire other young people to take action in their communities.

Development work can be within any number of areas, such as skills training, arts and culture, environment protection, education, health and well-being, human rights, technology, sport, science, and many more areas.

Commonwealth Youth Award Winners (2012 - 2020)
| Year | Asia | Africa | Pacific | Americas | Young Person of the Year |
|---|---|---|---|---|---|
| 2012 | Anoka Primrose Abeyrathne (Sri Lanka) | Evans Wadongo (Kenya) | Julian O’Shea (Australia) | Kemar Saffrey(Barbados) | Evans Wadongo (Kenya) |
| 2013 | Priti Rajagopalan (India) | Gilbert Addah (Ghana) | Ariel Chuang (New Zealand) | Christaneisha Soleyn (Barbados) | Priti Rajagopalan (India) |
| 2014 | | | | | |
| 2015 | Gulalai Ismail (Pakistan) | Julius Shirima (Tanzania) | Brianna Fruean (Samoa) | Nolana Lynch (Trinidad and Tobago) | Julius Shirima (Tanzania) |
| 2016 | Achaleke Christian Leke (Cameroon) | Shougat Nazbin Khan (Bangladesh) | Bal Kama (Papua New Guinea) | Shamoy Hajare (Jamaica) | Achaleke Christian Leke (Cameroon) |
| 2017 | Krystle Reid (Sri Lanka) | Charles Lipenga (Malawi) | Jacqueline Joseph (Papua New Guinea) | Tricia Teekah (Guyana) | Krystle Reid (Sri Lanka) |
| 2018 | Vanessa Paranjothy (Singapore) | Sherifah Tumusiime (Uganda) | Usman Iftikhar (Australia) | Jonathan Barcant (Trinidad and Tobago) | Usman Iftikhar (Australia) |
| 2019 | Padmanaban Gopalan (India) | Oluwaseun Osowobi (Nigeria) | Bobby Siarani (Solomon Islands) | Johanan Dujon (Saint Lucia) | Oluwaseun Osowobi (Nigeria) |
| 2020 | Hafiz Usama Tanveer (Pakistan) | Galabuzi Brian Kakembo (Uganda) | Sagufta Salma (Fiji) | Sowmyan Jegatheesan (Canada) | Galabuzi Brian Kakembo (Uganda) |

The Awards Program added a new region to give more visibility to young people across the Commonwealth.

Commonwealth Youth Award Winners (2021 - Onwards)
| Year | Asia | Africa | Pacific | Caribbean | Europe & Canada | Young Person of the Year |
|---|---|---|---|---|---|---|
| 2021 | Faysal Islam (Bangladesh) | Jeremiah Thoronka (Sierra Leone) | Maselina Iuta (Samoa) | Bevon Chadel Charles (Grenada) | Siena Castellon (United Kingdom) | Faysal Islam (Bangladesh) |

For the 2022 Awards, to mark the celebration of the Platinum Jubilee of Elizabeth II, Head of the Commonwealth, The Queen's Commonwealth Trust (QCT) has joined as a partner to offer a selected applicant two years of flexible funding of £20,000 a year, as well as coaching opportunities and organizational development support.

== Partners ==
The Commonwealth Youth Programme works in partnership with a range of organizations, including

- Commonwealth of Learning
- Commonwealth Foundation
- Commonwealth Youth Exchange Council
- The Royal Commonwealth Society
- Commonwealth Policy and Studies Unit
- UN (UNICEF, UN Youth Unit, UNAIDS, UN Habitat, UNDP, UNESCO, and UNFPA)
- CARICOM
- 47 partner universities delivering youth work qualifications
- A range of microcredit NGOs and development banks
- The Body Shop of Australia
