= James Akinola =

Anglican bishop in Nigeria

James Olaoti Akinola was an Anglican bishop in Nigeria. He was the pioneer Bishop of Igbomina-West, one of eight in the Anglican Province of Kwara, itself one of 14 within the Church of Nigeria.

He was elected as Bishop of Igbomina-West on 29 October 2009 at the Episcopal synod of the Church of Nigeria Anglican Communion held at the Basilica of Grace Apo in Gudu district of the Anglican Diocese of Abuja.

He retired in 2016.
