= Festus Oyetola Sobanke =

Anglican bishop in Nigeria

Festus Oyetola Sobanke is the Anglican Bishop of Omu-Aran in Kwara Province of the Church of Nigeria.

He was consecrated Bishop of Omu-Aran in April 2019 at St David's Anglican Cathedral Church, Ijomu, Akure, by the Primate of All Nigeria, Nicholas Okoh.

Sobanke is the second Bishop of Omu-Aran, succeeding the Pioneer Bishop Philip Adeyemo elected in 2007, who has retired.
