= 1985 New York City mayoral election =

- November 5, 1985
- Registered: 2,842,517
- Turnout: 1,170,904; 41.19% (▼14.48 pp)
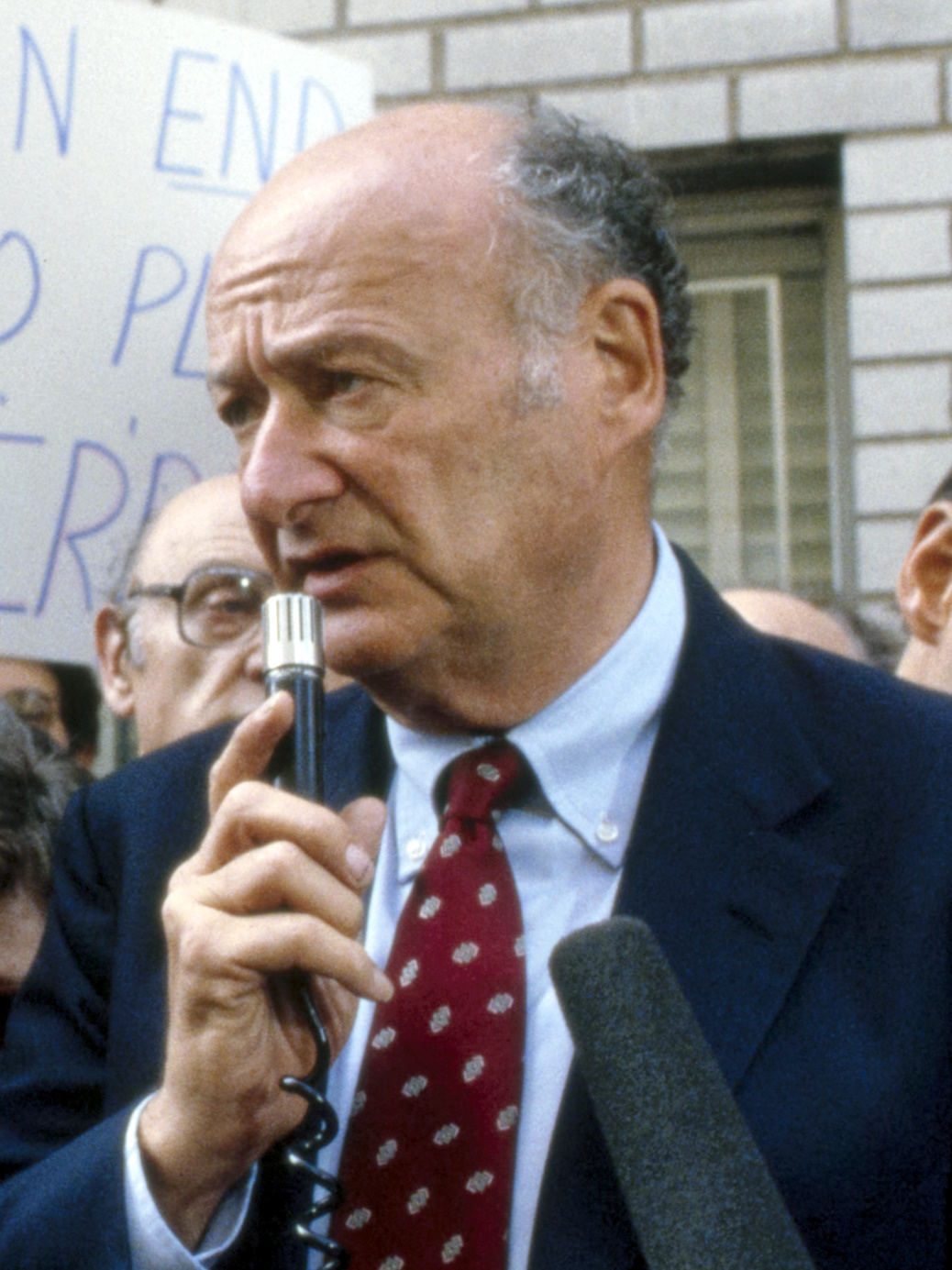

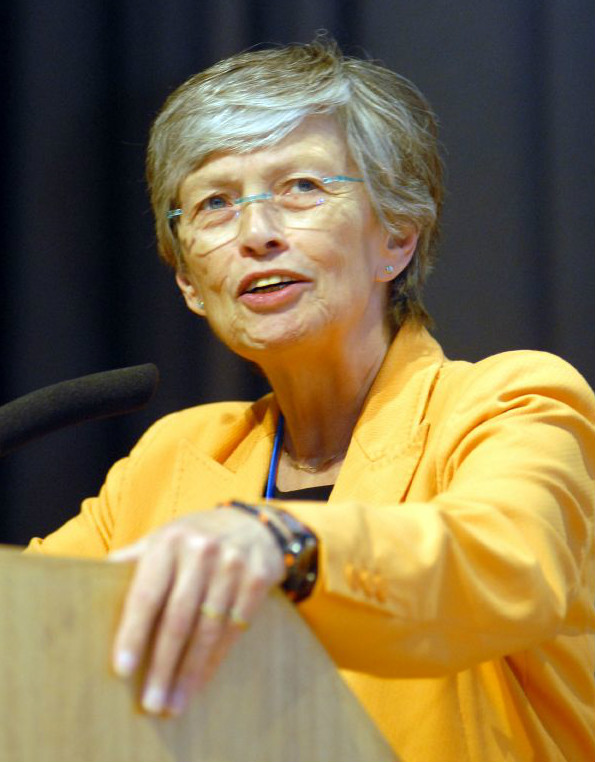

Candidate	Ed Koch	Carol Bellamy	Diane McGrath
Party	Democratic	Liberal	Republican
Alliance			Conservative
Popular vote	868,260	113,471	101,668
Percentage	78.0%	10.2%	9.1%
- Koch: 50%–60% 60%–70% 70–80% 80–90%
Mayor before election
Ed Koch
Democratic
Elected Mayor
Ed Koch
Democratic

The New York City mayoral election of 1985 occurred on Tuesday, November 5, 1985, with Democratic incumbent Mayor Ed Koch being re-elected to a third term by a landslide margin.

Koch received an overwhelming 78.02% of the vote citywide. Koch also swept all five boroughs by landslide margins, breaking 70% of the vote in Manhattan and Queens and breaking 80% of the vote in Brooklyn, the Bronx, and Staten Island. Koch's closest competitor was the Liberal Party nominee, New York City Council President Carol Bellamy, who received 10.20% of the vote. Finishing in a distant third was the Republican nominee, Diane McGrath, who received 9.14% of the vote. Koch was sworn into his third and final term in January 1986.

To date, this is the last time a Democrat won Staten Island in a mayoral election, and the last time any mayoral candidate carried all five boroughs.

== Democratic primary ==
=== Candidates ===
- Carol Bellamy, President of the New York City Council since 1978 (also running for Liberal Party)
- Gilbert DiLucia (also running for Coalition Party)
- Denny Farrell, State Assemblyman from Harlem
- Ed Koch, incumbent Mayor since 1978
- Fred Newman, psychotherapist and political activist
- Judah Rubenstein

==== Withdrew ====
- Herman Badillo, former U.S. Representative from the Bronx (1971–77)

=== Campaign ===
Al Vann and Herman Badillo tried to unite the Black and Puerto Rican communities but were thwarted by the Harlem Gang of Four. In a move that shocked Vann, the so-called “Gang of Four” from Harlem—Charles Rangel, David Dinkins, Basil Paterson and Percy Sutton—broke ranks and put forth their own candidate for mayor, Harlem Assemblyman Herman “Denny” Farrell, a dark horse if ever there was one. They argued that a black group like the Coalition for a Just New York should support a black candidate, not a Puerto Rican. Badillo bitterly withdrew from consideration. Farrell lost badly in the primary."

=== Results ===
Results by State Assembly district Koch: 30%–40%; 40%–50%; 50%–60%; 60%–70%; 70%–80%; 80%–90%; Bellamy: 40%–50%; Farrell: 30%–40%; 40%–50%

1985 Democratic mayoral primary
Party	Candidate	Votes	%
Democratic	Ed Koch (incumbent)	436,151	64.0%
Democratic	Carol Bellamy	127,690	18.7%
Democratic	Denny Farrell	89,845	13.2%
Democratic	Gilbert DiLucia	11,627	1.7%
Democratic	Fred Newman	8,584	1.2%
Democratic	Judah Rubenstein	8,057	1.2%
Total votes		681,954	100.00%

== General election ==
=== Candidates ===
- Carol Bellamy, President of the New York City Council since 1978 (Liberal)
- Lenora Fulani, psychologist and black nationalist (New Alliance)
- Andrea Gonzalez (Socialist Works)
- Yehuda Levin (Right to Life)
- Gilbert DiLucia (Coalition)
- Ed Koch, incumbent Mayor since 1978 (Democratic)
- Diane McGrath (Republican and Conservative)
- Marjorie Stamberg (Spartacist)
- Jarvis Tyner, activist and executive vice chair of the Communist Party USA (People Before Profits)

=== Results ===
1985 New York City mayoral election
Party	Candidate	Votes	%	±%
Democratic	Ed Koch (incumbent)	862,226	77.5%	
Independent	Ed Koch (incumbent)	6,034	0.54%	
Total	Ed Koch (incumbent)	868,260	78.03%	
Liberal	Carol Bellamy	113,471	10.20%	
Republican	Diane McGrath	79,508	7.14%	
Conservative	Diane McGrath	22,160	1.99%	
Total	Diane McGrath	101,668	9.14%	
Right to Life	Yehuda Levin	14,517	1.30%	
New Alliance	Lenora Fulani	7,597	0.68%	
Independent	Jarvis Tyner	3,370	0.30%	
Socialist Workers	Andrea Gonzalez	1,677	0.15%	
Independent	Gilbert DiLucia	1,135	0.10%	
Independent	Marjorie Stamberg	1,101	0.10%	
Write-in		9	0.00%	
Total votes		1,112,796	100.00%	

==== By borough ====
General Election
		Manhattan	The Bronx	Brooklyn	Queens	Staten Island	Total
Democratic - Independent	Edward I. Koch	171,582	137,472	248,585	248,041	62,580	868,260
Liberal	Carol Bellamy	41,190	14,092	29,256	25,098	3,835	113,471
Republican - Conservative	Diane McGrath	17,491	12,358	25,738	36,032	10,049	101,668
	others						29,397
							1,112,796
