= Olusegun Adeyemi =

Anglican bishop in Nigeria

Olusegun Adeyemi was an Anglican archbishop in Nigeria he is the immediate past Bishop of Kwara, one of seven in the Anglican Province of Kwara, he was one of 14 archbishops within the Church of Nigeria. Adeyemi was elected Archbishop of the Anglican Province of Kwara in 2017.

He retired in 2019.
