= Anglican Diocese of Kwara =

Anglican diocese in Nigeria

The Anglican Diocese of Kwara is one of eight within the Anglican Province of Kwara, itself one of 14 ecclesiastical provinces within the Church of Nigeria. The current bishop, appointed in 2017, is the Right Rev. Olusegun Adeyemi, who is also Archbishop of the Province.
