= Ambassador for Women, Peace and Security =

Canadian diplomatic role

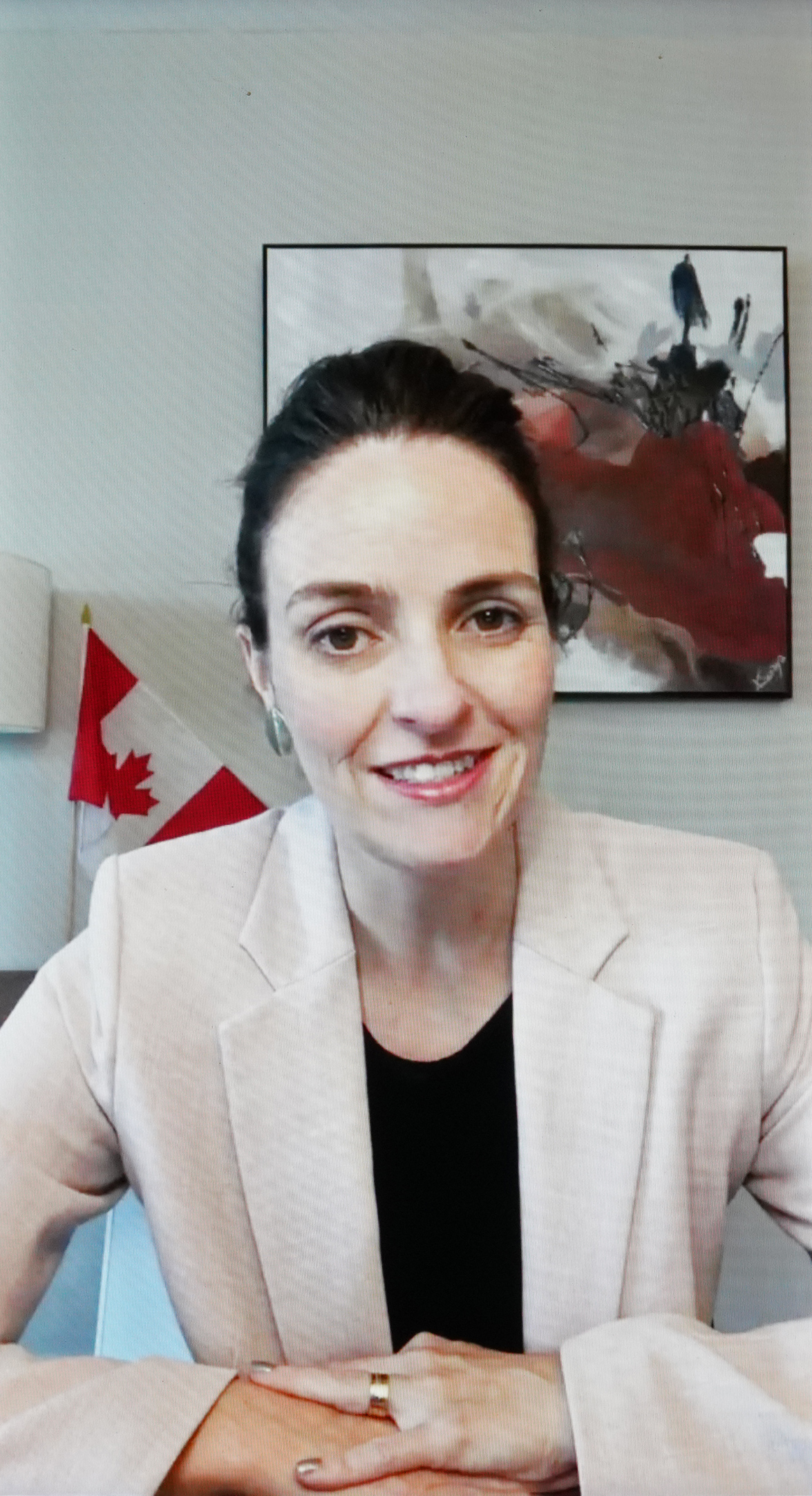
- Incumbent; Jacqueline O'Neill since June 2019
- Appointer: Prime Minister of Canada
- Term length: 3 years
- Formation: 2019
- First holder: Jacqueline O'Neill

Canada's Ambassador for Women, Peace and Security is a diplomatic role, established by the Federal Government of Canada in 2019.

== Mandate ==
The ambassador works to further the objectives of Canada's feminist foreign policy. The mandate of the role is to "provide confidential assessments and advice to ministers engaged in the implementation of Canada's National Action Plan on WPS [women, peace, and security], and about how Canada can continue to demonstrate global leadership."

== History ==
The first ambassador, Jacqueline O'Neill, was appointed by Prime Minister Justin Trudeau in June 2019.
