= Israel Amoo =

Anglican bishop in Nigeria

Israel Amoo is an Anglican bishop in Nigeria: he is Bishop of the New Bussa diocese, one of seven in the Anglican Province of Kwara, itself one of 14 within the Church of Nigeria.

He is the current Archbishop of the Anglican Province of Kwara.
