= Michael Akinyemi =

Anglican bishop in Nigeria

Michael Akinyemi (born 17 October 1947) is an Anglican bishop in Nigeria: he was the pioneer bishop of Igbomina, one of seven in the Anglican Province of Kwara, itself one of 14 within the Church of Nigeria. Akinyemi was also Archbishop of the Anglican Province of Kwara until his retirement in 2017.
