= W. E. B. Du Bois Clubs of America =

American national youth organization

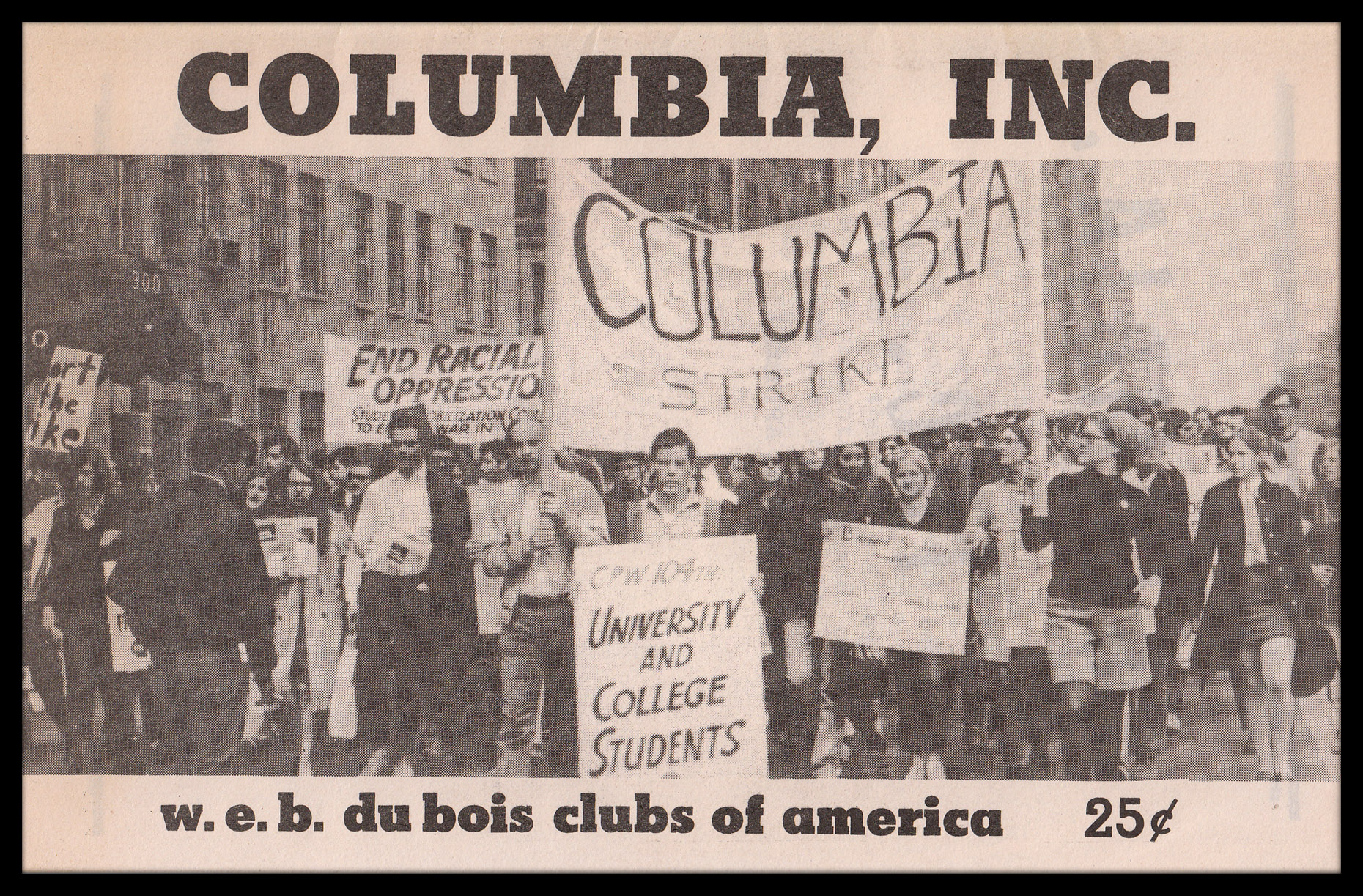
Cover of Bettina Aptheker's May 1968 pamphlet, Columbia Inc., published in New York by the W.E.B. Du Bois Clubs of America.

The W.E.B. Du Bois Clubs of America was a national youth organization sponsored by the Communist Party USA (CPUSA) and launched at a national convention held in San Francisco in June 1964. The organization was active in the American student movement of the 1960s and maintained a prominent presence on a number of college campuses including Columbia University and the University of California, Berkeley. The organization was dissolved by decision of the CPUSA in February 1970 and succeeded by a new organization known as the Young Workers Liberation League. They were named after socialist and racial and social activist W. E. B. Du Bois, co-founder of the National Association for the Advancement of Colored People.

== Organizational history ==
=== Forerunners ===
The W.E.B. Du Bois Clubs of America was a national mass organization conceived and sponsored by the Communist Party USA (CPUSA) and directed at young people. The Du Bois Clubs were not the youth section of the CPUSA, but were rather designed as a separate party-sponsored and controlled organization which would help bring unaffiliated students and young workers into the CPUSA's orbit through their participation in a broader and less orthodox organization.

The direct forerunner of the Du Bois Clubs was the Progressive Youth Organizing Committee (PYOC), established in April 1959, and Advance, the New York City-based youth organization from which the PYOC had sprung. Under the sponsorship of the PYOC, in 1961, a small group of radicals in San Francisco established themselves as the "W.E.B. Du Bois Club." This small group proved the inspiration for sister Du Bois Clubs across the bay in Berkeley and at San Francisco State College. The next year, a campus chapter was organized at UCLA in Los Angeles.

In June 1963, the PYOC conducted a training school for young activists in New York City. Two separate courses were held, one for individuals which had never attended party training sessions before, and another for those who had previously participated in similar programs.

By the fall of 1963, the Communist Party had clearly decided to proceed with the formation of a new mass organization of youth, with national secretary Gus Hall announcing in October the intention of the party to create "a Marxist-oriented youth organization to attract non-Communists as the first step toward their eventual recruitment into the party." While the precise form of this new organization was still undetermined, this group would ultimately emerge as the W.E.B. Du Bois Clubs of America. In preparation for the new organization, The Convener, a newsletter edited by Carl Bloice, was launched.

=== Formation ===
Prior to the formal establishment of a national organization known as the W.E.B. Du Bois Clubs of America, a Conference of Socialist Youth was held in San Francisco over the weekend of March 21–22, 1964. This gathering was sponsored by the four California Du Bois Clubs (San Francisco, USF, Berkeley, and Los Angeles), and by a Marxist group called the Youth Action Union. This gathering included a number of workshops on such topics as Automation and the Labor Movement, Civil Rights, Peace and Disarmament, and The Ultra Right. A standing proposal for a "National Youth Organization" (abbreviated as "NYO" in conference documents) was alluded to, and the gathering seems to have formally urged that "the NYO take the form of National Du Bois Clubs."

A final determination was apparently made by the CPUSA in April or May 1964 to make the California Du Bois Clubs the model for the new national organization. A founding convention was called for June 19–21, 1964 for Chicago, but this location was quickly shifted to San Francisco, the place from whence the pioneer California groups had sprung.

The June 1964 founding convention of the W.E.B. Du Bois Clubs of America was attended by about 200 delegates, including communist activists like Bettina Aptheker, Carl Bloice, Mickey Lima, and People's World editor Al Richmond. The gathering was called to order by Marvin Treiger and quickly divided itself into work groups on Organization, Civil Rights, Puerto Rico, Black issues, Farm Worker issues, Unemployment, Peace, Education and Culture, Political Action, Vietnam, and Socialist Youth Unity.

Acrimony erupted during the discussion of the group's constitution, specifically over a proposal that no person would be eligible for membership in the W.E.B. Du Bois Clubs of America who was a member of another socialist organization. This section, specifically aimed to exclude members of the Trotskyist Young Socialist Alliance and the neo-Stalinist Progressive Labor Party, inflamed members of those groups. One member of the National Committee of another organization loudly declared that the invitation to establish a broad youth organization at the San Francisco convention had been a hoax, and a series of walkouts commenced which removed about one-third of the delegates from the gathering.

The remaining delegates to the convention, about 139 in all, elected Phil Davis, a former field secretary of the Student Nonviolent Coordinating Committee as President and Eugene Dennis, Jr. as editor of the organization's publication, The Convener, which was renamed The Insurgent in early 1965.

=== Development ===
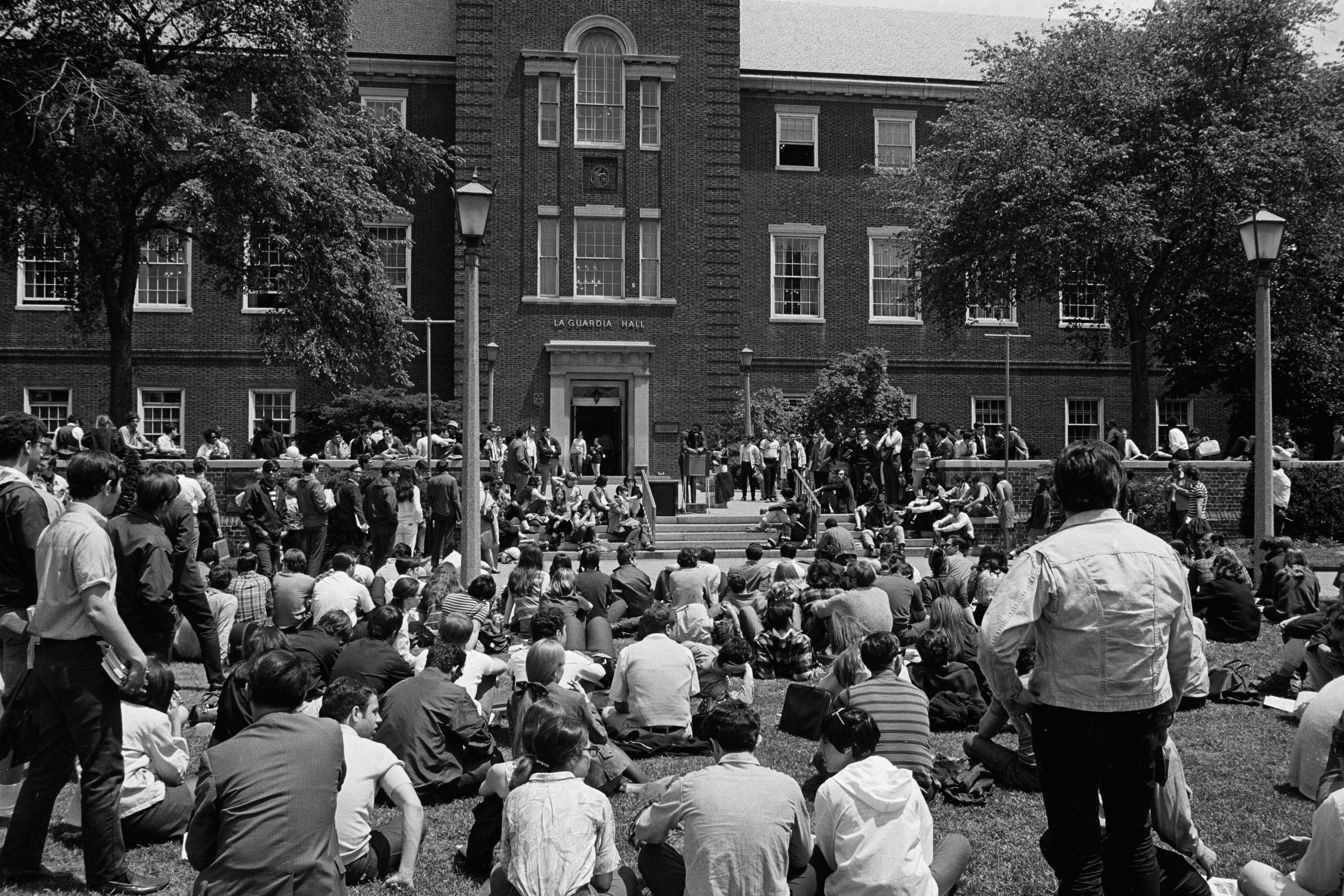
Jarvis Tyner, national chairman of the Du Bois Clubs, addresses a rally at Brooklyn College, May 22, 1968

In 1964 and 1965, the W.E.B. Du Bois Clubs of America contributed to the protests at the Berkeley campus of the University of California, the civil rights demonstrations in San Francisco, and the anti-Vietnam War march on Washington D.C.

In June 1965, members of the clubs attended a Communist Party training school as part of an effort to make communism more popular among the youth.

In 1966, the headquarters of the W.E.B. Du Bois Clubs of America were moved from San Francisco to Chicago. It was there that the 1966 convention of the organization was held, with speakers including Donna Allen of Women Strike for Peace, communist historian Herbert Aptheker, and radical attorney William Kunstler.

On August 27–28, 1966, the W.E.B. Du Bois Clubs of America hosted a national conference in Washington, D.C. under the slogan "for jobs, peace, and freedom." Over 125 people participated in the event, which included a mass meeting at the National Sylvan Theater and a protest demonstration by nearly 200 people against poverty and the war in Vietnam at the gates of the White House.

The Du Bois Clubs were active in demonstrations supporting the free speech movement and against military conscription. Such high profile activity led the federal government to take action against the organization throughout the latter half of the 1960s. In March 1966, U.S. Attorney General Nicholas Katzenbach petitioned the Subversive Activities Control Board to issue an order to the Du Bois Clubs ordering them to register with federal authorities as a so-called "communist front." This action led to a 1967 attempt at a legal challenge of the constitutionality of the Subversive Activities Control Board, a case which was lost in the United States Court of Appeals, and later in the United States Supreme Court, although Justices William O. Douglas and Hugo Black dissented. The Du Bois Clubs tried again in 1968, without success, to enjoin the government from forcing it to register as a "Communist front."

=== Dissolution and legacy ===
As the 1960s came to a close, the Du Bois Clubs were rendered virtually obsolete by various radical youth organizations of the New Left, including the Students for a Democratic Society. Membership in the Du Bois Clubs plummeted to less than 100, prompting the Communist Party to rethink its commitment to a formally non-party mass organization of youth. However, according to COINTELPRO papers, the Counter Intelligence Program claims to have been instrumental in the disbanding of the Du Bois Clubs.

In March 1969, the CPUSA sponsored a West Coast Youth Conference which attempted to restructure the W.E.B. Du Bois Clubs of America into a formal Young Communist adjunct of the adult party. This transformed organization originally intended to retain the "Du Bois Club" moniker, but in February 1970, the CPUSA decided to dissolve the Du Bois organization altogether in favor of an entirely new group.

This new organization was known variously as the Young Workers Liberation League or the Young Communist Liberation League, with state affiliates of the new organization adopting either name as local conditions warranted. Jarvis Tyner, the last national chairman of the Du Bois Clubs and a member of the National Committee of the adult CPUSA, was selected as the first national chairman of the new organization.

== See also ==
- Young Communist League, USA
