= Emmanuel Adekola =

Anglican bishop in Nigeria

Emmanuel Adeoye Adekola is an Anglican bishop in Nigeria: he is the current Bishop of Igbomina in the Anglican Province of Kwara.

He was consecrated as Bishop of Igbomina at the Cathedral Church of St. James the Great, Oke-Bola, Ibadan, on 30 July 2017.
