= Global Counterterrorism Forum =

Global counterterrorism organization

- Abbreviation: GCTF
- Formation: September 2011; 14 years ago
- Purpose: Counterterrorism
- Headquarters: The Hague, The Netherlands
- Website: https://www.thegctf.org/

The Global Counterterrorism Forum is an informal, apolitical, multilateral counter-terrorism platform that was launched officially in New York on 22 September 2011.

The GCTF's goal is to strengthen capabilities in order to develop a strategic, long-term approach to counter terrorism and prevent the violent extremist ideologies that underpin it. The GCTF's mission is to diminish terrorist recruitment and increase countries’ civilian capabilities for dealing with terrorist threats within their borders and regions.

The outcome documents of the forum are non-binding and not intended to create legal obligations for national governments.

== History ==
The GCTF was founded in September 2011.

In 2015, the GCTF established its headquarters in The Hague, The Netherlands.

On 1 January 2016, the International Centre for Counter-Terrorism began hosting the "Administrative Unit" of the GCTF.

On 18 and 20 September 2023, the GCTF held a meeting in New York. This resulted in the addition of Kenya and Kuwait, the first ever since the forum's founding.

In January 2026, United States President Donald Trump announced that the United States would withdraw from the organization.

== Structure and activities ==
=== Co-chairs ===
The GCTF has co-chairs, which serve for two-year terms. For the 2023–2025 period, the GCTF is co-chaired by the European Union and by Egypt.

=== Inspired institutions ===
The GCTF's members also established three "inspired institutions":

- Hedaydah, hosted by the United Arab Emirates, which focuses on preventing violent extremism. As of 2020, it has trained about 3,000 people.
- The International Institute for Justice and the Rule of Law (or IIJ), based in Malta, which trains criminal justice officials.
- The Global Community Engagement and Resilience Fund (or GCERF), based in Geneva, Switzerland, focuses on grassroots approaches to fighting terrorism.

== Members ==
The 32 members of the GCTF are:

- Algeria
- Australia
- Canada
- China
- Colombia
- Denmark
- Egypt
- European Union
- France
- Germany
- India
- Indonesia
- Italy
- Japan
- Jordan
- Kenya
- Kuwait
- Morocco
- Netherlands
- New Zealand
- Nigeria
- Pakistan
- Qatar
- Russia
- Saudi Arabia
- South Africa
- Spain
- Switzerland
- Turkey
- United Arab Emirates
- United Kingdom
