= Local Youth Corner Cameroon =

Cameroonian non-governmental organization

- Local Youth Corner Cameroon
- Abbreviation: LOYOC
- Formation: 2002
- Type: NGO
- Headquarters: Cameroon
- Location: Yaoundé, Cameroon
- Region served: Cameroon, Niger, and Chad
- Executive Director: Achaleke Christian Leke
- Website: https://www.loyocameroon.org/

Local Youth Corner Cameroon (LOYOC) is a Cameroonian non-governmental organization founded in 2002 to react on the increase in the socio-political and economic challenges facing young people. LOYOC focuses on youth empowerment in the domain of peacebuilding, healthy living, preventing and countering violent extremism.

Since its founding, working with its partners, LOYOC implements various youth-led projects in Cameroon, Chad, and Niger. In 2018, LOYOC started a free school initiative named ''The Salaam School Initiative'', to support the re-education of children affected by violent conflict in the Far North Region. In 2020, during COVID-19 crisis, LOYOC implemented One Person, One Hand Sanitizer initiative where they manufactured and donated homemade hand sanitizer for communities in Cameroon. It was awarded the best COVID-19 response organization in Cameroon. Since 2022, LOYOC has been launching NA WE WE Sports initiative in Cameroon with various themes and several objectives including building of social cohesion, promoting peace and healthy living. In 2023, LOYOC was awarded by African Union among 6 African civil society organizations outstand in championing peace, human rights, gender equality and women empowerment.

== History ==
LOYOC is youth-led non-profit organization created in 2002 by a group of young people who migrated from various communities across Cameroon into Yaoundé. With the burning aspiration to respond to some of the growing challenges which were facing young people, through LOYOC they started engaging in community development initiatives to reflect on solving problems within Cameroon communities like crime, poverty, unemployment, and others.

== Vision and mission ==
Since 2002, LOYOC has invested in promoting youth empowerment and participating in peacebuilding, preventing violent extremism and advancing sustainable development to ensure a violent-free community where youths are ambassadors of peace.

== Impact and activities ==
Since 2002, LOYOC has implemented various youth projects in Cameroon, Chad, and Niger, working with local and international partners including, UNDP, UNESCO, IOM, UNICEF, Commonwealth, World Bank, African Union, EU, and others.

In 2018, LOYOC implemented project in Cameroon named Creative Skills for Peace with aims of helping young violent offenders rebuild their lives and reintegrate in society. They targeted 300 prisoners between the ages of 13 and 35 years in eight prisons across Cameroon focusing on providing trainings about entrepreneurship development, vocational training, peacebuilding training, civic education, and sports for social cohesion and peace. In the same year, LOYOC started a free school initiative named ''The Salaam School Initiative'', to support the re-education of children affected by violent conflict in the Far North Region.

In 2020, LOYOC in partnership with U.S. Embassy in Cameroon, they launched a project entitled: Youth United for Peace: Addressing the Drivers to Hate Speech and Radicalization, with aim of supporting solidarity and peace in Cameroon. During the pandemic, LOYOC in collaboration with health practionals, lab scientist and youths formed a Youth Coalition against the spread of COVID-19 by implementing the operation of ONE Person ONE Hand Sanitizer initiative. The campaign left over 50 000 homemade hand sanitizers and PPEs donated to communities across Cameroon. The coalition was awarded the best COVID-19 response organization in Cameroon.

LOYOC is a member of The House of Sport Volunteers, a global initiative that connects skilled volunteers with sport organizations. Since 2022, LOYOC has been launching NA WE WE Sports initiative in Cameroon with various themes and several objectives including building of social cohesion, promoting peace and healthy living. The initiative highlighted to increase cohesion between internally displaced people from conflict-hit regions and host communities in Cameroon.

In 2024, LOYOC entered in strategic partnership with Cameroon Association of English-speaking Journalists (CAMASEJ) to collaborate locally with a focus on achieving peace and sustainable development in Cameroon. In 2024, LOYOC launched an initiative of training entertainers on using arts for social cohesion in Cameroon. Over a hundred actors, musicians, comedians and content creators were trained in Buea.
