= Anglican Diocese of New Bussa =

Anglican diocese in Nigeria

The Anglican Diocese of New Bussa is one of eight within the Anglican Province of Kwara, itself one of 14 ecclesiastical provinces within the Church of Nigeria. The current bishop is the Right Rev. Israel Amoo.
