= Philip Adeyemo =

Anglican bishop in Nigeria (born 1949)

- Born: May 19, 1949; Oyun, Kwara State, Nigeria
- Education: University of Ilorin
- Occupation: Anglican bishop
- Known for: Bishop of Omu-Aran

Philip Adeyemo (born 19 May 1949) is an Anglican bishop in Nigeria: he is Bishop of the Omu-Aran diocese, one of seven in the Anglican Province of Kwara, itself one of 14 within the Church of Nigeria.

Adeyemo was born on 19 May 1949 in Oyun, Kwara State. He was educated at the University of Ilorin and Imanuel College of Theology, Ibadan. He worked with gateway Insurance Co before training as a priest. He held incumbencies in Osere before becoming an Archdeacon.

He retired in 2019, having reached the mandatory retirement age of 70.
