= Alanda Kariza =

Indonesian writer, youth advocate and social entrepreneur

- Born: 23 February 1991 (age 35); Jakarta, Indonesia
- Education: University of Warwick, Coventry
- Years active: 2005 – present
- Organization: Sinergi Muda
- Known for: Initiating the Indonesian Youth Conference

Alanda Kariza (born February 23, 1991) is an Indonesian writer, youth advocate, and social entrepreneur. She initiated the Indonesian Youth Conference as a tool for young people in Indonesia to speak up and address their aspirations.

== Education ==
Alanda graduated from Binus University with a bachelor's degree in economics, majoring in international business. She received the Grand Scholarship for three years and Academic Merit Scholarship from the institution. She obtained her master's degree in behavioural economics at the University of Warwick, England, with the Chevening Scholarship. She is also an alumnus of Global Changemakers, One Young World, and a part of the World Economic Forum's Global Shapers. Alanda completed a one-year fellowship at The DO School and is a Fellow of the Royal Society of Arts.

== Bibliography ==
Fiction:

- Mint Chocolate Chips (young adult, Terrant Books, 2005)
- Vice Versa (short story anthology, Terrant Books, 2010)
- Pertama Kalinya (short story anthology, with Sitta Karina and other writers, Gramedia Pustaka Utama, 2010)
- Jika (short story anthology written with 12 other female writers, GagasMedia, 2012)
- Beats Apart (novel, with Kevin Aditya, Kepustakaan Populer Gramedia, 2015)

Non-fiction:

- The Journeys 2 (travel memoir anthology, GagasMedia, 2012)
- DreamCatcher (self-development/psychology, GagasMedia, 2012)
- Travel Young (self-development/travel memoir, GagasMedia, 2015)

== Youth advocacy & leadership ==
In 2009, Alanda was appointed to represent Indonesia in British Council's Global Changemakers Guildford Forum 2009 Following her initial involvement in the Global Changemakers, which is an international forum of young activists, she also represented Indonesia in the Global Changemakers at the G-20 London Summit where she got the chance to address young people's solutions for the 2008 financial crisis to former UK Prime Minister Gordon Brown, the President of Mexico Felipe Calderón, the President of Indonesia Susilo Bambang Yudhoyono, as well as other prominent figures such as Cherie Blair, David Miliband, and Hassan Wirajuda. Alanda has also presented her views on youth issues in front of the Pontifical Council for Culture, International Labour Organization, and World Economic Forum Annual Meeting in Davos.

== Recognition ==
Alanda became the youngest among Media Indonesia's 40 Most Influential People in 2010. On early 2010, Kariza received the ASHOKA Young Changemakers Awards 2010: Innovation in Clean Water and Sanitation due to her voluntary work through The Cure For Tomorrow.
