= Global Changemakers =

Swiss international youth organization

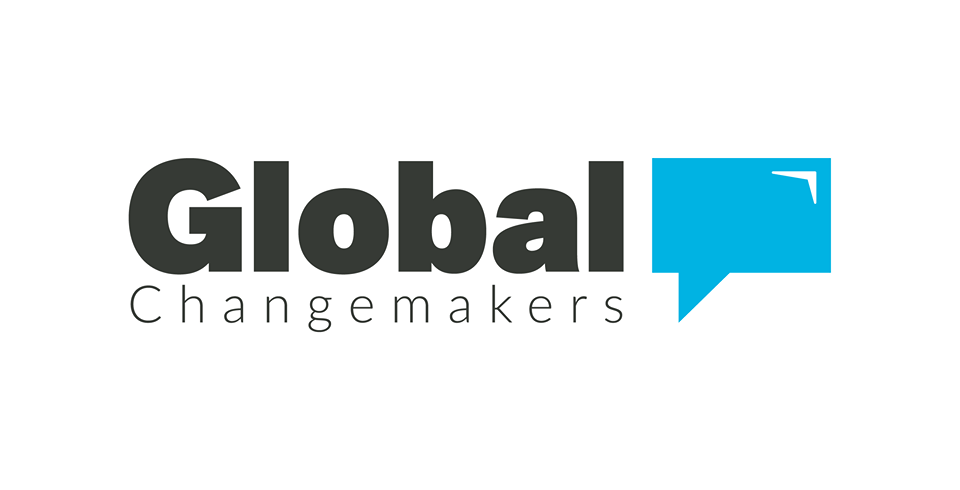
Global Changemakers

Global Changemakers is an international youth organisation with headquarters in Zurich, Switzerland. To date, they have directly trained thousands of young people and provided grants to over 550 youth-led projects globally.

In 2013, Global Changemakers became an independent organisation registered in Switzerland.

== History ==
Global Changemakers was founded in 2007 by the British Council in collaboration with the World Economic Forum as a way to bring the voices and experiences of young people to key policy and decision-makers at World Economic Forum events. In 2009, the mission of the programme expanded to include grant funding to support youth-led initiatives worldwide, and to showcase best practices in youth-led development. During the eight years under the British Council, Global Changemakers, became a close knit network of over 1,000 young 'changemakers' from 128 countries, supported 280 vetted youth-led projects through which 200,000 people got directly involved, and over 4 million people benefited.

In 2013, it became an independent, Swiss-based organisation pursuing the same goals. Since independence, Global Changemakers has continued their work under the same mission, to empower youth to catalyse positive social change in their local communities. The network has expanded to include Changemakers from 180 countries, and the grant programme has supported over 500 vetted youth-led projects. The Co-Founders of the organisation are Katherine Hermans, Gabriela Jaeger and Simon Moss.

== Operations Overview ==
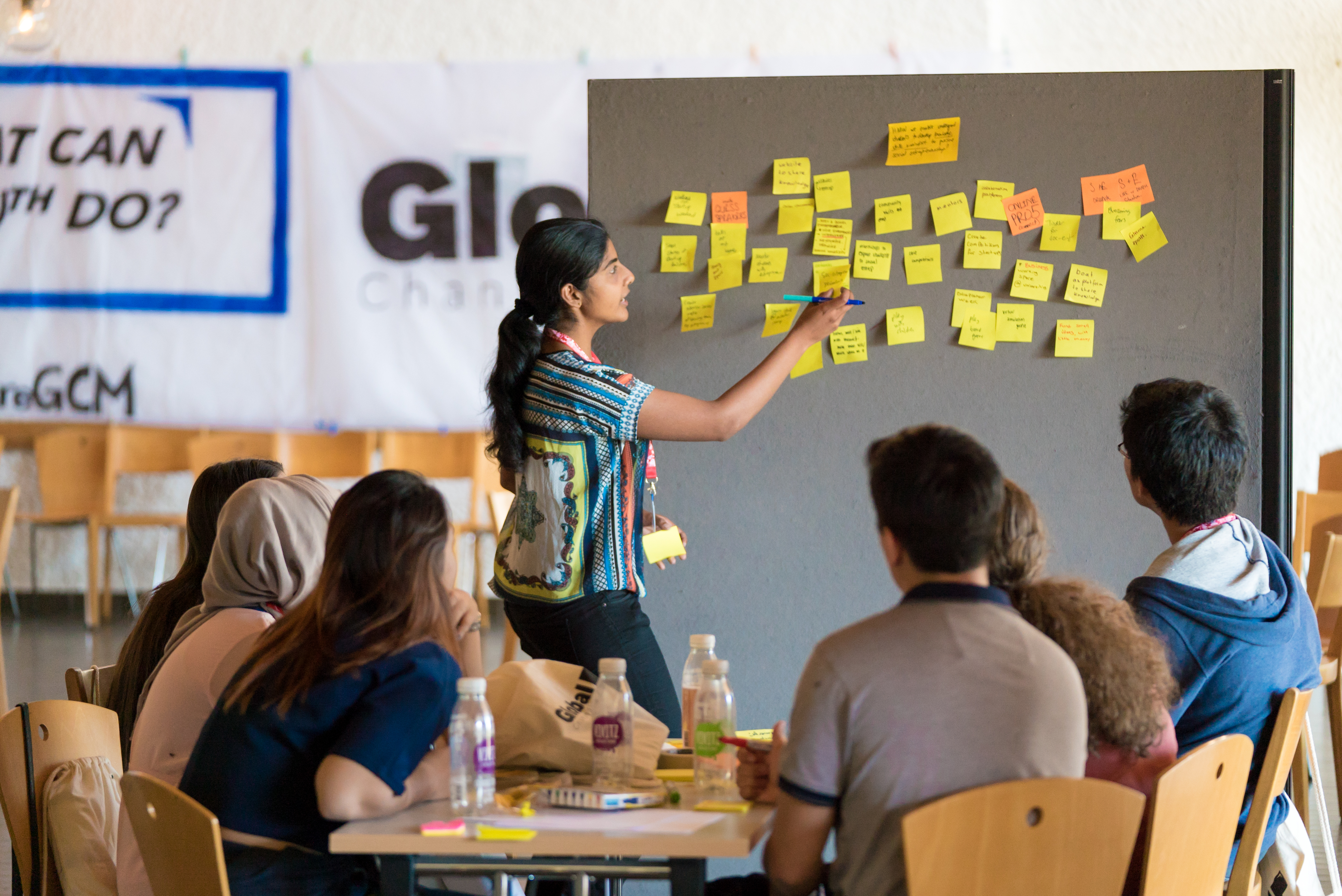
Working Group at the Global Youth Summit

Their flagship event is the annual Global Youth Summit. Each year, a cohort of 'Global Changemakers is selected to attend the fully funded summit.

Beyond the summit, Global Changemakers developed three ‘tool kits’ covering the subjects of project management, fundraising and social media, which have been translated into eight languages. They also host open online webinars.

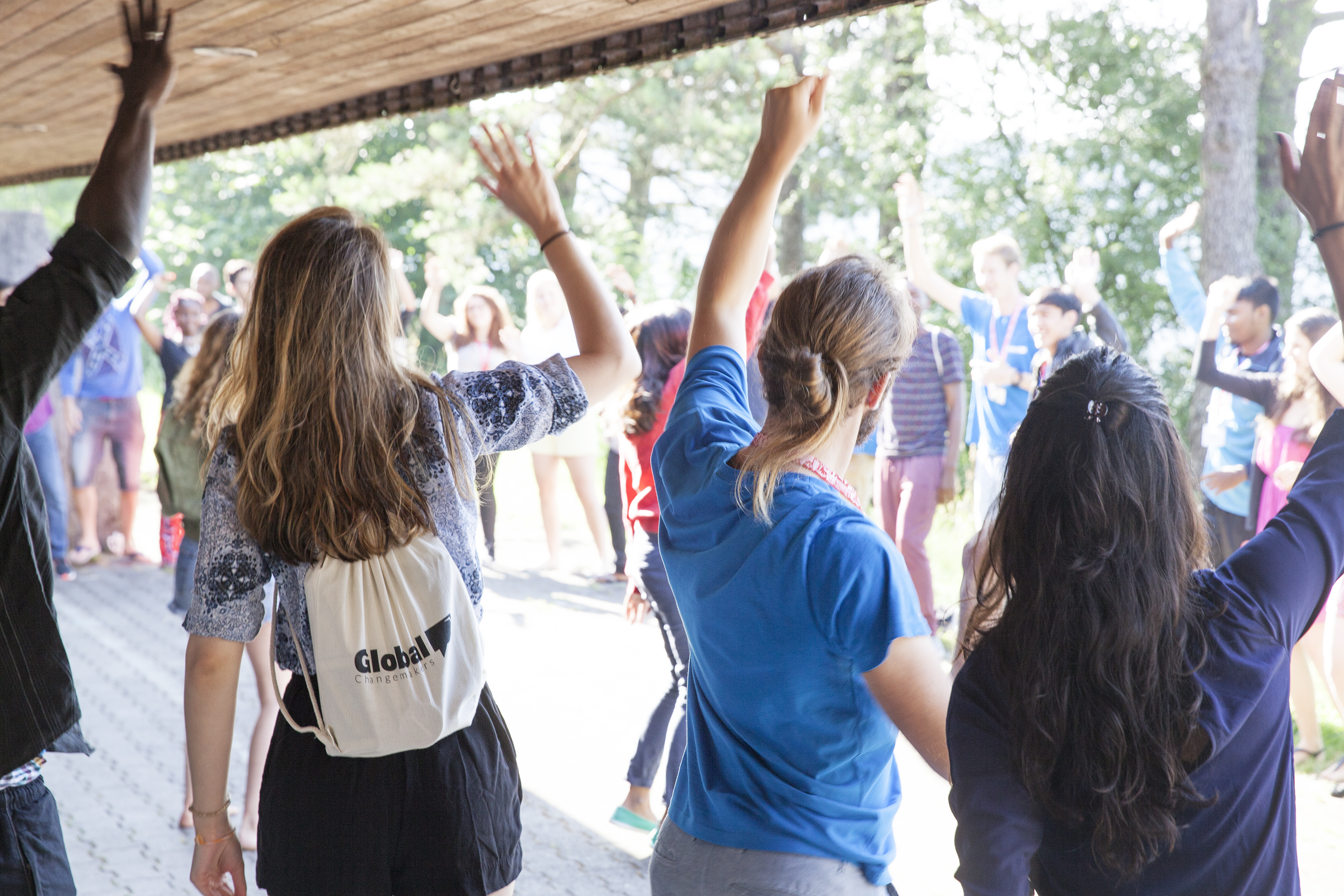
Global Youth Summit 2016

In 2019, Global Changemakers launched a Mentorship Programme, which takes place online over 12 weeks and is open to 15-22 year olds around the world, who are mentored by alumni of the organization. The program aims to provide participants with tools, skills and knowledge in fields such as project management, leadership and campaigning.

In 2020, Global Changemakers School was launched. It now offers online courses on Facilitation, Project Management and Menstruation, Sexual & Reproductive Health, and as of September 2025, over 8 thousand enrollments.

== Global Youth Summit ==
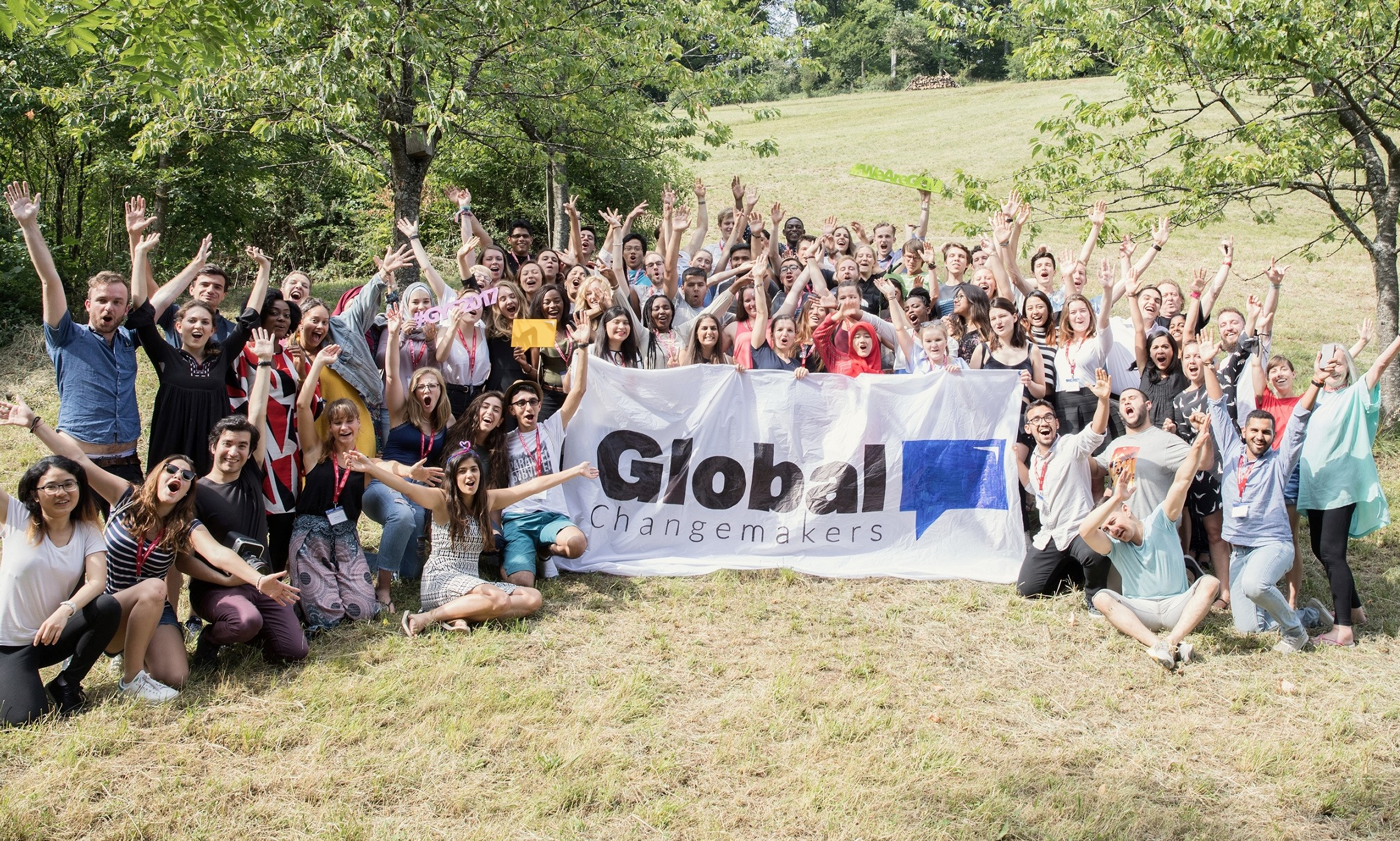
Global Youth Summit 2017

The Global Youth Summit is a fully funded week of skills development sessions, networking, learning and strategy sessions. Each year, Global Changemakers selects 60 young social entrepreneurs, community activists, volunteers and campaigners who are working towards attaining the Sustainable Development Goals to attend the summit. The selection is based on criteria such as previous achievements, but also expressed motivation, enthusiasm and innovation.

After the training at the summit, these 'changemakers' are provided with the opportunity to apply for grant funding to improve work that they are currently doing or to develop new projects. Many of the projects that have received funding were created through partnerships forged at the summit and these projects, and others, have grown into fully fledged organisations that continue operating to this day.

Changemakers from any country or region aged 18–23 at the time of each summit are eligible to apply to attend. The application process consists of a video application, written application and applicant interview to ensure that changemakers with the highest potential and motivation to create positive change are selected to attend the summit and join the network.

In 2020, Global Changemakers moved the Global Youth Summit online for the first time, organizing a series of online presentations and interactive sessions which took place from 24-28 April with over 1400 participants representing 125 countries.

Global Changemakers co-organized Summits with ATKV in Cape Town South Africa in 2023, 2024 and 2025.

== Impact ==
Since its inception at the Annual Meeting of the World Economic Forum in 2007, Global Changemakers has hosted over 50 regional and global youth workshops across the world, in places such as Amman, Beirut, Cape Town, Doha, Harare, Rio de Janeiro and London.

Global Changemakers reports that, as of September 2025, over 550 Changemakers youth-led projects have reached over 16 million individuals around the world. Global Changemakers and their work have been featured extensively in the media, including on CNN, BBC, CCTV, Al Jazeera and NDTV as well as in The Washington Post, Hindu Express, and Financial Times, online, and on the radio.

In 2023, Voice of America reported on the Africa Youth Summit in Cape Town South Africa https://www.youtube.com/results?search_query=voice+of+america+global+changemakers

== Notable alumni ==
- Daniel Gamboa, a Colombian-born New Zealand refugee rights advocate, Justice of the Peace (JP), and co-founder and chief executive of the New Zealand National Refugee Youth Council.
- Wali Shah, a Canadian speaker, poet, musician, and philanthropist.
- Michaela Mycroft, a South African disability rights activist who won the International Children's Peace Prize in 2011.
- Alanda Kariza, an Indonesian writer, youth advocate, and social entrepreneur.
- Anoka Primrose Abeyrathne, a Sri Lankan conservationist and social entrepreneur.
- Anna Oposa, a marine conservationist and co-founder of NGO Save Philippine Seas.
- Eddie Ndopu, a South African activist.
- Sam Johnson, a social entrepreneur and founder of the Student Volunteer Army.
- Marie-Claire Graf, a Swiss advocate for sustainable development and climate action.
- Andrew Leon Hanna, American social entrepreneur, author, and international human rights advocate
- Kanchan Amatya, Nepalese women's rights advocate, climate justice activist and social entrepreneur.
- Gillion Bosman, South African member of parliament.

== Partners ==
- The Possibilists. Global Changemakers is a member of The Possibilists. The Possibilists is an alliance of 16 of the world’s largest youth social innovation networks, including Changemakers xChange, Ashoka, the Obama Foundation, One Young World and the Diana Award. They have a combined total reach of thousands of young changemakers, activists and startup social entrepreneurs globally. Together, these organisations deliver real insights into the lives and work of changemakers and co-create systemic solutions to improve the conditions for Possibilists everywhere.
- Discovery Education. Since August 2020, Global Changemakers' Podcast has been featured on the Discovery Education portal.

Under the British Council, the Global Changemakers programme partnered with other independent non-profit and policy organisations, foundations, and media organisations. Each partnership was tailored to the individual needs and objectives of the respective entities – a sampling of existing partnerships follows:

- The World Economic Forum is Global Changemakers’ principal partner as it sponsors Changemakers to attend its annual and some of its regional meetings in addition to including Global Changemakers in its key policy bodies such as its Global Agenda Councils;
- The Nike Foundation, through its Girl Effect initiative, sponsors Global Changemaker projects which benefit adolescent girls in the Middle East and Africa. In addition, the Foundation sponsors the participation of network members working in girls’ rights at high level advocacy meetings like Women Deliver and the Clinton Global Initiative;
- The World Bank, through its World Bank Institute, sponsors activity and Global Changemakers’ project work, most recently in anti-corruption Global Changemakers is a British Council funded global youth programme for social entrepreneurs and community activists from 112 countries worldwide. Its mission is to empower youth to catalyse positive social change in their local communities.
