= Jarvis Tyner =

American politician (born 1941)

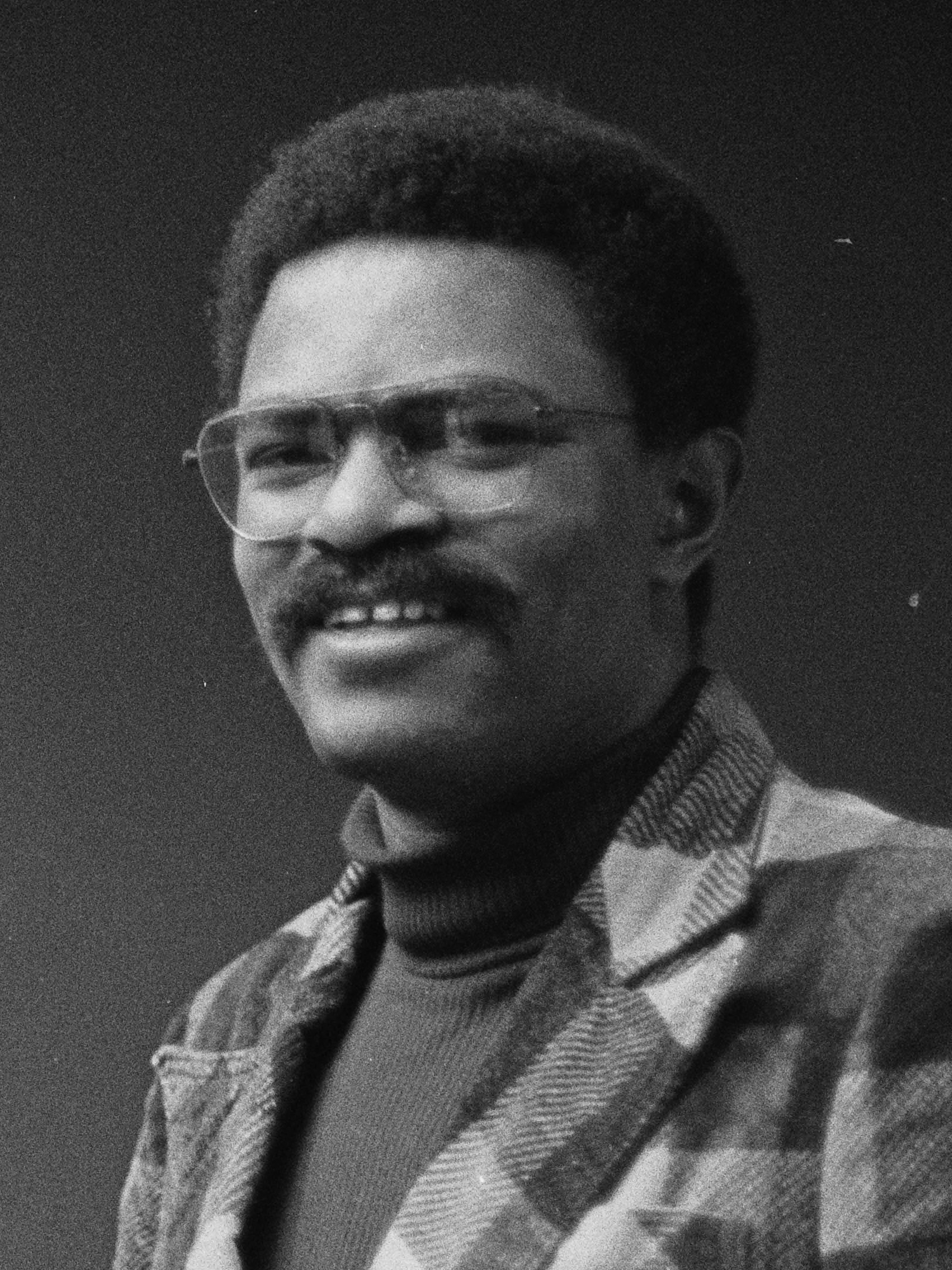
- Tyner in 1976

Executive Vice Chair of the Communist Party USA
- In office 1984–2014
- President: Gus Hall; Sam Webb
- Preceded by: Angela Davis
- In office 1972–1980
- President: Gus Hall
- Preceded by: James W. Ford
- Succeeded by: Angela Davis

Personal details
- Born: July 11, 1941 (age 85) Philadelphia, Pennsylvania, U.S.
- Party: Communist Party USA
- Occupation: Political writer, activist
- Website: http://cpusa.org

Jarvis Tyner (born July 11, 1941) is an American activist and the former Executive Vice Chair of the Communist Party USA (CPUSA). He is a resident of Manhattan, New York City. In 1972 and 1976, he ran on the Communist Party ticket for Vice President of the United States.

== Life and career ==
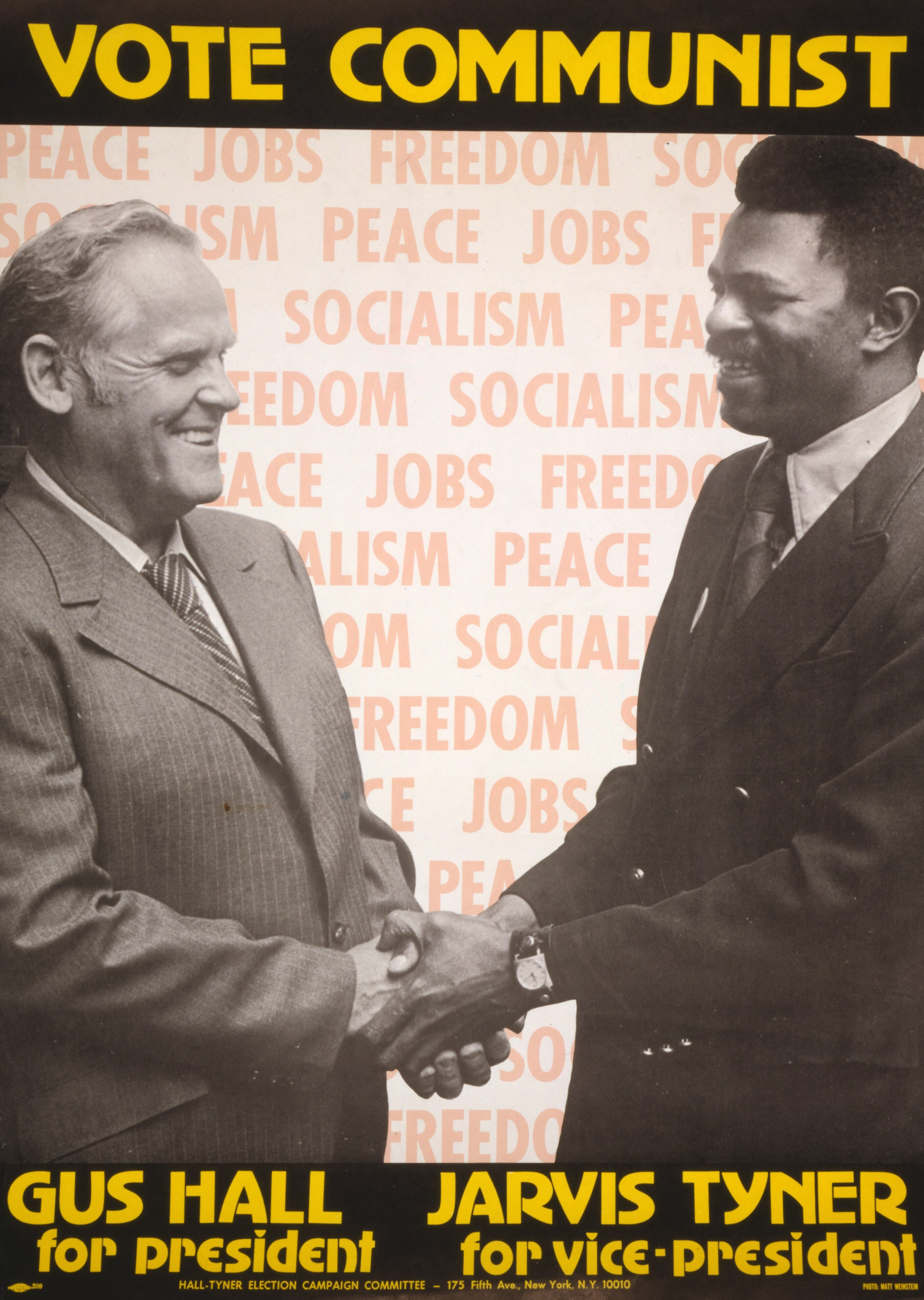
Poster for the Gus Hall–Tyner ticket in the 1976 United States presidential election.

Tyner was born in 1941 in the Mill Creek community of West Philadelphia, and graduated from West Philadelphia High School. In 1960, he led efforts to integrate lunch counters at Philadelphia businesses as well as the television program American Bandstand, and participated in the March on Washington in 1963.

He joined the Communist Party USA in 1961. After several years working in various industrial jobs in the Philadelphia area, where he was a member of the Amalgamated Lithographers of America and Teamsters, he moved to New York in 1967 to become the national chair of the DuBois Clubs of America, and later founding chair of the Young Workers Liberation League. He was the Communist Party USA candidate for vice president of the U.S. in 1972 and 1976, running with party leader Gus Hall. In the 1985 New York City mayoral election, Tyner participated as an independent candidate for the People Before Profits organization, obtaining 3,370 votes.

Tyner has been a public spokesperson for the CPUSA, presenting its positions against racism, imperialism, and war. Tyner has also contributed to the CPUSA's Political Affairs Magazine and its People's World. He currently resides in the Inwood section of Manhattan, New York City.

== Relatives ==
Jarvis Tyner is the younger brother of jazz pianist McCoy Tyner.

Party political offices
Preceded by James W. Ford	Communist Party USA vice presidential candidate 1972 (lost), 1976 (lost)	Succeeded by Angela Davis
