= Anglican Diocese of Jebba =

Anglican diocese in Nigeria

The Anglican Diocese of Jebba is one of eight dioceses within the Anglican Province of Kwara, itself one of 14 ecclesiastical provinces within the Church of Nigeria. The current bishop is the Right Rev. Oluwaseun Aderogba, who succeeded Timothy Adewole.
