= Jacqueline O'Neill =

Canadian diplomat

Ambassador Jacqueline O'Neill
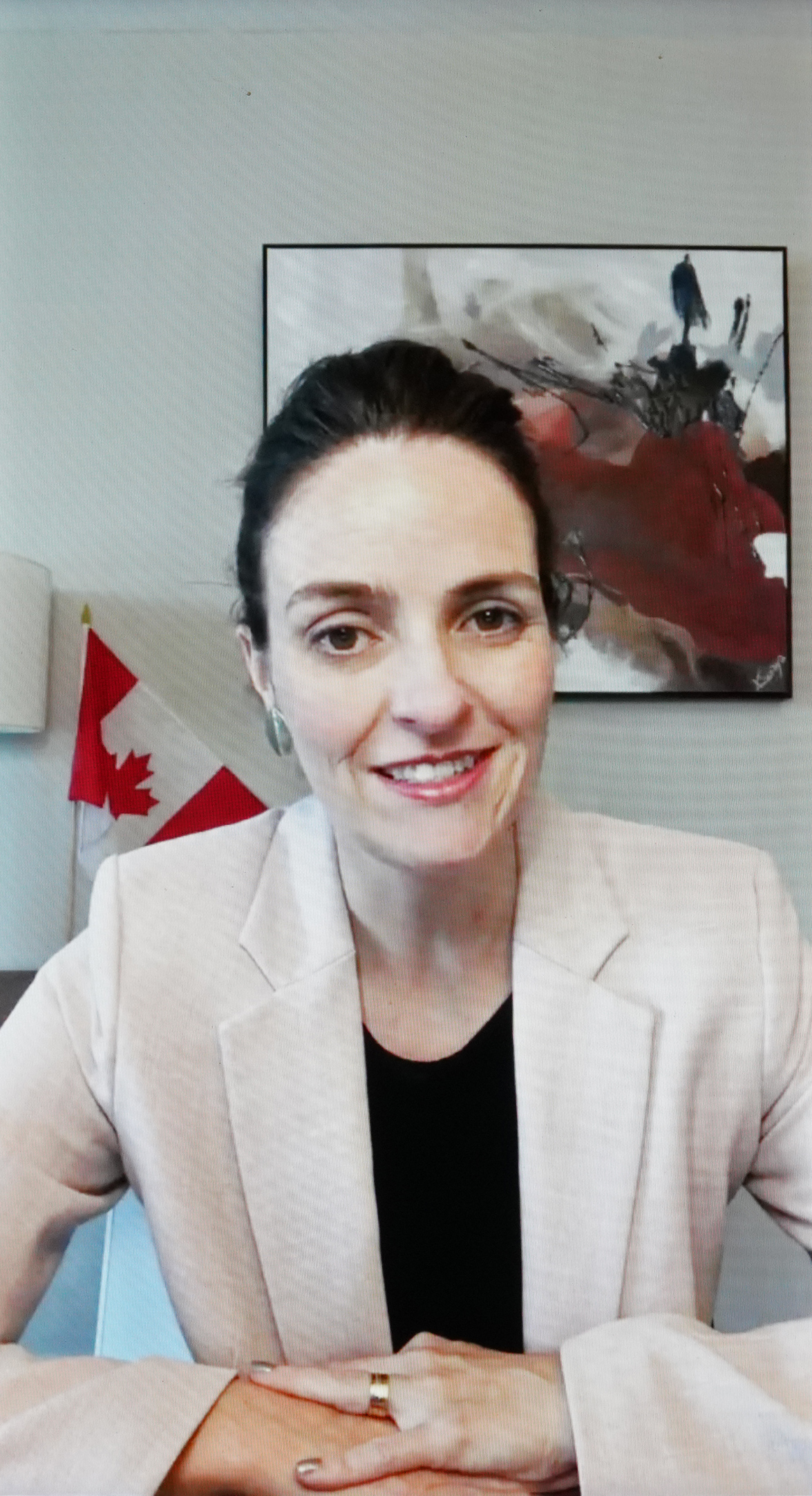

1st Ambassador for Women, Peace and Security
- Incumbent
- Assumed office June 2019

Personal details
- Born: St. Albert, Alberta, Canada
- Education: University of Alberta; Harvard Kennedy School of Government

Jacqueline O'Neill is a Canadian diplomat from St. Albert, Alberta. She is Canada's first Ambassador for Women, Peace and Security, and a co-founder of the Roméo Dallaire Child Soldiers Initiative.

== Early life and education ==
O'Neill is from St. Albert, Alberta. Her mother, Mary O'Neill, was a member of the Legislative Assembly of Alberta and her father, Jack O'Neill, was a deputy minister in Alberta. She attended St. Albert Catholic High School. O'Neill has a bachelor’s degree in commerce from the University of Alberta, and a master’s degree in public policy from the Harvard Kennedy School of Government.

== Career ==
From 2011, O'Neill worked as a federal government adviser on advancing peace and security for women. She has previously worked for NATO, the Organization for Security and Co-operation in Europe, and the United Nations. Along with Roméo Dallaire, she was a co-founder of the Roméo Dallaire Child Soldiers Initiative. O’Neill has been Global Fellow at the Woodrow Wilson International Center for Scholars, an adjunct professor at Georgetown University, and has served on the board of directors of the Canadian International Council.

In June 2019, O'Neill was appointed as Canada's first ambassador for women, peace and security.
