= Anglican Diocese of Omu-Aran =

Anglican diocese in Nigeria

The Anglican Diocese of Omu-Aran is one of eight dioceses within the Anglican Province of Kwara, itself one of 14 ecclesiastical provinces within the Church of Nigeria.

The diocese was established in 2007, and the pioneer bishop was Philip Adeyemo. On Adeyemo's retirement in 2019, he was succeeded by the Right Rev. Festus Oyetola Sobanke.
