= Anglican Diocese of Ekiti Kwara =

Anglican diocese in Nigeria

The Anglican Diocese of Ekiti Kwara is one of eight dioceses within the Anglican Province of Kwara, itself one of 14 ecclesiastical provinces within the Church of Nigeria. The see became vacant after the translation of the pioneer Bishop Andrew Ajayi. He was recently translated to Ekiti Anglican Diocese.
