= Olajide Adebayo =

Anglican bishop in Nigeria (born 1958)

Olajide Adebayo (born October 27, 1958) is an Anglican bishop in Nigeria; he is Bishop of Igbomina-West, one of eight in the Anglican Province of Kwara, itself one of 14 within the Church of Nigeria. He presents a radio show, "Hymns of Praise".

== Early life and education ==
Adebayo was born in Ado-Ekiti, Ekiti State, He holds an LL.B (Hons) in Law from Lagos State University and was called to the Nigerian Bar in 2006. He also holds a Master of Arts in Peace and Conflict Studies from the University of Ibadan.
