= Anglican Diocese of Igbomina-West =

Anglican diocese in Nigeria

The Anglican Diocese of Igbomina-West is one of eight dioceses in the Anglican Province of Kwara, itself one of 14 ecclesiastical provinces within the Church of Nigeria. The current bishop is the Right Rev. Olajide Adebayo.

The diocese was established in 2009.

== Bishops ==
Name	Years
James Akinola	2009–2016
Olajide Adebayo	2016–
