= Anoka Primrose Abeyrathne =

Sri Lankan eco-social entrepreneur/environmentalist

Dr. Anoka Primrose Abeyrathne FRSA
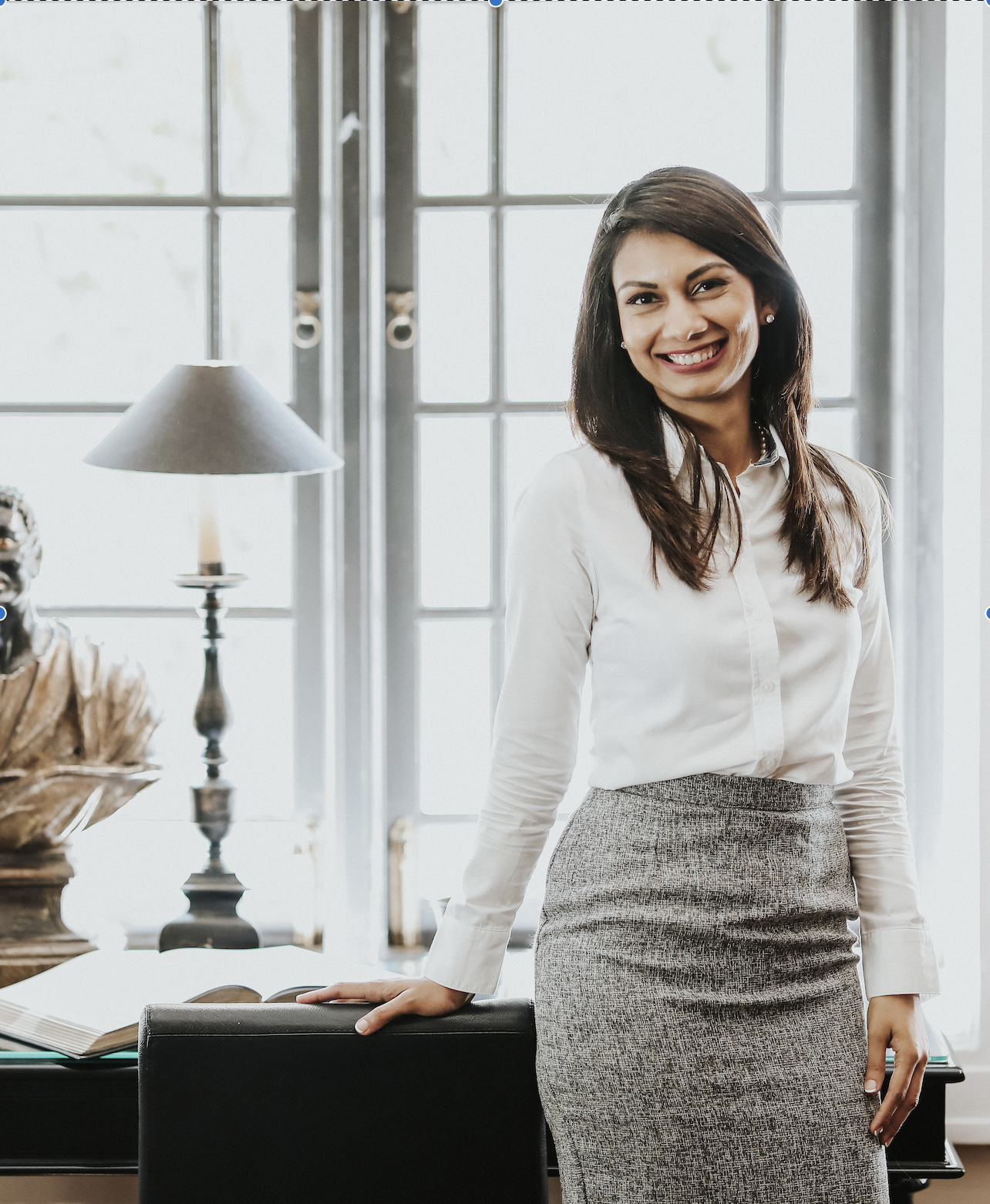
- Education: LLB; Attorney; Environmental Science; Development Economics; University of Cambridge; Bishop's College; University of London
- Occupations: Conservationist, Environmentalist, Social Entrepreneur, Lawyer, Educationist
- Known for: Organic industry, Tech innovation, Mangrove conservation, Social enterprise
- Notable work: Mangrove replantation and popularization, Animal Welfare Bill Sri Lanka
- Awards: Commonwealth Youth Award; Forbes 30 Under 30; World Economic Forum New Champion; All Island Winner Solo Piano Sri Lanka Festival of Music; World Economic Forum Global Shaper; Cosmopolitan 35 Under 35; World Youth Forum Award
- Website: anokaabe.com

Anoka Primrose Pelpola Abeyrathne (Sinhala: අනෝකා අබේරත්න), also known as Anoka Abeyratne, is a Sri Lankan conservationist, international award-winning social entrepreneur, acclaimed speaker, best selling author and activist on sustainable development issues including GEDSI, who served as the Asia-Pacific representative to United Nation Habitat YAB. She is the elected Environment Lead of the Royal Commonwealth Society. In 2019, Abeyrathne appeared in the list of "Iconic Sri Lankan Women Who Have Shaped History" with relatives UN Human Rights awardee Sunila Abeysekera and Ambassador Manel Abeysekera and featured as one of the 5 Young Women Changing the World in 2023. She is the elected Royal Commonwealth Society regional coordinator for Asia.

== Early life ==
Abeyrathne completed her education in biological sciences at Bishop's College whilst excelling academically and in sports including Muay Thai and is an accomplished pianist who has won the national competitions for solo piano.

She studied biology, law and business. She gained experience working at the United Nations as well as the corporate sector whilst running an award winning social enterprise. Having read for an undergraduate degree in law, she graduated with a master's degree from the Judge Business School of the University of Cambridge.

== Activism and work ==
When the 2004 tsunami struck Sri Lanka, Abeyrathne started volunteering to improve the local environment by planting Mangrove trees called Growin' Money. Growin' Money provided families the opportunity to gain an income through handicrafts, organic farming, and eco-tourism, along with offering access to education and skills training. The movement has replanted over 60,000 Mangroves in over 5 countries while training over 50000 women and youth over 10 years. For her work as an environmentalist and activism she was selected as a Global Changemaker in 2011.

Anoka initiated Sri Lanka's most signed petition to revive and advocate for the stagnant Animal Welfare Bill with over 130,000 signatures from citizens and organisations concerned about animal welfare in Sri Lanka. This petition was handed over to the minister in charge to be tabled in Parliament. This inspired a trend of creating petitions for social causes in the country.

Upon being sexually harassed on the streets of Colombo, Abeyrathne created a video of the incident which sparked nationwide outrage regarding the perpetrator, which resulted in the perpetrator being jailed for the crime. Abeyrathne's actions sparked a movement across the country of creating videos of sexual harassers, providing easier access for justice for many women and girls.

Abeyrathne has experience in the corporate, civil and government sectors. She continues to support conservation and climate work, by empowering vulnerable communities. She recently stated that environmental advocacy cannot be only donor driven and must also listen to the needs of the community as well as understand ground realities.

== Awards and recognition ==
Abeyrathne was elected to lead the Environmental Working Group of the Royal Commonwealth Society - the first Sri Lankan to be accoladed. She is a United States Department of State IVLP awardee and a Australia Awards recipient from the Government of Australia and DFAT. In 2020, she delivered the keynote address to mark the International Women's Day 2020 and rang the opening bell of the Colombo Stock Exchange. She is featured in the Cosmopolitan Magazine Sri Lanka's inaugural 35 under 35 list and is Sri Lanka's first female World Economic Forum New Champion. In 2019, Abeyrathne appeared in a list of "Iconic Sri Lankan Women Who Have Shaped History". She received the Commonwealth Youth Award and featured on the Forbes 30 under 30 list. She served as one of the 12 shapers on the United Nations–World Economic Forum Sustainable Development Council working towards mainstreaming sustainability, and is the first female New Champion of the World Economic Forum in Sri Lanka. Abeyratne delivered the keynote speech at the Youth Leaders Forum, Commonwealth Asia Youth Ministers Meeting. She was elected to the UN Habitat Global Youth Advisory Board and featured as one of the 5 Young Women Changing the World in 2023.

Being the youngest speaker on Sri Lanka's first Social Innovation Forum and the Commonwealth Women's Affairs Ministerial Meeting, she gave a keynote speech at the Youth Leaders Forum, Clinton Global Initiative, and the Commonwealth Asia Region Youth Ministers Meeting 2015. Abeyrathne continues engagement in disaster management and sustainability analysis under the auspices of the Institute of National Security Studies Sri Lanka – Ministry of Defence (Sri Lanka). Abeyrathne received a World Youth award in 2017 for her contribution to youth and sustainability and she is a British Council International Climate Champion.
