= Anglican Diocese of Igbomina =

Anglican diocese in Nigeria

The Anglican Diocese of Igbomina is one of eight dioceses within the Anglican Province of Kwara, itself one of 14 ecclesiastical provinces within the Church of Nigeria. Bishop Michael Akinyemi, who was also the Archbishop of the Province, retired in 2017 and was succeeded by Emmanuel Adekola, previously Sub-Dean of the Cathedral Church of the Advent, Abuja.

Akinyemi was the founding bishop of Igbomina, a post he held from 1999.

== Bishops of Igbomina ==
- 1999 - 2017 Bishop Michael Akinyemi
- 2017 - date Bishop Emmanuel Adekola
