= Carol Bellamy =

American politician (born 1942)

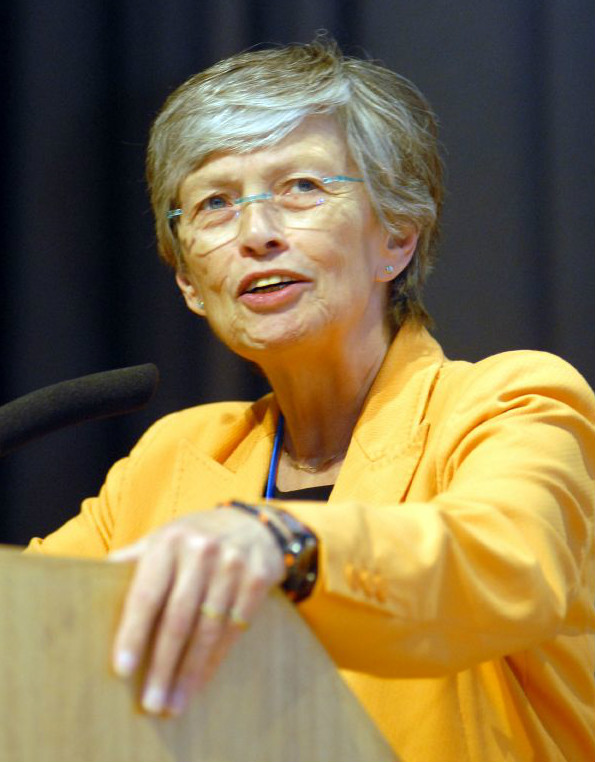
- Bellamy in 2008

Executive Director of UNICEF
- In office May 1, 1995 – May 1, 2005
- Secretary General: Boutros Boutros-Ghali; Kofi Annan
- Preceded by: Richard Jolly (Acting)
- Succeeded by: Ann Veneman

13th Director of the Peace Corps
- In office October 7, 1993 – May 1, 1995
- President: Bill Clinton
- Preceded by: Elaine Chao
- Succeeded by: Mark Gearan

President of the New York City Council
- In office January 1, 1978 – December 31, 1985
- Preceded by: Paul O'Dwyer
- Succeeded by: Andrew Stein

Member of the New York State Senate
- In office January 1, 1973 – December 31, 1977
- Preceded by: John J. Marchi
- Succeeded by: Martin Connor
- Constituency: 23rd district (1973–1974); 25th district (1975–1977)

Personal details
- Born: January 14, 1942 (age 84) Plainfield, New Jersey, U.S.
- Party: Democratic
- Other political affiliations: Liberal (1985)
- Education: Gettysburg College (BA); New York University (JD)

Carol Bellamy (born January 14, 1942) is an American nonprofit executive and former politician. She is chair of the board of the Global Community Engagement and Resilience Fund (GCERF). Previously, she was director of the Peace Corps, executive director of the United Nations Children's Fund (UNICEF), and president and CEO of World Learning. She is also the chair of children's rights advocacy organization ECPAT International, working to end the sexual exploitation of children. After three terms in the New York State Senate, she was the first woman to be elected to any citywide office in NYC as President of the New York City Council, a position she held until her unsuccessful bid for Mayor of New York in 1985; she was the second to last person to hold this position.

== Early life and education ==
Bellamy was born in Plainfield, New Jersey in 1942, and raised in Scotch Plains, graduating from Scotch Plains-Fanwood High School in 1959. She attended Gettysburg College, where she was a member of Delta Gamma, and graduated in 1963. She earned her J.D. degree from New York University School of Law in 1968, and was a Peace Corps volunteer in Guatemala from 1963 to 1965.

== Business career ==
Bellamy was a managing director at Bear Stearns from 1990 to 1993, a Principal at Morgan Stanley from 1986 to 1990, and an associate in the New York law firm of Cravath, Swaine & Moore from 1968 to 1971. In 1968, she was to be one of the subjects of Jean-Luc Godard's film One A.M. (later released as One P.M. by D. A. Pennebaker) where she described her philosophy of using business to accomplish social change. Her speech was then satirized by Rip Torn wearing a US Civil War uniform in front of a Brooklyn middle school class.

== Political career ==
=== New York State Senate ===
Bellamy was a member of the New York State Senate from 1973 to 1977, sitting in the 180th, 181st and 182nd New York State Legislatures.

=== New York City Council ===
She mounted an uphill campaign for President of the New York City Council in 1977. While her opponents spent hundreds of thousands of dollars in their campaigns, Bellamy carried on with just $90,000 in funds, and, despite her initially low public profile, managed to finish a strong second in the Democratic primary with 25 percent of the vote, behind the incumbent Paul O'Dwyer, who got 30 percent, and ahead of City Councilman Carter Burden, Assemblyman Leonard Stavisky and developer Abe Hirschfeld. Because no candidate had received at least 40 percent, O'Dwyer and Bellamy met in a runoff two weeks later, which she won handily, getting 58 percent of the vote. In the November general election, she easily beat the Republican candidate, Assemblyman John Esposito, by a 5-to-1 margin, becoming the first woman elected to citywide office in New York. She held the Council Presidency until her unsuccessful bid for Mayor of New York in 1985.

=== Other positions ===
Bellamy was a member of the Metropolitan Transportation Authority Board until she resigned from the board at the behest of Governor Mario Cuomo in 1985. In 1982 she considered running for Governor of New York. In 1990 she was an unsuccessful candidate for New York State Comptroller. She served on the New York State Board of Regents, which oversees all state education activities and the state Department of Education, from 2005 to 2006.

=== Peace Corps ===
From 1993 to 1995, Bellamy was the director of the Peace Corps. Appointed by then US President Bill Clinton, she was the first director to have previously been a volunteer.

== GCERF ==
As of 2014 Carol Bellamy is the chair of the governing board of the Global Community Engagement and Resilience Fund which is the first global effort to support local, community-level initiatives aimed at strengthening resilience against violent extremist agendas, for example through job creation and empowering women and youth. As a public-private partnership operating in the fields of security and development, the fund works with governments, civil society, and the private sector in beneficiary countries to support national strategies to address the local drivers of violent extremism.

== UNICEF ==
Bellamy was appointed to the position of executive director of UNICEF in 1995 by Boutros Boutros-Ghali, then the Secretary-General of the United Nations. She was granted a second five-year term in 2000 by Boutros-Ghali's successor, Kofi Annan. UN policy states that agency heads may serve no more than two five-year terms.

Bellamy is credited with having left behind a fiscally sound organization with strong internal controls. She increased UNICEF's resources from roughly $800 million ($966 m in 2004 terms) in 1994 to more than $1.8 billion in 2004.

== NGOs ==
Bellamy was appointed the president and CEO of the Brattleboro, Vermont-based World Learning and president of its School for International Training in 2005. World Learning is a global organization with operations in more than 75 countries that fosters global citizenship through experiential education and community-driven development programs. Organizations that fund World Learning include the Tides Foundation and Rockefeller Financial Services.

On July 25, 2007, Bellamy was elected chair of the board of directors of the Fair Labor Association (FLA). The FLA advocates for workers' interests by promoting international labor standards. "For eight years the FLA has been strengthening its capacity to work with companies, factories, civil society organizations and others to end sweatshop labor and protect workers' rights. It is now moving beyond its rigorous monitoring program to focus greater attention on identifying the root causes of these problems and to develop sustainable compliance programs," said Bellamy in accepting the position.

== Other ==
In April 2009, Bellamy was appointed as chair of the International Baccalaureate (IB) board of governors. Between 2010 and 2013, Carol Bellamy was the chair of the board of directors of the Global Partnership for Education. Bellamy is a member of the board of the American University of Beirut.

== Honors ==
In 1981, she was selected to be one of the first Young Leaders of the French-American Foundation.

Bellamy is a former Fellow of the Harvard Institute of Politics at the John F. Kennedy School of Government and an honorary member of Pi Alpha Alpha. At its 1982 commencement ceremonies, Barnard College awarded Bellamy the college's highest honor, the Medal of Distinction.

Bellamy received an honorary Doctor of Humane Letters from Bates College in 2003. She returned to her alma mater, the NYU School of Law, to deliver a commencement day speech in May 2006.

For her work with UNICEF, she was awarded Japan's Order of the Rising Sun in 2006. In 2009, she was recognized for her work by France with the Legion of Honour.

New York State Senate
Preceded by John J. Marchi	Member of the New York Senate from the 23rd district 1973–1974	Succeeded by Vander L. Beatty
Preceded by Paul P. E. Bookson	Member of the New York Senate from the 25th district 1975–1977	Succeeded by Martin Connor
Political offices
Preceded by Paul O'Dwyer	President of the New York City Council; 1978–1985	Succeeded by Andrew Stein
Party political offices
Preceded by Mary Codd	Liberal nominee for Mayor of New York City; 1985	Succeeded by Rudy Giuliani
Preceded by Herman Badillo	Democratic nominee for Comptroller of New York; 1990	Succeeded by Carl McCall
Government offices
Preceded by Elaine Chao	Director of the Peace Corps; 1993–1995	Succeeded by Mark Gearan
Diplomatic posts
Preceded by Richard Jolly; Acting	Executive Director of UNICEF; 1995–2005	Succeeded by Ann Veneman
Positions in intergovernmental organisations
Preceded by ???	Chair of the Global Partnership for Education; 2010–2013	Succeeded by Julia Gillard
