= Dallaire Centre of Excellence for Peace and Security =

Canadian Minister of National Defence Harjit S. Sajjan announced the creation of the Dallaire Centre of Excellence for Peace and Security on June 25, 2019. The Centre of Excellence is located at the Canadian Defence Academy, and former General and former Senator Romeo Dallaire will play a leadership role.
