= Evans Wadongo =

Kenyan engineer (born 1986)

- Evans Wadongo showcasing the MwangaBora
- Born: 11 March 1986 (age 40); Kakamega, Kenya
- Occupation: engineer
- Known for: SDFA-Kenya
- Website: evanswadongo.com

Evans Wadongo (born 11 March 1986) is a Kenyan engineer, a partner at Wadson Ventures, the co-founder of GreenWize Energy Ltd, the founder of SDFA-Kenya, and one of CNN's top ten heroes of 2010. He is a graduate in electronic and computer engineering from the Jomo Kenyatta University of Agriculture and Technology in Kenya.

== Early life and education ==
Wadongo was born in the Western part of Kenya. Both his father and mother were teachers. He attended Manyonje and Bisunu Primary Schools, rural primary schools, where he walked over 10 kilometres (6.2 mi) daily to reach the school. His home and school had no electricity, but he braved the odds to join Kakamega High School, where he managed to graduate with top marks, and was listed among the top 100 best students in Kenya Certificate of Secondary Education examinations of 2002. He later joined Jomo Kenyatta University of Agriculture and Technology and graduated in July 2009 with a BSc (honors) in Electronics and Computer Engineering. He later graduated with a Msc. Development Management in 2018.

While at the university, Wadongo was an active member of the Rotaract Club (part of Rotary International), where he participated in various community initiatives, including the donation of clothes to children homes and street clean-up campaigns. He interned at Kenyatta National Hospital in 2006, at Metsec Ltd in 2007, and at UUNET Kenya (now MTN Business Kenya) in 2008.

== Enterprises ==
Wadongo designed a solar lamp which he calls 'MwangaBora (Swahili for "Good Light") in 2004 as a way to address poor education, climate change, health and poverty in rural areas in Kenya. Wadongo named the entire project 'Use Solar, Save Lives' as he aimed to use solar technology as a way to save lives in the poor communities he grew up in.

He later founded Sustainable Development For All-Kenya (SDFA-Kenya), a non-profit in 2006. SDFA-Kenya was officially registered in Kenya in June 2007 and its primary focus is environment, education and economic empowerment. Wadongo was the founding chairman. SDFA-Kenya adopted the 'Use Solar, Save Lives' programme as its main focus program as it combines the three aspects of education, environment, and economic empowerment. SDFA-Kenya is now working in all regions in Kenya. In addition, it is now working in Malawi in partnership with Jacaranda Foundation. To date, SDFA-Kenya under the leadership of Mr. Wadongo has influenced directly hundreds of thousands of people and, indirectly, millions of others.

Apart from being the chairman of the organisation, Wadongo doubled up as a Project Manager from 2006 to 2008. From 2008 to July 2010, Wadongo was the chairman and Programs Director. He is currently the Chairman of SDFA-Kenya.

In July 2011, in response to the increased publicity from the international community, Wadongo launched Just One Lamp, a globally-focused campaign that raised funding and awareness for MwangaBora lamps. Wadongo is now expanding his effort beyond Kenya and bringing his model to other developing nations.

In 2016, Wadongo co-founded GreenWize Energy Limited, a for-profit social enterprise that designs and implements renewable energy solutions.

Currently, Wadongo is a partner at Wadson Ventures, an early-stage venture builder that supports entrepreneurs in Sub Saharan Africa

== Awards and recognition ==
In recognition of his work in Kenya, Wadongo has received numerous awards and publicity from the international community over the past few years.

Wadongo was voted one of CNN's top ten heroes of 2010.

On 30 March 2011, Wadongo was named one of three recipients of the inaugural Mikhail Gorbachev Awards for "The Man Who Changed the World." His fellow inaugural recipients of this award were Sir Tim Berners Lee, inventor of the World Wide Web and Ted Turner, media mogul and founder of CNN. The ceremony, held in London, also celebrated Gorbachev's 80th birthday.

Wadongo won the Outstanding Social Entrepreneur in Africa at the Africa Awards for Entrepreneurship held in Mauritius in 2013.

Wadongo was named Social Entrepreneur of the Year by the Schwab Foundation for 2011. The awards ceremony was held in Cape Town, South Africa, during the World Economic Forum for Africa. He was also among "20 Men Who Will Shape the Next 20 Years" by UK's Esquire magazine in 2011, and an Unreasonable Institute Fellow in 2011.

SDFA-Kenya is also a SEED award winner for 2011.

Wadongo was a finalist at the inaugural Innovation Prize for Africa held in Addis Ababa in 2012. He also received the African International Achievers Award in 2012.

Evans Wadongo and his story have been featured on CNN, BBC, AFP, The New Yorker, China Central Television, Reuters, France 24, Discovery Channel, MBC South Korea, Deutsche Welle, German Radio, Russian State TV, Huffington Post among other international media channels. Locally in Kenya, Wadongo has been featured on KTN TV, K24 TV, NTV, KBC TV, Citizen TV, KISS FM Radio, Radio Jambo, Capital FM, Nation Newspaper, Standard Newspaper, The Star newspaper, The People newspaper, Parents Magazine, and Management Magazine.

Wadongo was named one of four torchbearers to represent Kenya during the 2012 London Olympics Torch Relay.

Wadongo has been a speaker in schools, colleges and international conferences in many countries in Europe, Americas, Middle East, and Africa, including the Global Entrepreneurship Summit, African Development Forum, Clinton Global Initiative-University, African Union Youth Forum, Education Without Borders, LSE Africa Summit, among others.

In August 2013, Wadongo was named by The Diplomatic Courier as a Top 99 under 33 Shaper, and on a list by MIT Technology Review of the Top 35 Innovators Under 35.
