= The International Institute for Justice and the Rule of Law =

International body

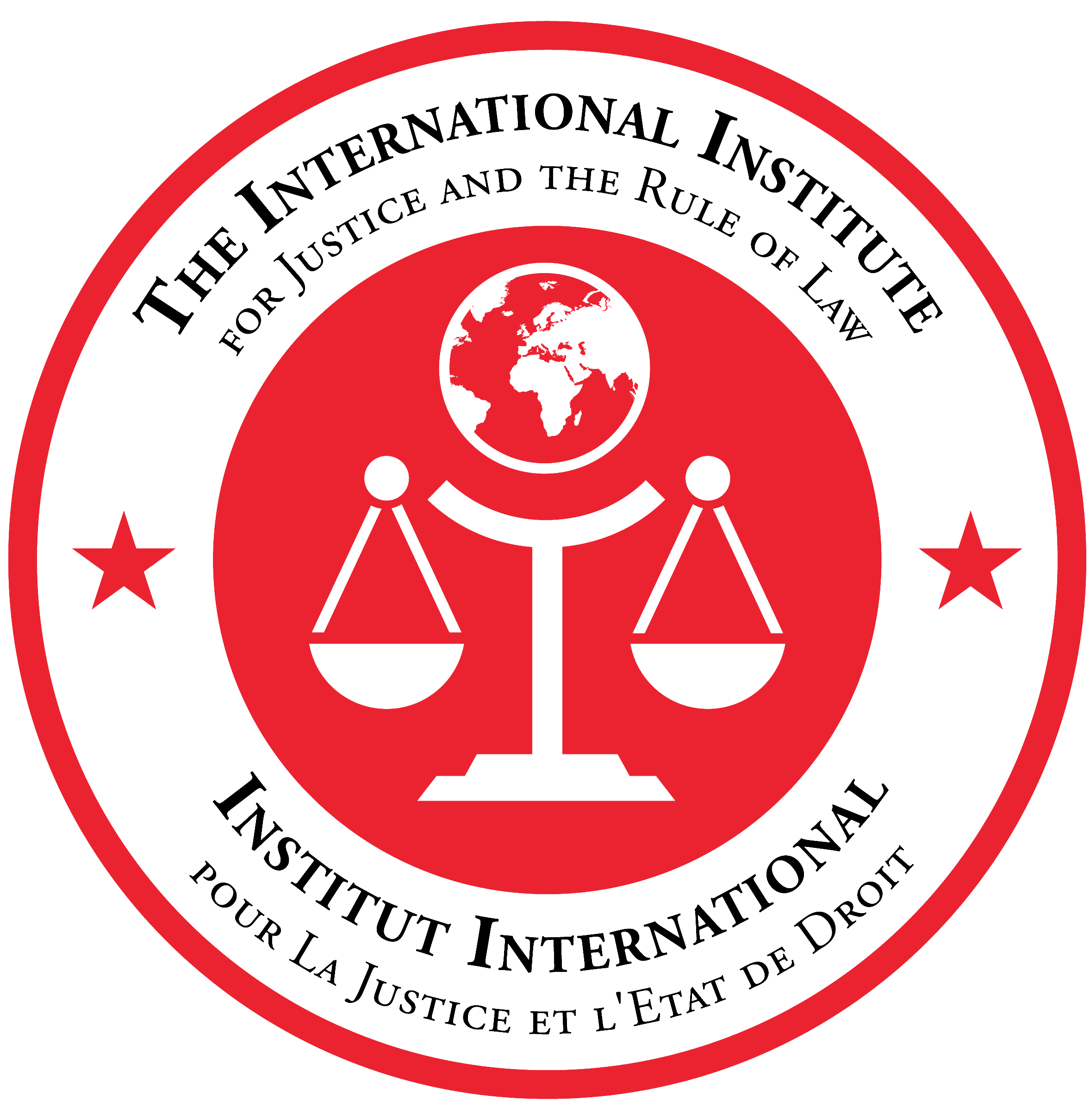
- Formation: June 18th, 2014
- Headquarters: Valletta, Malta
- President: Emeritus George
- Executive Secretary: Steven Hill
- Main organ: Governing Board of Administrators
- Affiliations: United Nations, Global Counterterrorism Forum
- Website: https://theiij.org/

The International Institute for Justice and the Rule of Law, also referred to as The IIJ or Malta Institute, is an International body that aims to improve governance within underdeveloped countries through efforts focused on counter-terrorism. The IIJ was founded in 2014 by twelve founding nations and is based in Valletta, Malta. It is often referred to as a Global Counterterrorism Forum-inspired institution. The founding nations include the United Kingdom, France, the United States, and the EU. It has also partnered with international federations such as the United Nations.

Since 2014, the IIJ has focused on improving rule of law within Africa and the Middle East. Its main objective is to train justice sector practitioners and also minimise terrorism in the regions.

== Structure ==
The International Institute for Justice and the Rule of Law is based out of Valletta, Malta. However, the Counter-Terrorism Organization has offices and events all around the world in places such as Argentina, Burkina Faso, Cote d'Ivorie, Kenya, Kuwait, Jordan, Ghana, Nigeria, Uganda, Indonesia, and the Philippines amongst others.

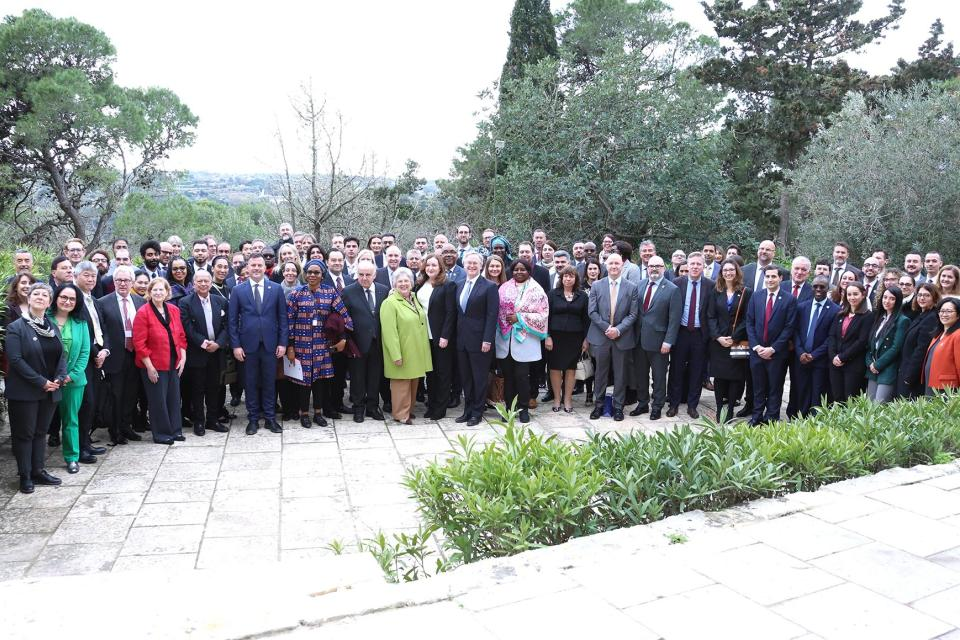
IIJ Staff Photo

The International Institute for Justice and the Rule of Law is led by the Executive Secretary who manages day-to-day operations with the support of the Director of Administration and Outreach, the Director of Programmes, and the Director of the Academic Unit. The IIJ staff currently consists of 38 members from 22 countries.

The Executive Secretary reports to the Governing Board of Administrators, which includes members from Algeria, France, Germany, Italy, Jordan, Kuwait, Malta, Morocco, Nigeria, Tunisia, Turkey, and the United Kingdom.

== History ==
In June 2014, it was announced that the International Institute for Justice and the Rule of Law (IIJ) would open in Valletta, Malta. The institute is closely supported by the Global Counterterrorism Forum and the United Nations. The IIJ was conceived during meetings by Ministers and senior officials of the Global Counterterrorism Forum, an organisation of about 40 countries from around the globe. It was founded by twelve founding member nations, with the help of institutions such as the EU and the United Nations. The nations included Algeria, France, Italy, Jordan, Malta, Morocco, the Netherlands, Nigeria, Tunisia, Turkey, United Kingdom, and the United States. The IIJ was referred to as a "Global Counterterrorism Forum inspired institution" at the time of its founding and is often compared to two similar institutions, Al Hidayah and GCERF.

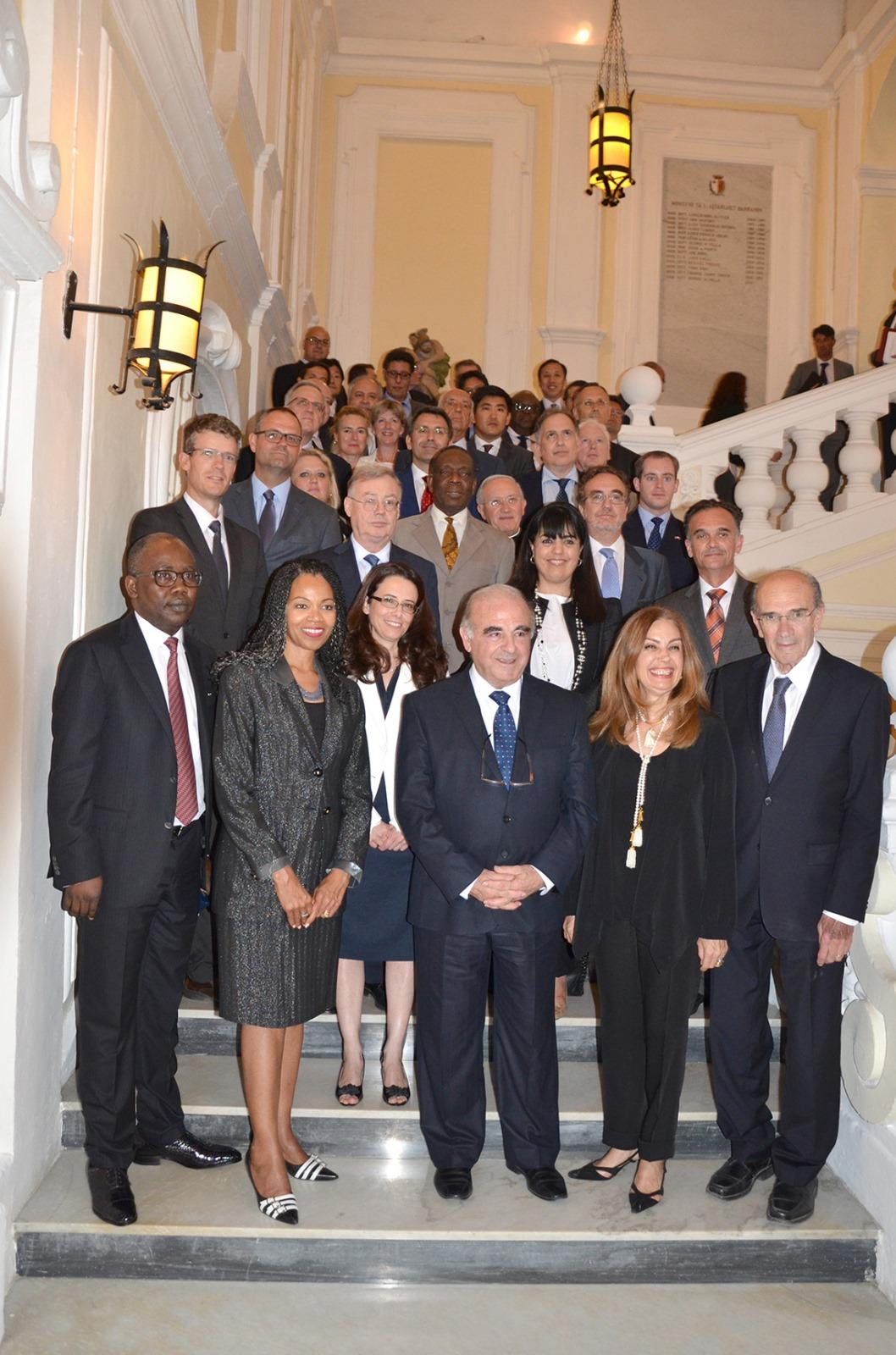
President Emeritus George Vella (front, centre) at Verdala Palace on June 14th, 2014.

At the meeting where the IIJ's foundation was announced, partners and representatives from founding member countries signed the Valletta Declaration on the International Institute for Justice and the Rule of Law Foundation. Some of the partners who signed the declaration included the International Centre for Counter-Terrorism (ICCT), the Global Center on Cooperative Security (GCCS), and the Institute for Security Studies (ISS).

While the IIJ undertakes a variety of roles, the majority of its programs are closely linked to counterterrorism. It aims to support lawmakers, police, prosecutors, judges, and similar personnel in addressing violent extremism and terrorism within their regions and borders. One such example is providing training on how counterterrorism laws can be implemented and how rule of law can promote and improve societies within certain regions by promoting justice, security and human rights. At its inception, the IIJ planned to play an influential role in supporting African and Middle Eastern countries that were in a period of transition.

After the Institution opened, it held its inaugural support and training session. The two-day event brought together prosecutors and investigators who discussed how to deal with terrorist cells in the Sahel and Maghreb. Their focus was determining how to stem the flow of foreign fighters joining ISIS' fight in Syria from the two African regions. Following the inaugural event, multiple workshops were scheduled, including the United Nations Office on Drugs and Crime (UNODC) work to establish legal cooperation between Libya and other North African countries to stem the funding of terrorism.

In late 2014, the University of Malta and the IIJ announced that they had signed a Memorandum of Understanding (MOU) to promote their aims to advance peace and security. The MOU began a collaboration between the two parties on research and training while mutually sharing their expertise.

By its second anniversary, over one thousand professionals, including lawmakers, police, and judges, had received training or support from the IIJ. This support continued their original strategy of addressing terrorism and minimising criminal activity.

The organization celebrated its 10-year anniversary at the Verdala Palace in Siġġiewi, Malta on February 2, 2024.

In January 2026, United States President Donald Trump announced that the United States would withdraw from the organization.

== Operations ==
Malta was chosen as the home for the Institute and the location of its training and support activities. Its geographical location is centralised to provide support between Europe, the Middle East, and Africa. While the twelve founding nations play a role in how the institute operates, the day-today operations are controlled by its Executive Secretary.

After the launch of the IIJ, the International Centre for Counter-Terrorism suggested in a press release that the focus of the IIJ would go beyond improving governance within regions associated with terrorism; it would also work to strengthen criminal justice systems and build regional judicial systems to improve local policing in areas of the world that had been previously neglected. In late 2014, the IIJ hosted a United Nations summit to discuss the role foreign terrorist fighters play in everyday society and what laws could be introduced.

The theme of IIJ's summits continued into 2015, when they held a roundtable meeting for lawmakers from North Africa, Europe, and the Middle East. The roundtable discussed how they could implement support for senior lawmakers and government officials in their respective regions. The policy was supported by the Counter-Terrorism Committee Executive Directorate (CTED). The project is implemented by the Global Center on Cooperative Security (Global Center) and the Institute for Security Studies (ISS).

The Valletta Recommendations Relating to Contributions by Parliamentarians in Developing an Effective Response to Terrorism was developed during IIJ workshops. The Maltese Home Affairs Minister Carmelo Abela then addressed a two-day workshop in early 2017 to discuss how terrorist groups such as ISIS needed to be stopped from spreading their propaganda on social media. Abela stated that he and the IIJ were working closely with Google, Facebook and Twitter on the matter.
