= Andrew Ajayi =

Anglican bishop of Nigeria

Andrew Olusola Ajayi is an Anglican bishop in Nigeria: born on July 2, 1959, he is the current Bishop of Ekiti Diocese. Translated from the Missionary Diocese of Ekiti Kwara, where he was the pioneer Bishop since May 26, 2008. He was elected and translated on July 2, 2022, on his 63rd birthday. He was enthroned 6th Bishop of Ekiti Diocese, Anglican Communion on August 13, 2022, at the Cathedral Church of Emmanuel. Okesha, Ado Ekiti. Rt. Rev. Andrew Olusola Ajayi Diploma in Theology of Emmanuel College of Theology, Ibadan, Nigeria. Diploma in Religious Studies of University of Ibadan, Nigeria. B. A. (Hons) Obafemi Awolowo University Ife, Master of Arts in Theology (New Testament), Master of Theology (STM) of Union Theological Seminary, New York City, USA. He is married to Mrs Abimbola Ajayi. They have children.

Rt Rev Andrew Ajayi is known for staunch Anglicanism and is passionate church development.
