= Global Community Engagement and Resilience Fund =

Swiss nonprofit organization

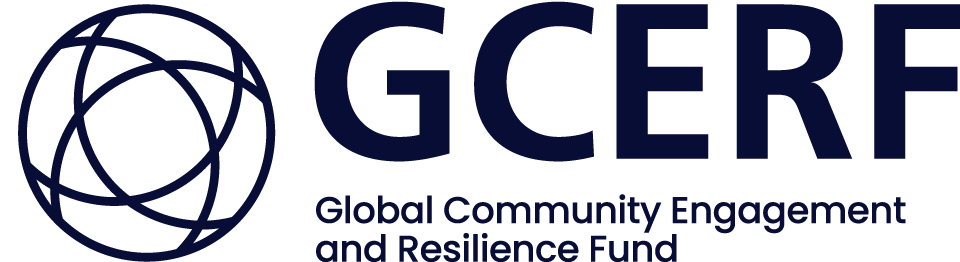
- Abbreviation: GCERF
- Formation: September 2014
- Legal status: Foundation
- Location(s): Geneva, Switzerland
- Official language: English
- Key people: Stefano Manservisi (Chair), Carol Bellamy (Former Chair), Dr. Khalid Koser (Executive Director)
- Website: www.gcerf.org

The Global Community Engagement and Resilience Fund (GCERF) is a nonprofit foundation based in Geneva, Switzerland. It is the first global effort to support local, community-level initiatives aimed at strengthening resilience against violent extremist agendas.

The Guardian described the organization as "The world’s first global counter-terrorism “bank”."

The foundation was announced by US Secretary of State John Kerry and Turkish Foreign Minister Ahmet Davutoğlu at the fourth Global Counterterrorism Forum Ministerial in New York, on 27 September 2013. On 9 September 2014, the foundation was officially established. The Swiss Federal Council signed a headquarters agreement with the GCERF on 26 May 2015.

From its founding in 2014 to 2024, the organization has received US$194,100,000 in contributions.

The United States withdrew from the organization in January 2026.

== Partner countries ==
Countries that have received assistance are:

- Albania
- Bangladesh
- Bosnia and Herzegovina
- Burkina Faso
- Chad
- Ghana
- Indonesia
- Iraq
- Kenya
- Kosovo
- Kyrgyzstan
- Mali
- Mauritania
- Mozambique
- Niger
- Nigeria
- North Macedonia
- Philippines
- Somalia
- Sri Lanka
- Syria
- Tunisia
- Yemen

== Donors ==
Donors include:

- Albania
- Australia
- Burkina Faso
- Canada
- Denmark
- European Union
- Finland
- France
- Germany
- Italy
- Japan
- Kenya
- Kofi Annan Foundation
- Kosovo
- Kuwait Danish Dairy Company
- Liechtenstein
- Luxembourg
- Morocco
- Netherlands
- New Zealand
- Niger
- Norway
- Qatar
- Spain
- Sweden
- Switzerland
- United Kingdom
- United States
