= Tunde Adegbola =

Nigerian linguist, engineer, and musician

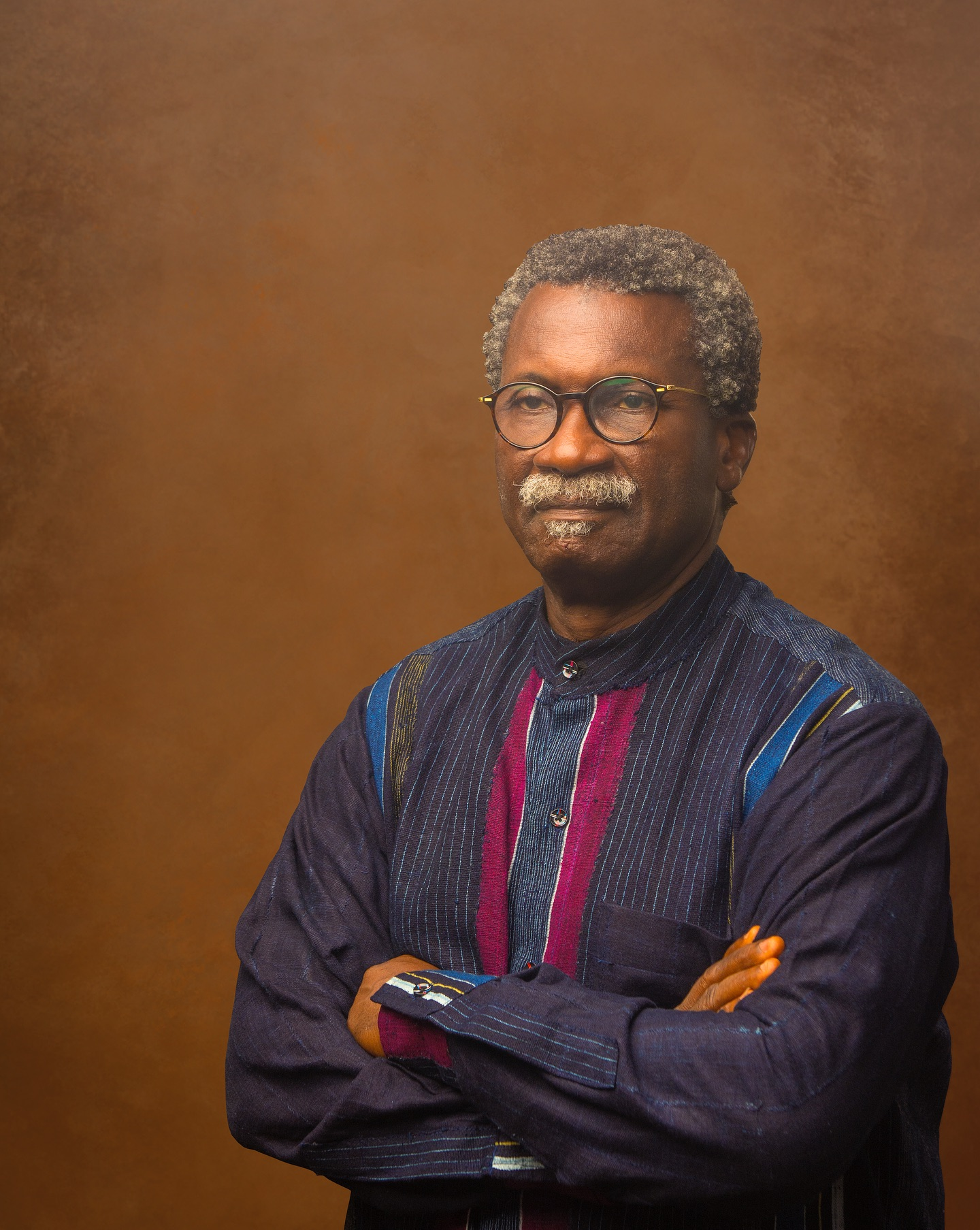
- Tunde Adegbola at 70 (2025)
- Born: Tunde Adegbola; 1 August 1955 (age 70); Ibadan, Nigeria
- Occupation: Language Technologist
- Website: www.alt-i.org

Tunde Adegbola (Yoruba: Túndé Adégbọlá; born 1 August 1955), also known as T. A. or Uncle T, is a Nigerian scientist, musician, engineer, linguist and culture activist. He is best known for his work in setting up most of the pioneering private television and radio stations in Nigeria. He is the founder of TIWA Systems and the executive director of Alt-i (African Languages Technology Initiative).

== Career ==
Tunde completed a bachelor's degree in electrical engineering at the University of Lagos, and later specialized in broadcast technology. He subsequently obtained a master's degree in computer science from the University of Wales (Swansea). He practiced for many years as a sound engineer, repairing musical instruments for a living. Afterwards, he completed a PhD in information science (with specialisation in human language technology) at the University of Ibadan. Tunde has been very influential in the broadcasting industry, particularly in Nigeria, where he set up many television stations and radio stations, as well as other African nations including São Tomé and Príncipe. His design and installation of broadcasting and production facilities for Africa Independent Television (AIT), Channels Television, Mainframe Film and Television Productions Studios, Media International Productions Studios, and Klink Studios are some of his most noteworthy projects. He was also the technical consultant to the Open Society Initiative for West Africa (OSIWA) that conceptualized, designed and built the West Africa Democracy Radio (WADR) as a hub of radio stations in West Africa. As a researcher in human language technology, he works in adapting information and communication technologies to make them usable in African languages. He partnered with Microsoft to localize Microsoft Windows and Office to Hausa, Igbo and Yoruba, the three most widely spoken Nigerian languages, beginning with Windows Vista. From Windows 8, the languages come bundled with the operating system.

He teaches artificial intelligence as an adjunct professor at the University of Lagos, University of Ibadan and Afe Babalola University, all in Nigeria.

He was a research fellow at Innovative Computing Inc (Quik Cat) of Cleveland, Ohio, United States, where he worked adapting psycho-acoustic principles for audio compression using cellular automata transform.

== Tiwa Systems ==
After a successful career of many years as a broadcast engineer in the Nigerian public service, Tunde set up TIWA Systems in 1985 with the aim of bringing the benefits of digital technology and its accompanying information revolution to Nigeria. Apart from providing consultancy and other services in both commercial and scientific computing, with TIWA, he pioneered desktop publishing in Nigeria by transforming the operations of such publishing houses as Spectrum Books, Evans Brothers, Onibonoje and many others between 1985 and 1990. He also pioneered nonlinear editing (NLE) of video and 3D animation in the Nigerian motion picture industry by installing the first personal animation recorder and NLE suits for production houses including Media International, Klink Studios, Mainframe Productions and Shell Production Nigeria and many others in the 1990s. These led to his various commissions for the design of most of the pioneering private TV stations in Nigeria, including Channels Television, MITV and Africa Independent Television (AIT), where he designed, supplied, installed and commissioned the stations between 1994 and 1997. He was the technical consultant to the Open Society Initiative for West Africa (OSIWA) for the design and implementation of West Africa Democracy Radio (WADR) between 2003 and 2006. He was also technical consultant to OSIWA on many other media projects, building and strengthening telecenters and community radio stations in more than five West African countries. In 2006, he undertook a consultancy for UNICEF to evaluate the national radio and television of São Tomé and Príncipe. He was later commissioned by International Alert, UNICEF and the United Nations Development Programme in 2007 to build two community radio stations in São Tomé and Príncipe.

== Alt-i ==
Tunde Adegbola started African Languages Technology Initiative (Alt-i) in 2002 for the purpose of developing the necessary resources that will facilitate the engagement of information and communication technology (ICT) in African languages. He is currently the director of Alt-i, which is located in Ibadan, Oyo State, Nigeria. Alt-i was set up to increase the relevance of technology in African languages. Alt-i is a nonprofit organization that is aimed at "inserting African issues into the agenda of the knowledge age" by addressing ICT as a possible factor of language endangerment. Alt-i is supported by various international grant making organisations, such as Bait Al-Hikmah, OSIWA, IDRC, and ACALAN. The only local source of funding so far has been the Lagos State Research and Development Council, which gave a grant to develop technology to help the unlettered take advantage of the increasing access to information through the web. Alt-i engages in research and development in the following areas:

- Automatic speech recognition
- Text-to-speech synthesis
- Machine translation
- Spell-checking
- Automatic diacritic application
- Localization of software
- Assistance to universities

== Yoruba keyboard ==
Adegbola developed a keyboard able to deal with the peculiarities of the orthography of Yoruba, which is a tonal language. Using the English keyboard layout for Yoruba could be quite difficult because various Yoruba words may be written with the same consonants and vowels, distinguished merely by the application of diacritical marks to indicate tones; thus it sometimes takes many keystrokes to realise a single Yoruba character when using the English keyboard layout. To accomplish the same result with fewer, more comfortable keystrokes, Tunde made a keyboard without the letters Q, Z, X, C and V, which Yoruba does not use (except for certain dialects, in which they use V, Z and the 'C' in the digraph 'ch'). He re-positioned the vowels, which are high-frequency, to more prominent spots and added tone marks and other symbols, creating a more appropriate Yoruba language keyboard layout. Now, he is working on speech recognition to convert spoken Yoruba into text.

== Personal life ==
Tunde was born on 1 August 1955. His father, the late Bishop Adeolu Adegbola, was tutored by missionaries and was one of the first in his hometown to receive formal Western education. Tunde Adegbola is married to Inyang (née Ndaeyo) from Nkari in Akwa Ibom State, Nigeria. They have three male children: Emem, Edidiong and Imoh.
