= Oluwaseun Osowobi =

Nigerian women's rights activist

Oluwaseun Ayodeji Osowobi
- Born: Lagos
- Education: Ahmadu Bello University
- Alma mater: Ahmadu Bello University, Swansea University
- Occupation: Women's rights activist.
- Organization: Stand to End Rape
- Awards: Genius Grant

Oluwaseun Ayodeji Osowobi is a Nigerian women's rights activist. She is the founder of the Stand to End Rape (STER) Initiative. In 2019 she was the second Nigerian woman to be named to Time 100 Next list, and she was the Commonwealth Young Person of the Year for that same year.

== Early life ==
Osowobi was born and raised in Nigeria, where she was inspired by her mother to become an advocate. She received a bachelor's degree in local government and development studies at Ahmadu Bello University before enrolling at Swansea University for a Master's degree in International Relations. Her thesis focused on gender equality and sex crimes against women and children.

== Career ==
During her mandatory National Youth Service, Osowobi worked for the Independent National Electoral Commission in the 2011 general elections. While working, she said, "the village and community members…set a trap for (her) to be raped by one of the village boys" after she refused a bribe. Afterwards, she founded Stand to End Rape (STER) in 2013. The initiative seeks to improve awareness of violence against women and provide support to victims of sexual assault. As of 2019, Time estimated the organization had reached around 200,000 Nigerians.

Osowobi was awarded a Genius Grant from the John D. and Catherine T. MacArthur Foundation in 2017. In 2019 she was named as one of Time 100 Next's people of the year, become on the second Nigerian women to make the list. She was also named as the Commonwealth Youth Person of the Year for 2019.

In 2020, Osowobi contracted COVID-19 while in the United Kingdom capital to attend on March 9 the Commonwealth Day Service. She recovered, and her detailing of her experience received media coverage.
