= Anglican Province of Kwara =

Anglican province in Nigeria

The Anglican Province of Kwara is one of the 14 ecclesiastical provinces of the Church of Nigeria. It comprises eight dioceses. The Archbishop of the Province of Kwara and Bishop of New Bussa is Israel Amoo.

The dioceses are (2021):

- Igbomina (Bishop: Emmanuel Adekola)
- Igbomina-West (Bishop: Olajide Adebayo)
- Jebba (Bishop: Oluwaseun A. Aderogba)
- Kwara (Bishop: S. T. G. Adewole; first bishop, Herbert Haruna, consecrated 27 October 1974, Ibadan)
- New Bussa (Bishop: Israel Amoo)
- Offa (Bishop: Solomon Akanbi)
- Omu-Aran (Bishop: Festus Oyetola Sobanke)
- Ekiti Kwara (Bishop: Andrew O.A. Ajayi)

== Archbishops of Kwara ==
- Until 2017 Michael Akinyemi
- 2017 - 2019 Olusegun Adeyemi
- 2019 - date Israel Amoo
