= Canadian Defence Academy =

Overall organization of learning institutes of the Canadian Armed Forces

The Canadian Defence Academy ("CDA") is an organization located within the Canadian Forces, created in 2000, officially opened in 2002. The academy is situated within the Military Personnel Command and headquartered at Canadian Forces Base Kingston, in Ontario.

The CDA comprises several professional military education institutes such as the Royal Military College of Canada, Canadian Forces College, the Royal Military College Saint-Jean; the Canadian Defence Academy Research Programme (CDARP) is a significant source of funding for research at these colleges for university teachers and groups in Engineering, Natural Sciences, Social Sciences and Humanities. The CDA is also responsible for the Canadian Military Journal, the Canadian Defence Academy Press and the Dallaire Centre of Excellence for Peace and Security. The CDA is commanded by Major-General Denis O'Reilly, who replaced Major-General Craig Aitchison on June 2nd, 2023.
