= Oluwaseun Aderogba =

Anglican bishop in Nigeria

Oluwaseun A. Aderogba is the Anglican Bishop of Jebba in Kwara Province of the Church of Nigeria.

He was elected Bishop of Jebba in January 2019, and consecrated in April 2019 at St David's Anglican Cathedral Church, Ijomu, Akure, by the Primate of All Nigeria, Nicholas Okoh. He was previously an archdeacon.
