= Oluwaseun Adegbola =

Nigerian footballer (born 1999)

Personal information
- Full name: Emmanuel Gbolahan Oluwaseun Adegbola
- Date of birth: 23 September 1999 (age 27)
- Place of birth: Ibadan, Nigeria
- Position: Defender

Youth career
- Perfect Touch Football Club

Senior career*
Years	Team	Apps	(Gls)
2020	Isloch Minsk Raion	4	(0)
2022	Enyimba		
- * Club domestic league appearances and goals as of 31 December 2020

Oluwaseun Adegbola (born 23 September 1999) is a Nigerian professional footballer.

== Early life ==
Oluwaseun Adegbola was born on 23 September 1999 in Ibadan, Nigeria. He is right-footed.

== Club career ==
In January 2020, Adegbola went on trial with Belarus club Isloch Minsk Raion. He played six friendly matches during the trial. After the trial, he signed a professional contract with the club. He joined Isloch from Perfect Touch Football Club.
