= Accession of the People's Republic of China to the United Nations =

The People's Republic of China (PRC, commonly known as China) was established in 1949 and was not recognized by the United Nations (UN) as the legitimate government of China until 1971. Prior to then, the Republic of China (commonly known as Taiwan) represented the interests of China, with both it and the PRC claiming to be the only legitimate representative of whole China. In 1950, the PRC requested its admission to the UN and the expulsion of the representatives of the Kuomintang (the former governing party of China) from the United Nations Security Council; the request was unsuccessful, after which the Soviet Union initiated a boycott of the UN. Following that, annual motions for the PRC's recognition were introduced by a variety of UN member states, until the PRC was formally recognized in October 1971.

== Background ==
The Republic of China was a founding member of the UN in 1945; members of the Chinese delegation were involved in the drafting of the Charter of the United Nations. China was granted a seat in the security council of the United Nations with veto powers with the support of U.S. President Franklin D. Roosevelt. At the time, Roosevelt attempted to counter the Soviet Union's influence in Asia with an ally of the United States. When the PRC was founded in 1949, and it requested to be recognized as the only legitimate representative of China before the United Nations, it was rejected and the ROC kept the seat in the United Nations. In the sources, the People's Republic of China (PRC) is also described as Communist China; and the Republic of China (ROC) is also known as Taiwan, Formosa, Nationalist China, and its diplomats to the UN as representatives of the Kuomintang or Chiang Kai-shek.

== 1949–1960 ==
After the PRC succeeded in the Chinese Civil War against the Chinese Nationalist forces, who withdrew to the island of Taiwan (formerly a Japanese colony in whom the ROC acquired in 1945), the PRC demanded to be seated in the United Nations Security Council. The first time was in November 1949, when Premier of the PRC Zhou Enlai wrote a letter to the UN. After the request to unseat the Chinese Nationalists and recognize the PRC was unsuccessful in the UN assembly, the Soviet Union raised the issue of China's representation in the Security Council of the UN the next month. By 8 January 1950 several countries, including Great Britain had recognized the PRC diplomatically and Enlai sent a second, somewhat more vigorous, request to unseat the Chinese Nationalists from the UN security council. This was followed by a formal request not to recognize the Chinese Nationalist credentials by the Soviet Union. But the United States and its western allies in the UN refused to recognize the PRC as the legitimate government of China as it would have granted a communist government a veto power in the United Nations Security Council.

Between 1951 and 1955, each year the Soviet Union requested for the admission of the PRC to the United Nations. Between 1956 and 1959 India requested for the PRC to be admitted to the United Nations. In 1960 it was the Soviet Union's turn again to demand PRC's UN membership. For each those years, the United States managed to keep the question of China's representation out of the agenda.

== 1961–1970 ==
The support of a change in representation grew to greater numbers and eventually the representation of China was discussed in 1961. The same year, a resolution was introduced with the support of the USA which considered the question of Chinese representation an 'important question', therefore requiring a majority of two-thirds. For the remainder of the decade, whether the PRC was to be seated and the ROC expelled was a matter of debate.

In 1961 and 1962 it was the Soviet Union who sponsored the draft resolution for the inclusion of the PRC into the UN. After Sino-Russian relations deteriorated, Albania proposed the annual question of Chinese representation in 1963. In 1964, no annual General Assembly was held. France recognized the PRC diplomatically in 1965, leaving the US as the only permanent member of the Security Council to support the Chinese Nationalist Government as the representative of China. In 1965 and 1966, several countries around Albania co-sponsored the request for the PRC to be seated in the UN. Between 1966 and 1968, an Italian initiative called for direct negotiations between the United Nations and the PRC on the issue of representation, but this was also not approved.

After the vote in 1969, the PRC government accused the Soviet Union of collaboration with the US in a plot with Chiang Kai-shek's 'bandit gang' to create Two Chinas. At the time, the United States were considering supporting a plan for China to be represented by the PRC in the UN and also its Security Council but for Taiwan to not be expelled from the UN. In 1970, it was the first time a majority of the General Assembly was in favor of seating the PRC in the UN, but it was not a majority of two-thirds.

== Recognitions by UN organizations ==
In the 26th General Assembly of the United Nations on 25 October 1971, the question of Chinese representation at the UN was not considered an important question anymore. In the same session, the Albanian-sponsored Resolution 2758 was approved, which meant the PRC was recognized as China's representation to the UN and the expulsion of the representatives of Chiang Kai-shek from all UN dependent institutions.

The next day, the secretary-general sent out a circular to the UN dependent agencies with the UN resolutions 2758 and 389 which dealt with questions of representation and informing that the position of the General Assembly of the United Nations should be taken into account also in the UN branches. The UNESCO, United Nations Conference on Trade and Development (UNCTAD) and the United Nations Development Program (UNDP) applied the UN resolution 2758 automatically. In other UN agencies further decisions were to be taken.

=== In 1971 ===
The International Labor Organizations (ILO) recognized the PRC as the Government of China on 16 November 1971, after a motion from the United States to defer the question on China's representation to the next ILO General Assembly was rejected. The International Civil Aviation Organization (ICAO) decided to recognize the representative of the PRC to the ICAO on 19 November 1971.

The Food and Agriculture Organization (FAO) invited the PRC to become a member state in November 1971 as the ROC withdrew from the FAO in 1951. The PRC eventually assumed its seat in 1973.

On request from the representative of Romania, the International Atomic Energy Agency (IAEA) decided to expel the representative of the Kuomintang and in turn to admit the representative of the PRC on the 9 December 1971.

=== In 1972 ===
The World Health Organization (WHO) decided to recognize the representative of the PRC as the representative of China on the 26 January 1972. And in February 1972, the World Meteorological Organization (WMO) also recognized the representative of the PRC as the representative from China.

== Aftermath ==
Further on, Taiwan aimed to become a member of the UN, which the PRC is opposed to. In a 1994 vote on whether the question should be on the UN agenda, the majority rejected the idea.
