= China and the United Nations =

People's Republic of China

United Nations membership
- Represented by: National Government of the Republic of China (1945–1948); Constitutional Government of the Republic of China (1948–1949); Constitutional Government of the Republic of China on Taiwan (1949–1971); Central People's Government of the People's Republic of China (1971–present)
- Membership: Full member
- Since: 24 October 1945
- UNSC seat: Permanent
- Permanent Representative: Fu Cong

The People's Republic of China is a member of the United Nations and one of five permanent members of its Security Council. The Republic of China (ROC) was one of the victorious Allies of World War II (the Chinese theatre of which was the Second Sino-Japanese War). It joined the UN as one of its founding member countries in 1945. The subsequent resumption of the Chinese Civil War between the government of Republic of China and the rebel forces of the Chinese Communist Party led to the latter's victory on the mainland and the establishment of the People's Republic of China (PRC) in 1949. Nearly all of mainland China was soon under its control, (Note: Tibet and the island of Hainan were acquired in 1950.) and the ROC government (then referred to in the West as "Nationalist China") retreated to the island of Taiwan.

The One-China policy advocated by both governments dismantled the solution of dual representation but, amid the Cold War and Korean War, the United States and its allies opposed the replacement of the ROC at the United Nations until 1971, although they were persuaded to pressure the government of the ROC to accept international recognition of Mongolia's independence in 1961. The PRC sought to be recognized by the United Nations from the 1950s, but the United States managed to keep the PRC out of the UN until 1971. The General Assembly Resolution 1668 which demanded a majority of two thirds for the recognition of new members was adopted in 1961. Canada and other allies of the United States individually shifted their recognitions of China to the PRC, which the US opposed. Some attempted to recognize both Chinas separately, which both Chinas opposed, each declaring itself the only legitimate representative of China. Annual motions to replace the ROC with the PRC were introduced first by the Soviet Union, then India and also Albania, but these were defeated.

Amid the Sino-Soviet split and Vietnam War, the current President of the United States at the time, Richard Nixon, entered into negotiations with Chinese Communist Party chairman Mao Zedong, initially through a secret 1971 trip undertaken by Henry Kissinger to visit Zhou Enlai. On 25 October 1971, a motion to recognize the People's Republic of China as the sole legal China, initiated by 17 UN members led by Albania, was passed as General Assembly Resolution 2758. It was supported by most of the communist states (including the Soviet Union) and non-aligned countries (such as India), but also by some NATO countries, such as the United Kingdom and Italy. After the PRC was seated on 15 November 1971, Nixon personally visited mainland China the next year, beginning the normalization of China–United States relations. The Republic of China maintained the view it was the sole legitimate representative of China until 1988, but eventually turned to a foreign policy which sought international recognition through a so-called checkbook diplomacy. These moves have been opposed and mostly blocked by the People's Republic of China, forcing the Republic of China to join international organizations under other names, including "Chinese Taipei" at the International Olympic Committee.

The Republic of China's most recent request for admission was turned down in 2007, but a number of European governments—led by the United States—protested to the UN's Office of Legal Affairs to force the global body and its secretary-general to stop using the reference "Taiwan is a part of China".

== Activity ==
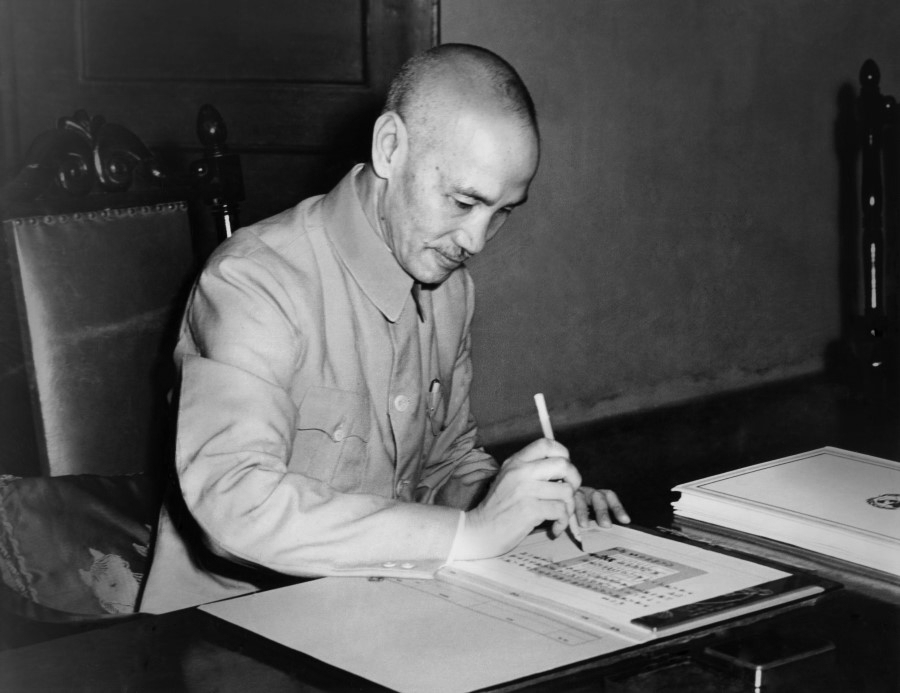
China was honored for its long struggle on the War of Resistance against Axis Power since Japanese aggression in Northeast China as the first signatory to affix the United Nations Charter on 24 August 1945. Generalissimo Chiang Kai-shek was the representative of the Republic of China.

The Government of the Republic of China (ROC) (now known as Taiwan) used its Security Council veto only once, to stop the admission of the Mongolian People's Republic to the United Nations in 1955 on the grounds it recognized all of Mongolia as a part of China.

The UN seat for "China" was originally occupied and represented by delegates of the Republic of China, and due to UN Resolution 2758, these delegates were expelled and replaced with delegates from the People's Republic of China on 25 October 1971. Since then, country became referred to as "Taiwan" by other countries the island covers 99% of the ROC-controlled territories.

As of September 2025, the People's Republic of China had used its Security Council veto twenty one times examples of prominent vetos include: in 1972 to veto the admission of Bangladesh (which it recognized as a province of Pakistan), in 1997 to veto ceasefire observers to Guatemala (which recognised the ROC as the legitimate government of China), in 1999 to veto an extension of observers to the Republic of Macedonia (same), in 2007 (in conjunction with Russia) to veto criticizing Myanmar (Burma) on its human rights record, in 2008 (with Russia) to veto sanctions against Zimbabwe, in 2011 (with Russia) to veto sanctions against Syria, and in February 2012 (with Russia) to veto for the second time a draft resolution calling for foreign military intervention in Syria.

The ROC co-founded the United Nations Relief and Rehabilitation Administration (UNRRA) in 1943 (prior to the establishment of UN). UNRRA provided supplies and services to areas under occupation by the Axis Powers. The largest project undertaken by UNRRA was the China program which had a total estimated cost of $658.4 million. UNRRA China Office was opened in Shanghai at the end of 1944, and operated until the official termination of the office on 31 December 1947. Final work and responsibilities were finished by March, 1948. UNRRA cooperated with Chinese National Relief and Rehabilitation Administration, led by Jiang Tingfu, to distribute relief supplies in China. UNRRA functions were later transferred to several UN agencies, including the International Refugee Organization and the World Health Organization.

Peng Chun Chang of ROC was the vice-chairman of the United Nations Commission on Human Rights that drafted the Universal Declaration of Human Rights. Eleanor Roosevelt, as the driving force behind the Declaration, recalled in her memoirs:

Dr. Chang was a pluralist and held forth in charming fashion on the proposition that there is more than one kind of ultimate reality. The Declaration, he said, should reflect more than simply Western ideas and Dr. Humphrey would have to be eclectic in his approach ... at one point Dr. Chang suggested that the Secretariat might well spend a few months studying the fundamentals of Confucianism!

The Universal Declaration of Human Rights was adopted by the UN General Assembly as Resolution 217 A(III) on 10 December 1948, as the result of the experience of the Second World War. The ROC was one of the 48 states that voted for it.

On 1 February 1951, after cease fire negotiations failed, United Nations General Assembly passed resolution 498 and called the intervention of the People's Republic of China in Korea an act of aggression.

As of June 2012, China had sent 3,362 military personnel to 13 UN peacekeeping operations in its first dispatch of military observers to the United Nations peacekeeping operations since military team to the Democratic Republic of the Congo. For 2013–2015, China ranked seventh among member states for contributing 3.93% of the United Nations Peacekeeping operations. By 2019, it was the tenth largest contributor but was providing more troops, police officers, and military observers than any other permanent member of the Security Council. As of 2022, it was providing roughly 20% of the UN peacekeeping standby force, more than all other Security Council members combined.

The International Criminal Court is a permanent tribunal to prosecute individuals for genocide, crimes against humanity, war crimes, and the crime of aggression. The court has jurisdiction if a situation is referred to the court by the United Nations Security Council. As of May 2013, 122 states have ratified or acceded to the Rome Statute that established the Court, but the PRC is not one of them. The PRC, as well its neighbouring rival India, has been critical of the court, as is the US which is also a non-signatory nation.

Since the mid-2010s, China has sought more leadership roles and policy influence in UN bodies. Chinese diplomats have held leadership roles in the Food and Agriculture Organization, Interpol, the International Civil Aviation Organization, the UN Industrial Development Organization, and the UN Department of Economic and Social Affairs.

China is active in its diplomacy with the International Telecommunications Union (ITU), the UN agency in charge of establishing common standards for telecommunications technologies. China is an active participant in the agency's work, is a significant donor, and Chinese experts have held leadership roles in the ITU. China seeks to obtain support in the ITU for China's internet protocol.

Institutional connections between China's Belt and Road Initiative and multiple UN bodies have also been established. These connections have been framed as supporting "connectivity," a concept that China emphasizes as central to development through infrastructure and international cooperation. UN Secretary General António Guterres has praised the BRI for its capacity to advance the UN's sustainable development goals.

In United Nations bodies, China argues for a way of looking at the concept of universal human rights that differs from the Western view. China's view is that a focus on political rights and values is a too narrow view of human rights, and should instead focus on economic outcomes, material well-being of people, and national sovereignty.

On 4 July 2024, China rejected Western human rights reform recommendations at a U.N. Human Rights Council session but accepted nearly 70% of suggestions from allies. Critics argue this acceptance rate is misleading due to lobbying efforts, while the U.S. and UK expressed disappointment, and Russia and Gambia praised China's approach.

Publishing in 2024, academic Sun Yi states that China has "played an increasingly dynamic role in energizing" the UN's Intangible Cultural Heritage Cooperation program.

=== Voting trends ===
China works hard to cultivate favorable votes from African countries at the United Nations.This pattern of alignment is linked to China's broader strategy of building political partnerships across the Global South.Through development financing and diplomatic engagement, China has strengthened its relationships with African countries, which in turn influences voting behavior with UN bodies. It has often been successful, and the voting pattern of the Africa countries which rotate on the Security Council and African members of the Human Rights Council generally align more frequently with China than with the United States, France, and the United Kingdom.

The General Assembly votes of African countries and China have also generally aligned. As part of China's view of South-South cooperation, it often seeks to base its UN voting behavior on the positions of regional groupings in the global South like the Arab League or the African Union. Where there are differences among African countries, China generally encourages those countries to reach a regional consensus.

Within the United Nations Security Council, China is generally aligned with the other permanent members. From 1991 to 2020, its disagreements with the United States have primarily come over issues related to the Middle East and sub-Saharan Africa, with those disagreements increasing over time. These areas of increasing disagreement often involve the Palestinian-Israeli conflict and matters of state sovereignty, as discussed below.

Before its entry to the UN, China viewed UN peacekeeping missions negatively, regarding them as an attempt to infringe on countries' sovereignty. After its UN entry, China's opposition to such missions was generally verbal, rather than reflected in its votes; it chose not to participate in such decisions rather than actively using its votes against them.

Thus, China rarely used its veto power before 2011. It instead used abstention to avoid express disapproval without directly confronting its fellow permanent members. Also prior to 2011, China was increasingly open to the concept of responsibility to protect, especially in relation to Sudan and Darfur.

These trends began to change following the Arab awakening and the NATO invasion of Libya in 2011. China voted yes on UNSCR 1970 to refer Muammar Gaddafi to the International Criminal Court, but abstained on UNSCR 1973, which established a no-fly zone and authorized sanctions against Libya. Shortly after the vote, NATO invaded Libya, resulting in the overthrow of Gaddafi, his public execution, a civil war that continues through 2022. China has since "held up Libya as an example of the United States and the rest of the West using humanitarian concerns to justify aggression and regime change by force." Its views on territorial sovereignty have thus hardened since 2011. Thus, for example, between 2010 and 2020 China vetoed ten resolutions regarding Syria and takes a more vocal position in the UN regarding matters of sovereignty.

From 1991 to 2020, the vast majority of China's abstentions and all of its vetoes have occurred on issues that involve territorial integrity, primarily sanctions and the jurisdiction of the International Criminal Court. In her analysis of China's security council voting behavior, Professor Dawn C. Murphy concludes, "These votes directly correspond to China's promotion of the Five Principles, especially the principles of mutual respect for territory and sovereignty and mutual noninterference in the internal affairs of other states."

China consistently opposes sanctions, although there have been some exceptions. For example, in addition to the Libyan sanctions discussed above, China voted in favor of sanctioning North Korea in 2006 for its nuclear program. China has also voted yes on seven sanctions votes against Iran in relation to its developing nuclear program. Its atypical votes regarding Iran may arguably be explained by a desire not to confront the United States on a matter that the United States believes to be a vital national interest.

== History ==
=== Republic of China in the United Nations (1945–1971) ===
Republic of China

United Nations membership
- Membership: Former full member
- Dates: 24 October 1945 – 15 November 1971
- UNSC seat: Permanent
- Permanent Representatives: Guo Taiqi (first); Tsiang Tingfu; Liu Chieh (last)

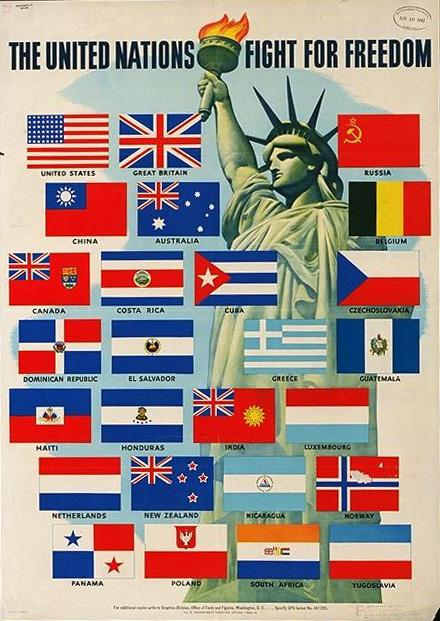
First UN poster, 1942. The flags of the wartime "big four" come first, then the others in alphabetical order.

The Republic of China (ROC) was a charter member of the United Nations and one of five permanent members of the Security Council until 1971. The ROC joined the United Nations as a founding member on 24 October 1945.

The "Big Four" victors of World War II (Nationalist China, the Soviet Union, the United Kingdom, and the United States) were the founding members of the United Nations that drafted the United Nations Charter in 1944, which was ratified on 26 June 1945 by the representatives of 50 countries. China, in recognition of its long-standing fight against aggression, was accorded the honor of being the first to sign the UN Charter. President Franklin Roosevelt had acknowledged China's war effort in World War II and stated his desire to allow China to "play its proper role in maintaining peace and prosperity" in the world. Thus, despite opposition from other leaders, especially Winston Churchill, China became a permanent member of the Security Council from its creation in 1945.

In 1949, the Chinese Communist Party (CCP) won the Chinese Civil War in mainland China and established the People's Republic of China (PRC), claiming to be the sole legitimate government of China. The ROC government retreated to the island of Taiwan (which it gained control of in 1945 at the end of hostilities in WWII), Quemoy Island, and the Matsu Islands. The ROC legally claimed to be the sole legitimate government of China until 1988, and during the 1950s and 1960s this claim was accepted by the United States and most of its allies. While the PRC was an ally of the Soviet Union, the United States sought to prevent the Communist bloc from gaining another permanent seat in the Security Council. To protest the exclusion of the PRC, Soviet representatives boycotted the UN from January to August 1950. The Soviet UN ambassador Yakov Malik threatened the Soviets would not feel bound by UN decisions taken in presence of representatives of the Kuomintang the Government of the ROC. The boycott led to the Soviets not being able to veto the UN resolution which allowed an intervention of UN military forces in Korea.

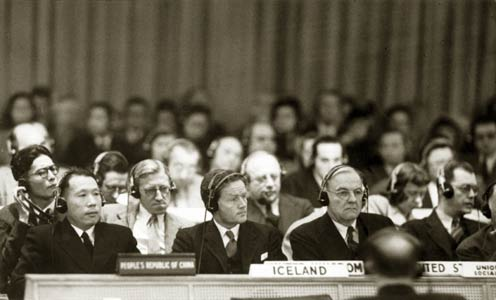
In November 1950, Wu Xiuquan (first from the left in the front row), representing the People's Republic of China spoke at the UN Security Council.

The ROC complained to the UN against the Soviet Union for violating the Sino-Soviet Treaty of Friendship and Alliance and the United Nations Charter in 1949; as a result, the United Nations General Assembly passed Resolution 291 and 292, referring the complaint "to the Interim Committee of the General Assembly for continuous examination and study". In 1952, the United Nations General Assembly found that the Soviet Union prevented the National Government of the ROC from re-establishing Chinese authority in Manchuria after Japan surrendered, and gave military and economic aid to the CCP, who founded the PRC in 1949, against the National Government of the ROC. Resolution 505 was passed to condemn the Soviet Union with 25 countries supporting, 9 countries opposing, 24 countries abstaining, and 2 countries non-voting. The resolution also affirmed the ROC as the "Central Government of China".

The ROC used its veto only once. Recognition of the Soviets' violation of their friendship treaty abrogated its recognition of Mongolia's independence. It therefore vetoed its admission into the United Nations on 13 December 1955, claiming it—as Outer Mongolia—to be an integral part of China. Mongolia's application had been tabled at the UN on 24 June 1946, but had been blocked by Western countries, as part of a protracted Cold War dispute about the admission of new members to the UN. The General Assembly, by Resolution 918 (X) of 8 December 1955, had recommended to the Security Council that this dispute should be ended by the admission, in a single resolution, of a list of eighteen countries. On 14 December 1955, the Security Council adopted a compromise proposed by the Soviet Union, and the General Assembly, by Resolution 995 (X), admitted sixteen countries into UN, omitting Mongolia and Japan from the list. This postponed the admission of Mongolia until 1961, when the Soviet Union agreed to lift its veto on the admission of Mauritania, in return for the admission of Mongolia. Faced with pressure from nearly all the other African countries, the ROC relented under protest. Mongolia and Mauritania were both admitted to the UN on 27 October 1961. The same year, United Nations General Assembly Resolution 1668 made China's representation an "important question" requiring a two-thirds majority vote to alter.

The 1954 Nobel Peace Prize was awarded to the United Nations High Commissioner for Refugees (UNHCR). The Nobel Foundation noted that UNHCR, among other contributions, was asked by the UN General Assembly (Resolution 1167 and 1784), in 1957 and again in 1962, to assist Chinese refugees in Hong Kong whose numbers are estimated at over one million. UNHCR assistance was also given to needy refugees among the Chinese refugees in Macao, and the Tibetan refugees in India and Nepal. India hosted some 110,000 Tibetan refugees as of the end of 2001. UNHCR estimates that there are 15,000 Tibetans who arrived in Nepal prior to 1990 and were recognized by the Government as refugees.

From the 1960s onwards, nations friendly to the PRC, led by the People's Republic of Albania under Enver Hoxha, moved an annual resolution in the General Assembly to expel the "representatives of Chiang Kai-shek" (an implicit reference to the ROC) and permit the PRC to represent China at the UN. Every year the United States was able to assemble enough votes to block this resolution. Both sides rejected compromise proposals to allow both states to participate in the UN, based on the One-China policy.

On 29 September 1960, Nepali PM BP Koirala proposed UN general assembly to make PRC a member of UN:

In our opinion, the United Nations can neither become universal nor can it reflect the political realities existing in the world today until the People's Republic of China is given its rightful place in the organization. The United Nations will not be able to fulfill effectively some of its most important purposes and functions until the People's Republic of China is brought in.

The admission of newly independent developing nations in the 1960s gradually turned the General Assembly from being Western-dominated to being dominated by countries sympathetic to the PRC. Not only the newly founded developing countries, but also most of the Western countries eventually decided to recognise the PRC. During the 1950s and 1960s, United Kingdom, Switzerland, Sweden, and France shifted their recognition of China from the ROC to the PRC. In the early 1970s, Canada, Turkey, and more western countries established diplomatic relations with the PRC, and severed diplomatic relations with the ROC.

In a Security Council meeting on 9 February 1971, Somalia objected to the credentials of the representative of Republic of China as the representative occupying the United Nations seat for China, and ROC and the United States responded that the question of China's representation should not be dealt with in the Security Council.

On 15 July 1971, 17 UN members requested that a question of the "Restoration of the lawful rights of the People's Republic of China in the United Nations" be placed on the provisional agenda of the twenty-sixth session of the UN General Assembly, claiming that the PRC, a "founding member of the United Nations and a permanent member of the Security Council, had since 1949 been refused by systematic manoeuvres the right to occupy the seat to which it is entitled ipso jure". On 25 September 1971, a draft resolution, A/L.630 and Add.l and 2, was submitted by 23 states including 17 of the states which had joined in placing the question on the agenda, to "restore to the People's Republic of China all its rights and expel forthwith the representatives of Chiang Kai-shek." On 29 September 1971, another draft resolution, A/L.632 and Add.l and 2, sponsored by 22 members, was proposed declaring that any proposal to deprive the Republic of China of representation was an important question under Article 18 of the UN Charter, and thus would require a two-thirds supermajority for approval. A/L.632 and Add.l and 2 was rejected on 25 October 1971 by a vote of 59 to 55, with 15 abstentions.

Saudi Arabia submitted a proposition allowing the ROC to retain its seat at the UN and its affiliated organizations "until the people of the Island of Taiwan are enabled by a referendum or a plebiscite" under the auspices of the UN to choose among three options: continued independence as a sovereign state with a neutral status defined by a treaty recorded by the UN; a confederation with the PRC; or a federation with the PRC, but was not supported by the United States.

Seeking to place more diplomatic pressure on the Soviet Union, United States president Richard Nixon sent his national security advisor Henry Kissinger on two trips to the People's Republic of China in July and October 1971 (the first of which was made in secret via Pakistan) to confer with Premier Zhou Enlai, then in charge of Chinese foreign policy. His trips paved the way for the groundbreaking 1972 summit between Nixon, Zhou, and CCP Chairman Mao Zedong, ending 23 years of diplomatic isolation and mutual hostility in favour of a tacit strategic anti-Soviet alliance between China and the United States, though the United States did not grant formal diplomatic recognition to the PRC until 1 January 1979.

On 25 October 1971, the United States moved that a separate vote be taken on the provisions in the resolution "to expel forthwith the representatives of Chiang Kai-shek from the place which they unlawfully occupied at the United Nations and in all the organizations related to it" in the draft resolution. By this the United States was proposing that while the credentials of the PRC representatives would be accepted and the PRC would be seated as China's representative with a seat on the Security Council, the ROC would continue to enjoy representation in the General Assembly. The proposition was legally untenable. Being China a founding member, the ROC had been a member of the United Nations; the presence of its representatives at the UN having always been predicated on its claim to represent China. The motion was rejected by a vote of 61 to 51, with 16 abstentions. The representative of ROC made a declaration that the rejection of the 22-power draft resolution calling for a two-thirds majority was a flagrant violation of the United Nations Charter which governed the expulsion of Member States and that the delegation of the Republic of China had decided not to take part in any further proceedings of the General Assembly. With the support from 26 African UN Member States and in accordance with Article 18 of the UN Charter, the Assembly then adopted Resolution 2758, with 76 countries supporting, 35 countries opposing, 17 countries abstaining, and 3 countries non-voting, withdrawing recognition of the representatives of Chiang Kai-shek as the legitimate representative of China, and recognizing the Government of PRC as the only legitimate representative of China to the United Nations. At a Security Council meeting on 23 November 1971, after the General Assembly passed Resolution 2758, the President of the council and the other representatives made statements welcoming the representatives of the People's Republic of China. The ROC lost not only its Security Council seat, but any representation in the UN.

Voting records of the United Nations General Assembly Resolutions 505 and 2758

Voting records of the United Nations General Assembly Resolutions 505 and 2758
| Member state | Resolution 505 | Resolution 2758 |
|---|---|---|
| Afghanistan | Abstention | Yes |
| Albania | Not member state yet | Yes |
| Algeria | Not member state yet | Yes |
| Argentina | Abstention | Abstention |
| Australia | Abstention | No |
| Austria | Not member state yet | Yes |
| Bahrain | Not member state yet | Abstention |
| Barbados | Not member state yet | Abstention |
| Belgium | Abstention | Yes |
| Bhuttan | Not member state yet | Yes |
| Bolivia | Yes | No |
| Botswana | Not member state yet | Yes |
| Brazil | Yes | No |
| Bulgaria | Not member state yet | Yes |
| Burma | No | Yes |
| Burundi | Not member state yet | Yes |
| Byelorussian SSR | No | Yes |
| Cameroon | Not member state yet | Yes |
| Canada | Abstention | Yes |
| Central African Republic | Not member state yet | No |
| Ceylon | Not member state yet | Yes |
| Chad | Not member state yet | No |
| Chile | Yes | Yes |
| China | Yes | Non-voting |
| Colombia | Yes | Abstention |
| Congo (Brazzaville) | Not member state yet | Yes |
| Congo (Leopoldville) | Not member state yet | No |
| Costa Rica | Yes | No |
| (Republic of Cuba (1902–1959)) Cuba | Yes | Yes |
| Cyprus | Not member state yet | Abstention |
| Czechoslovakia | No | Yes |
| Dahomey | Not member state yet | No |
| Denmark | Abstention | Yes |
| Dominican Republic | Yes | No |
| Ecuador | Yes | Yes |
| Egypt | Abstention | Yes |
| El Salvador | Non-voting | No |
| Equatorial Guinea | Not member state yet | Yes |
| Ethiopia | Abstention | Yes |
| Fiji | Not member state yet | Abstention |
| Finland | Not member state yet | Yes |
| France | Abstention | Yes |
| Gabon | Not member state yet | No |
| Gambia | Not member state yet | No |
| Ghana | Not member state yet | Yes |
| Greece | Yes | Abstention |
| Guatemala | Abstention | No |
| Guinea | Not member state yet | Yes |
| Guyana | Not member state yet | Yes |
| Haiti | Yes | No |
| Honduras | Yes | No |
| Hungary | Not member state yet | Yes |
| Iceland | Abstention | Yes |
| India | No | Yes |
| Indonesia | No | Abstention |
| Iran | Abstention | Yes |
| Iraq | Yes | Yes |
| Ireland | Not member state yet | Yes |
| Israel | No | Yes |
| Italy | Not member state yet | Yes |
| Ivory Coast | Not member state yet | No |
| Jamaica | Not member state yet | Abstention |
| Japan | Not member state yet | No |
| Jordan | Not member state yet | Abstention |
| Kenya | Not member state yet | Yes |
| Khmer Republic | Not member state yet | No |
| Kuwait | Not member state yet | Yes |
| Laos | Not member state yet | Yes |
| Lebanon | Yes | Abstention |
| Lesotho | Not member state yet | No |
| Liberia | Yes | No |
| Libyan Arab Republic | Not member state yet | Yes |
| Luxembourg | Abstention | Abstention |
| Madagascar | Not member state yet | No |
| Malawi | Not member state yet | No |
| Malaysia | Not member state yet | Yes |
| Maldives | Not member state yet | Non-voting |
| Mali | Not member state yet | Yes |
| Malta | Not member state yet | No |
| Mauritania | Not member state yet | Yes |
| Mauritius | Not member state yet | Abstention |
| Mexico | Abstention | Yes |
| Mongolia | Not member state yet | Yes |
| Morocco | Not member state yet | Yes |
| Nepal | Not member state yet | Yes |
| Netherlands | Abstention | Yes |
| New Zealand | Abstention | No |
| Nicaragua | Yes | No |
| Niger | Not member state yet | No |
| Nigeria | Not member state yet | Yes |
| Norway | Abstention | Yes |
| Oman | Not member state yet | Non-voting |
| Pakistan | Abstention | Yes |
| Panama | Yes | Abstention |
| Paraguay | Yes | No |
| Peru | Yes | Yes |
| Philippines | Yes | No |
| Poland | No | Yes |
| Portugal | Not member state yet | Yes |
| Qatar | Not member state yet | Abstention |
| Romania | Not member state yet | Yes |
| Rwanda | Not member state yet | Yes |
| Saudi Arabia | Abstention | No |
| Senegal | Not member state yet | Yes |
| Sierra Leone | Not member state yet | Yes |
| Singapore | Not member state yet | Yes |
| Somalia | Not member state yet | Yes |
| South Africa | Non-voting | No |
| Soviet Union | No | Yes |
| Spain | Not member state yet | Abstention |
| Sudan | Not member state yet | Yes |
| Swaziland | Not member state yet | No |
| Sweden | Abstention | Yes |
| Syrian Arab Republic | Abstention | Yes |
| Thailand | Yes | Abstention |
| Togo | Not member state yet | Yes |
| Trinidad and Tobago | Not member state yet | Yes |
| Tunisia | Not member state yet | Yes |
| Turkey | Yes | Yes |
| Uganda | Not member state yet | Yes |
| Ukrainian SSR | No | Yes |
| United Kingdom | Abstention | Yes |
| United Republic of Tanzania | Not member state yet | Yes |
| United States | Yes | No |
| Upper Volta | Not member state yet | No |
| Uruguay | Yes | No |
| Venezuela | Yes | No |
| Yemen | Abstention | Yes |
| Democratic Yemen | Not member state yet | Yes |
| Yugoslavia | Abstention | Yes |
| Zambia | Not member state yet | Yes |

==== Efforts to reintroduce the ROC to the UN ====
Following the adoption of Resolution 2758, the Republic of China was no longer represented by a Permanent Representative at the UN. UN Secretary-General U Thant sent a message to the PRC government asking him to send a delegation to Security Council soon. In addition to losing its seat in the UN, the UN Secretary-General concluded from the resolution that the General Assembly considered Taiwan to be a province of China, and thus it does not permit the ROC to become a party to treaties for which it is the depository.

In 1993 the ROC began campaigning to rejoin the UN separately from the People's Republic of China. A number of options were considered, including seeking membership in the specialized agencies, applying for observer status, applying for full membership, or having resolution 2758 revoked to reclaim the seat of China in the UN.

Taiwan's attempts were unsuccessful as the General Assembly's General Committee declined to put the issue on the Assembly's agenda for debate, under strong opposition from the PRC.

While all these proposals were vague, requesting the ROC be allowed to participate in UN activities without specifying any legal mechanism, in 2007 President Chen Shui-bian submitted a formal application under the name "Taiwan" for full membership in the UN. On 15 September 2007, over 3,000 Taiwanese Americans and their supporters rallied in front of the UN building in New York City, and over 300,000 Taiwanese people rallied in Taiwan, all in support of the ROC joining the UN. The ROC also won the backing of many Members of the European Parliament on this issue. However, the application was rejected by the United Nations Office of Legal Affairs citing General Assembly Resolution 2758, without being forwarded to the Security Council. Secretary-General of the United Nations Ban Ki-moon stated that:

The position of the United Nations is that the People's Republic of China is representing the whole of China as the sole and legitimate representative Government of China. The decision until now about the wish of the people in Taiwan to join the United Nations has been decided on that basis. The resolution (General Assembly Resolution 2758) that you just mentioned is clearly mentioning that the Government of China is the sole and legitimate Government and the position of the United Nations is that Taiwan is part of China.

Responding to the UN's rejection of its application, the ROC government has stated that Taiwan is not now nor has it ever been under the jurisdiction of the PRC, and that since General Assembly Resolution 2758 did not clarify the issue of Taiwan's representation in the UN, it does not prevent Taiwan's participation in the UN as an independent sovereign nation. The ROC argued that Resolution 2758 merely transferred the UN seat from the ROC to the PRC, but did not address the issue of Taiwan's representation in the UN. The ROC government also criticized Ban for asserting that Taiwan is part of China and returning the application without passing it to the Security Council or the General Assembly, contrary to UN's standard procedure (Provisional Rules of Procedure of the Security Council, Chapter X, Rule 59). The ROC emphasized that the United Nations has never taken a formal stance regarding the sovereignty of Taiwan. On the other hand, the PRC government, which has stated that Taiwan is part of China and firmly opposes the application of any Taiwan authorities to join the UN either as a member or an observer, praised that UN's decision "was made in accordance with the UN Charter and Resolution 2758 of the UN General Assembly, and showed the UN and its member states' universal adherence to the one-China principle". A group of UN member states put forward a draft resolution for that autumn's UN General Assembly calling on the Security Council to consider the application.

Ban Ki-moon also came under fire for this statement from the United States via non-official channels. There are unconfirmed reports that Ban's comments prompted the US to restate its position regarding the status of Taiwan. A Heritage Foundation article suggests that the US may have presented a démarche stating among others that:

If the UN Secretariat insists on describing Taiwan as a part of the PRC, or on using nomenclature for Taiwan that implies such status, the United States will be obliged to disassociate itself on a national basis from such position."

The Wall Street Journal criticized Ban Ki-moon for rejecting the ROC's July 2007 application and regarded Ban's interpretation of Resolution 2758 (that Taiwan was part of China) as erroneous. Nevertheless, Secretary General Ban Ki-Moon's statement reflected long-standing UN convention to deny the ROC representation and is mirrored in other documents promulgated by the United Nations. For example, the UN's "Final Clauses of Multilateral Treaties, Handbook", 2003 (a publication which predated his tenure in Office) states:

[r]egarding the Taiwan Province of China, the Secretary-General follows the General Assembly's guidance incorporated in resolution 2758 (XXVI)of the General Assembly of 25 October 1971 on the restoration of the lawful rights of the People's Republic of China in the United Nations. The General Assembly decided to recognize the representatives of the Government of the People's Republic of China as the only legitimate representatives of China to the United Nations. Hence, instruments received from the Taiwan Province of China will not be accepted by the Secretary-General in his capacity as depositary.

In 2008, two referendums by the ROC on joining the UN failed because of low voter participation. That autumn the ROC took a new approach, with its allies submitting a resolution requesting that the "Republic of China (Taiwan)" be allowed to have "meaningful participation" in the UN specialized agencies. Again the issue was not put on the Assembly's agenda when the United Nations subcommittee ruled it would not let the General Assembly consider the ROC's application to join UN activities. Shortly after this, the United States and the national governments of the European Union expressed their support for "Taiwan" (none of them recognises the ROC) to have "meaningful participation" in UN specialized agencies, such as the World Health Organization. In May 2009, the Department of Health of the Republic of China was invited by the World Health Organization to attend the 62nd World Health Assembly as an observer under the name "Chinese Taipei". This was the ROC's first participation in an event organized by a UN-affiliated agency since 1971, as a result of the improved cross-strait relations since Ma Ying-jeou became the President of the Republic of China a year before.

In 2009, the ROC chose not to bring the issue of its participation in the UN up for debate at the General Assembly for the first time since it began the campaign in 1993.

A 2013 United States congressional report describes US bipartisan "One China" policy as follows:

The United States has its own "one China" policy (vs. the PRC's "one China" principle) and position on Taiwan's status. Not recognizing the PRC's claim over Taiwan nor Taiwan as a sovereign state, United States policy has considered Taiwan's status as unsettled.

Since Tsai Ing-wen took office in 2016, there are growing number of renewed attempts to join the United Nations in its own right under the name "Taiwan" but this was prevented by the PRC. During the Biden Administration, United States Secretary of State Antony Blinken supported Taiwan's participation in the UN in 2021, the 50th anniversary of the ROC's membership replaced with the PRC at the United Nations. Similar attempts to join the World Health Organization in 2023 were rebuffed.

=== People's Republic of China in the United Nations (since 1971) ===
Voting situation in the UN general assembly respect to resolution 2758 (1971). Voted in favor Voted against Abstained Non-voting member Non-UN members/dependencies

The People's Republic of China (PRC), commonly called China today, was admitted into the UN in 1971 on the 21st time of voting on its application. The PRC was admitted into the UN on a vote of 76 in favor, 35 opposed, and 17 abstentions. In a letter to the United Nations on September 29, 1972, the PRC asserted that it had no obligation to honor multilateral treaties that may have been ratified by the Republic of China under the governance of Chiang Kai-shek, including the International Covenant on Civil and Political Rights (ICCPR) and the International Covenant on Economic, Social and Cultural Rights (ICESCR) adopted by the UN General Assembly in 1966, though the PRC in 1971 affirmed acceptance of the 1948 Universal Declaration of Human Rights (UDHR) by virtue of simply becoming UN members.

In its initial years following admission in 1971, the People's Republic of China maintained a relatively cautious and restrained presence with the United Nations. It often avoided taking clear positions in Security Council decisions and at times chose not to vote while still being present. This approach allowed China to signal its dissatisfaction with aspects of the existing international order without directly obstructing UN proceedings.

In the 1960s and early 1970s that the United States' close ally, Pakistan, especially under the presidency of Ayub Khan, was carrying out messenger diplomacy to the PRC's entry into the UN by the United States' diplomacy to People's Republic of China in the time of Sino-Soviet split. This involved secret visits by United States officials to the PRC. In 1971, Henry Kissinger made a secret visit to the PRC through Pakistan.

In 1974, China announced its Three Worlds Theory at the UN. China's presentation of the Three Worlds Theory framed its role as part of the developing world and emphasized solidarity with countries in Asia, Africa, and Latin America. This positioning was consistent with China's broader approach to international development, which describes its role as a "partner, rather than a donor," and emphasizes "mutual help among developing countries" rather than traditional hierarchical aid relationships.

Since the early 1980s, and particularly since 1989, by means of vigorous monitoring and the strict maintenance of standards, United Nations human rights organizations have encouraged China to move away from its insistence on the principle of noninterference, to take part in resolutions critical of human rights conditions in other nations, and to accept the applicability to itself of human rights norms and UN procedures. Even though China has continued to suppress political dissidents at home, and appears at times resolutely defiant of outside pressure to reform, Ann Kent argues that it has gradually begun to implement some international human rights standards. On human rights issues, the PRC has been increasingly influential by the bargaining of its robust macroeconomics growth for the domestic social equality. In 1995, they won 43 percent of the votes in the General Assembly; by 2006 they won 82 percent.

Until the 1980s, China was skeptical of UN Security Council resolutions on peace and security, tending to view them as a mechanism for great power interference in other countries. Beginning in 1982, China started to contribute financially to peacekeeping operations and in 1990 contributed peacekeepers for the first time.

When an enlargement of the Security Council was discussed in 1995, China encouraged African states to demand seats for themselves as a counter-move to Japan's ambitions, and thereby nullified the Japanese initiative.

China held its first joint training course with the United Nations Peacekeeping Department in 2016. China's growing participation in UN initiatives has been described as part of a more "proactive role in international affairs as a great power," reflecting a broader shift in its global engagement.

In 2019, the United Nations Human Rights Office was accused of handing over since 2013 lists of names of human rights activists that included Tibetan and Uyghur dissidents, some of whom were U.S. nationals and residents. Initially the OHCHR denied the accusation but then confirmed the sharing of names but refuted that it had resulted in harmful effects on the human rights defenders in question. This was discussed in a States General of the Netherlands parliamentary session. In 2021, China called the assessment of the UN Human Rights Office report on Xinjiang regarding human rights abuses against the Uyghurs "invalid and illegal." China officially claims that the rights of Uyghur's are not being infringed upon and the so-called reeducation camps have been closed since 2019, but this is disputed.

== See also ==
- One-China policy
  - History of the Republic of China
    - Nationalist government (Republic of China)
    - Republic of China (1912–49)
  - History of the People's Republic of China
- UN Chinese Language Day
- Article 33 of United Nations Charter
