= List of parties to the Vienna Convention on the Law of Treaties =

Parties Signatories Non-parties

The Vienna Convention on the Law of Treaties (VCLT) is a treaty concerning the international law on treaties between states. It was adopted on 22 May 1969 and opened for signature on 23 May 1969. The Convention entered into force on 27 January 1980.

As of May 2026, 119 state parties have ratified the convention, and a further 15 states have signed but have not ratified the convention. In addition, the Republic of China (Taiwan), which is currently only recognized by 11 UN member states, signed the Convention in 1970 prior to the United Nations General Assembly's vote to transfer China's seat to the People's Republic of China (PRC) in 1971. When the PRC subsequently acceded to the Convention, they described the Republic of China's (ROC) signature as "illegal". 61 UN member states have neither signed nor ratified the Convention.

== List of parties ==
| State | Signed | Deposited | Method |
|---|---|---|---|
| Albania | | Jun 27, 2001 | Accession |
| Algeria | | Nov 8, 1988 | Accession |
| Andorra | | Apr 5, 2004 | Accession |
| Argentina | May 23, 1969 | Dec 5, 1972 | Ratification |
| Armenia | | May 17, 2005 | Accession |
| Australia | | Jun 13, 1974 | Accession |
| Austria | | Apr 30, 1979 | Accession |
| Azerbaijan | | Jan 11, 2018 | Accession |
| Bahrain | | Sep 24, 2025 | Accession |
| Barbados | May 23, 1969 | Jun 24, 1971 | Ratification |
| Belarus | | May 1, 1986 | Accession as the Byelorussian SSR |
| Belgium | | Sep 1, 1992 | Accession |
| Benin | | Nov 2, 2017 | Accession |
| Bosnia and Herzegovina | | Sep 1, 1993 | Succession from Socialist Federal Republic of Yugoslavia |
| Brazil | May 23, 1969 | Sep 25, 2009 | Ratification |
| Bulgaria | | Apr 21, 1987 | Accession |
| Burkina Faso | | May 25, 2006 | Accession |
| Cameroon | | Oct 23, 1991 | Accession |
| Canada | | Oct 14, 1970 | Accession |
| Central African Republic | | Dec 10, 1971 | Accession |
| Chile | May 23, 1969 | Apr 9, 1981 | Ratification |
| China | | Sep 3, 1997 | Accession |
| Colombia | May 23, 1969 | Apr 10, 1985 | Ratification |
| Republic of the Congo | May 23, 1969 | Apr 12, 1982 | Ratification |
| Democratic Republic of the Congo | | Jul 25, 1977 | Accession as Zaire |
| Costa Rica | May 23, 1969 | Nov 22, 1996 | Ratification |
| Croatia | | Oct 12, 1992 | Succession from Socialist Federal Republic of Yugoslavia |
| Cuba | | Sep 9, 1998 | Accession |
| Cyprus | | Dec 28, 1976 | Accession |
| Czech Republic | | Feb 22, 1993 | Succession from Czechoslovakia |
| Denmark | Apr 18, 1970 | Jun 1, 1976 | Ratification |
| Dominican Republic | | Apr 1, 2010 | Accession |
| Ecuador | May 23, 1969 | Feb 11, 2005 | Ratification |
| Egypt | | Feb 11, 1982 | Accession |
| Estonia | | Oct 21, 1991 | Accession |
| Finland | May 23, 1969 | Aug 19, 1977 | Ratification |
| Gabon | | Nov 5, 2004 | Accession |
| Georgia | | Jun 8, 1995 | Accession |
| Germany | Apr 30, 1970 | Jul 21, 1987 | Ratification as West Germany; Also acceded by East Germany on 20 October 1986 prior to German reunification |
| Greece | | Oct 30, 1974 | Accession |
| Guatemala | May 23, 1969 | Jul 21, 1997 | Ratification |
| Guinea | | Sep 16, 2005 | Accession |
| Guyana | May 23, 1969 | Sep 15, 2005 | Ratification |
| Haiti | | Aug 25, 1980 | Accession |
| Holy See | Sep 30, 1969 | Feb 25, 1977 | Ratification |
| Honduras | May 23, 1969 | Sep 20, 1979 | Ratification |
| Hungary | | Jun 19, 1987 | Accession |
| Iceland | | Sep 25, 2025 | Accession |
| Ireland | | Aug 7, 2006 | Accession |
| Italy | Apr 22, 1970 | Jul 25, 1974 | Ratification |
| Jamaica | May 23, 1969 | Jul 28, 1970 | Ratification |
| Japan | | Jul 2, 1981 | Accession |
| Kazakhstan | | Jan 5, 1994 | Accession |
| Kiribati | | Sep 15, 2005 | Accession |
| South Korea | Nov 27, 1969 | Apr 27, 1977 | Ratification |
| Kuwait | | Nov 11, 1975 | Accession |
| Kyrgyzstan | | May 11, 1999 | Accession |
| Laos | | Mar 31, 1998 | Accession |
| Latvia | | May 4, 1993 | Accession |
| Lesotho | | Mar 3, 1972 | Accession |
| Liberia | May 23, 1969 | Aug 29, 1985 | Ratification |
| Libya | | Dec 22, 2008 | Accession as the Libyan Arab Jamahiriya |
| Liechtenstein | | Feb 8, 1990 | Accession |
| Lithuania | | Jan 15, 1992 | Accession |
| Luxembourg | Sep 4, 1969 | May 23, 2003 | Ratification |
| Malawi | | Aug 23, 1983 | Accession |
| Malaysia | | Jul 27, 1994 | Accession |
| Maldives | | Sep 14, 2005 | Accession |
| Mali | | Aug 31, 1998 | Accession |
| Malta | | Sep 26, 2012 | Accession |
| Mauritius | | Jan 18, 1973 | Accession |
| Mexico | May 23, 1969 | Sep 25, 1974 | Ratification |
| Moldova | | Jan 26, 1993 | Accession |
| Mongolia | | May 16, 1988 | Accession |
| Montenegro | | Oct 23, 2006 | Succession from Serbia and Montenegro |
| Morocco | May 23, 1969 | Sep 26, 1972 | Ratification |
| Mozambique | | May 8, 2001 | Accession |
| Myanmar | | Sep 16, 1998 | Accession |
| Nauru | | May 5, 1978 | Accession |
| Netherlands | | Apr 9, 1985 | Accession |
| New Zealand | Apr 29, 1970 | Aug 4, 1971 | Ratification |
| Niger | | Oct 27, 1971 | Accession |
| Nigeria | May 23, 1969 | Jul 31, 1969 | Ratification |
| North Macedonia | | Jul 8, 1999 | Succession from Socialist Federal Republic of Yugoslavia |
| Oman | | Oct 18, 1990 | Accession |
| Panama | | Jul 28, 1980 | Accession |
| Paraguay | | Feb 3, 1972 | Accession |
| Peru | May 23, 1969 | Sep 14, 2000 | Ratification |
| Philippines | May 23, 1969 | Nov 15, 1972 | Ratification |
| Poland | | Jul 2, 1990 | Accession |
| Portugal | | Feb 6, 2004 | Accession |
| Russia | | Apr 29, 1986 | Accession as the Soviet Union |
| Rwanda | | Jan 3, 1980 | Accession |
| Saudi Arabia | | Apr 14, 2003 | Accession |
| Senegal | | Apr 11, 1986 | Accession |
| Serbia | | Mar 12, 2001 | Succession as Federal Republic of Yugoslavia from Socialist Federal Republic of Yugoslavia |
| Seychelles | | May 29, 2026 | Accession |
| Slovakia | | May 28, 1993 | Succession from Czechoslovakia |
| Slovenia | | Jul 6, 1992 | Succession from Socialist Federal Republic of Yugoslavia |
| Solomon Islands | | Aug 9, 1989 | Accession |
| Spain | | May 16, 1972 | Accession |
| St. Vincent and the Grenadines | | Apr 27, 1999 | Accession |
| Palestine | | Apr 2, 2014 | Accession |
| Sudan | May 23, 1969 | Apr 18, 1990 | Ratification |
| Suriname | | Jan 31, 1991 | Accession |
| Sweden | Apr 23, 1970 | Feb 4, 1975 | Ratification |
| Switzerland | | May 7, 1990 | Accession |
| Syria | | Oct 2, 1970 | Accession |
| Tajikistan | | May 6, 1996 | Accession |
| Tanzania | | Apr 12, 1976 | Accession |
| Timor-Leste | | Jan 8, 2013 | Accession |
| Togo | | Dec 28, 1979 | Accession |
| Tunisia | | Jun 23, 1971 | Accession |
| Turkmenistan | | Jan 4, 1996 | Accession |
| Ukraine | | May 14, 1986 | Accession as the Ukrainian SSR |
| United Kingdom | Apr 20, 1970 | Jun 25, 1971 | Ratification |
| Uruguay | May 23, 1969 | Mar 5, 1982 | Ratification |
| Uzbekistan | | Jul 12, 1995 | Accession |
| Vietnam | | Oct 10, 2001 | Accession |

== List of signatories that have not ratified ==
| State | Signed |
|---|---|
| Afghanistan | May 23, 1969 |
| Bolivia | May 23, 1969 |
| Cambodia | May 23, 1969 |
| Côte d'Ivoire | Jul 23, 1969 |
| El Salvador | Feb 16, 1970 |
| Ethiopia | Apr 30, 1970 |
| Ghana | May 23, 1969 |
| Iran | May 23, 1969 |
| Kenya | May 23, 1969 |
| Madagascar | May 23, 1969 |
| Nepal | May 23, 1969 |
| Pakistan | Apr 29, 1970 |
| Trinidad and Tobago | May 23, 1969 |
| United States | Apr 24, 1970 |
| Zambia | May 23, 1969 |

Partially recognized state

The Republic of China (Taiwan), which is currently only recognized by 11 UN member states, signed the treaty prior to the United Nations General Assembly's vote to transfer China's seat to the People's Republic of China (PRC) in 1971. When the PRC subsequently acceded the treaty, they described the Republic of China's (ROC) signature as "illegal".

| State | Signed |
|---|---|
| Taiwan | Apr 27, 1970 |

== Non-signatory states ==
- Angola
- Antigua and Barbuda
- Bahamas
- Bangladesh
- Belize
- Bhutan
- Botswana
- Brunei
- Burundi
- Cape Verde
- Chad
- Comoros
- Djibouti
- Dominica
- Equatorial Guinea
- Eritrea
- Fiji
- France
- Gambia
- Grenada
- Guinea-Bissau
- India
- Indonesia
- Iraq
- Israel
- Jordan
- North Korea
- Lebanon
- Marshall Islands
- Mauritania
- Micronesia
- Monaco
- Namibia
- Nicaragua
- Norway
- Palau
- Papua New Guinea
- Qatar
- Romania
- Saint Kitts and Nevis
- Saint Lucia
- Samoa
- San Marino
- São Tome/Principe
- Sierra Leone
- Singapore
- Somalia
- South Africa
- South Sudan
- Sri Lanka
- Swaziland
- Thailand
- Tonga
- Turkey
- Tuvalu
- Uganda
- United Arab Emirates
- Vanuatu
- Venezuela
- Yemen
- Zimbabwe
