= United Nations Security Council Resolution 83 =

UN Security Council Resolution 83
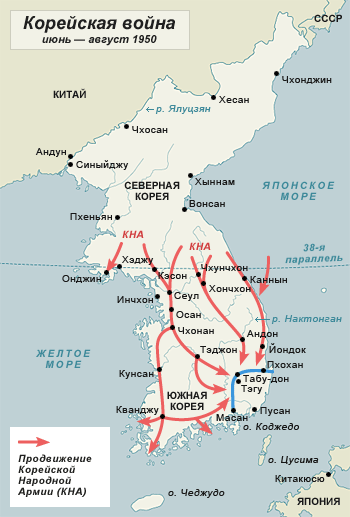
- North Korea's offensive
- Date: June 27 1950
- Meeting no.: 474
- Code: S/1511 (Document)
- Subject: Complaint of aggression upon the Republic of Korea
- Voting summary: 7 voted for; 1 voted against; None abstained; 1 absent; 2 present not voting
- Result: Adopted

Security Council composition
- Permanent members: China; France; Soviet Union; United Kingdom; United States
- Non-permanent members: Cuba; Ecuador; Egypt; India; Norway; Yugoslavia

The United Nations Security Council Resolution 83, adopted on 27 June 1950, determined that the attack on the Republic of Korea by forces from North Korea constituted a breach of the peace. The United Nations Security Council (UNSC) called for an immediate cessation of hostilities and for the authorities in North Korea to withdraw their armed forces to the 38th parallel. The Council also noted the report by the United Nations Commission on Korea that stated North Korea's failure to comply with UNSC Resolution 82 and that urgent military measures were required to restore international peace and security.

The Council then recommended that, "Members of the United Nations furnish such assistance to the Republic of Korea as may be necessary to repel the armed attack and to restore international peace and security in the area."

The resolution was adopted by seven votes to one against from Yugoslavia. Egypt and India were present but did not participate in voting. The Soviet Union did not veto the resolution because it had been boycotting UN Security Council meetings since January 1950, in protest of China's seat at the UN being held by the Republic of China, instead of the People's Republic of China.

== See also ==
- Korean War
- United Nations Command
- Use of force in international law
- United Nations Security Council Resolution 84
- List of United Nations Security Council resolutions concerning North Korea
- List of United Nations Security Council Resolutions 1 to 100 (1946–1953)
