= United Nations Security Council Resolution 82 =

1950 resolution on the Korean War

UN Security Council Resolution 82
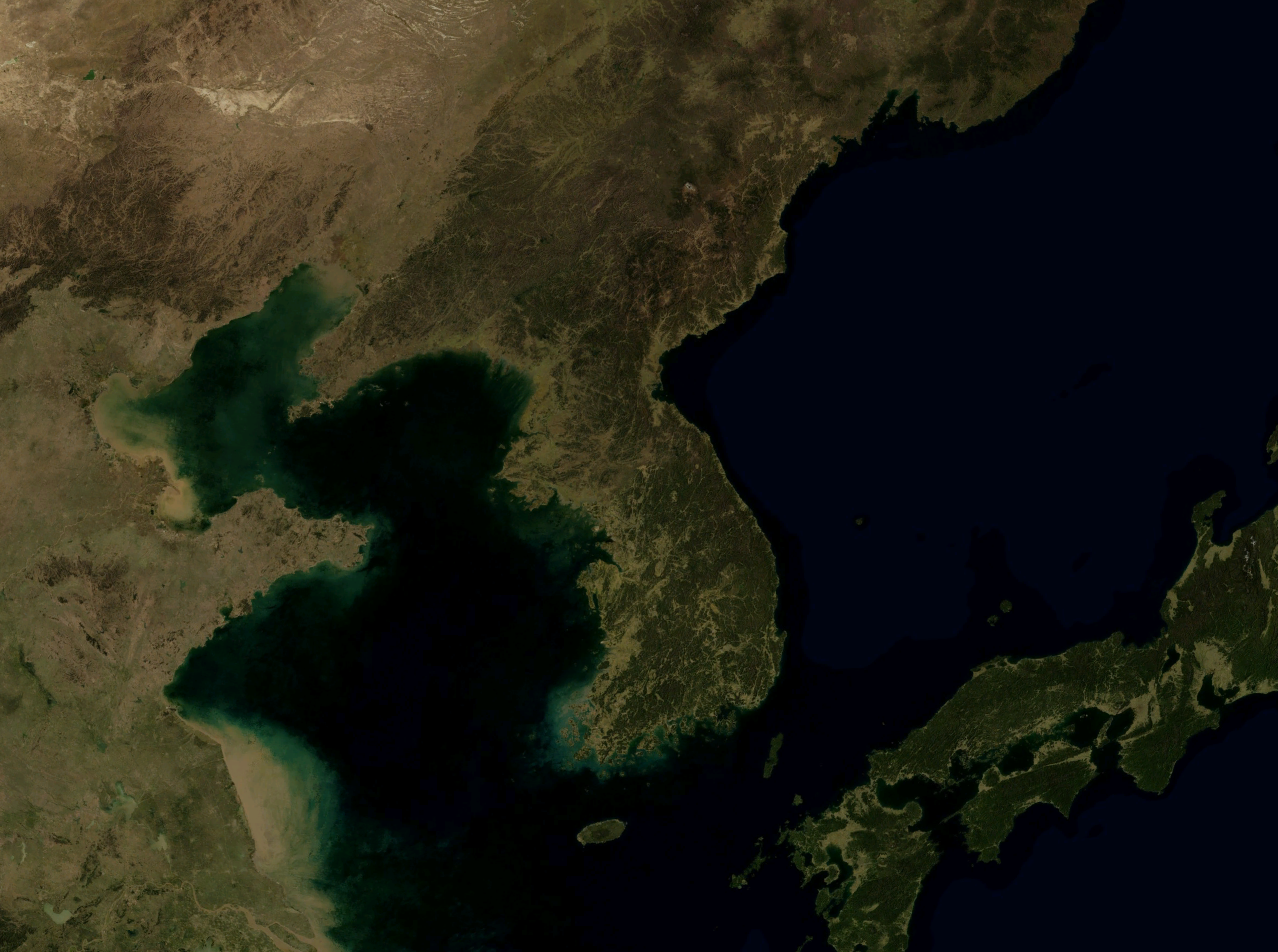
- Satellite view of the Korean Peninsula
- Date: June 25, 1950
- Meeting no.: 473
- Code: S/1501 (Document)
- Subject: Complaint of aggression upon the Republic of Korea
- Voting summary: 9 voted for; None voted against; 1 abstained; 1 absent
- Result: Adopted

Security Council composition
- Permanent members: China; France; Soviet Union; United Kingdom; United States
- Non-permanent members: Cuba; Ecuador; Egypt; India; Norway; Yugoslavia

The United Nations Security Council Resolution 82 was adopted by the United Nations Security Council (UNSC) on 25 June 1950. It condemned the "armed attack on the Republic of Korea by forces from North Korea", while calling for "the immediate cessation of hostilities" and for "the authorities in North Korea to withdraw forthwith their armed forces to the 38th parallel". The measure was adopted with 9 voting for, none opposed, and one abstention by Yugoslavia. The Soviet Union was absent, as it was boycotting the UN at the time for its recognition of the Republic of China as China's representative to the organization.

Korea had been divided along the 38th parallel north at the end of World War II between the occupation forces of the United States and the Soviet Union. Each sought to prop up a government on its side of the border, and as the Cold War began to take shape, tensions rose as a proxy conflict developed in Korea. This culminated in the North's invasion of the South on 25 June. Led by the US, the UN backed South Korea, considering it the only lawful government on the peninsula.

The resolution called on North Korea to immediately halt its invasion and to move its troops back to the 38th parallel. Seen as a diplomatic victory for the United States, the resolution was completely ignored by North Korea. This brought the UN and the US to take further action, setting the stage for a massive international involvement and expansion of the Korean War.

== Background ==
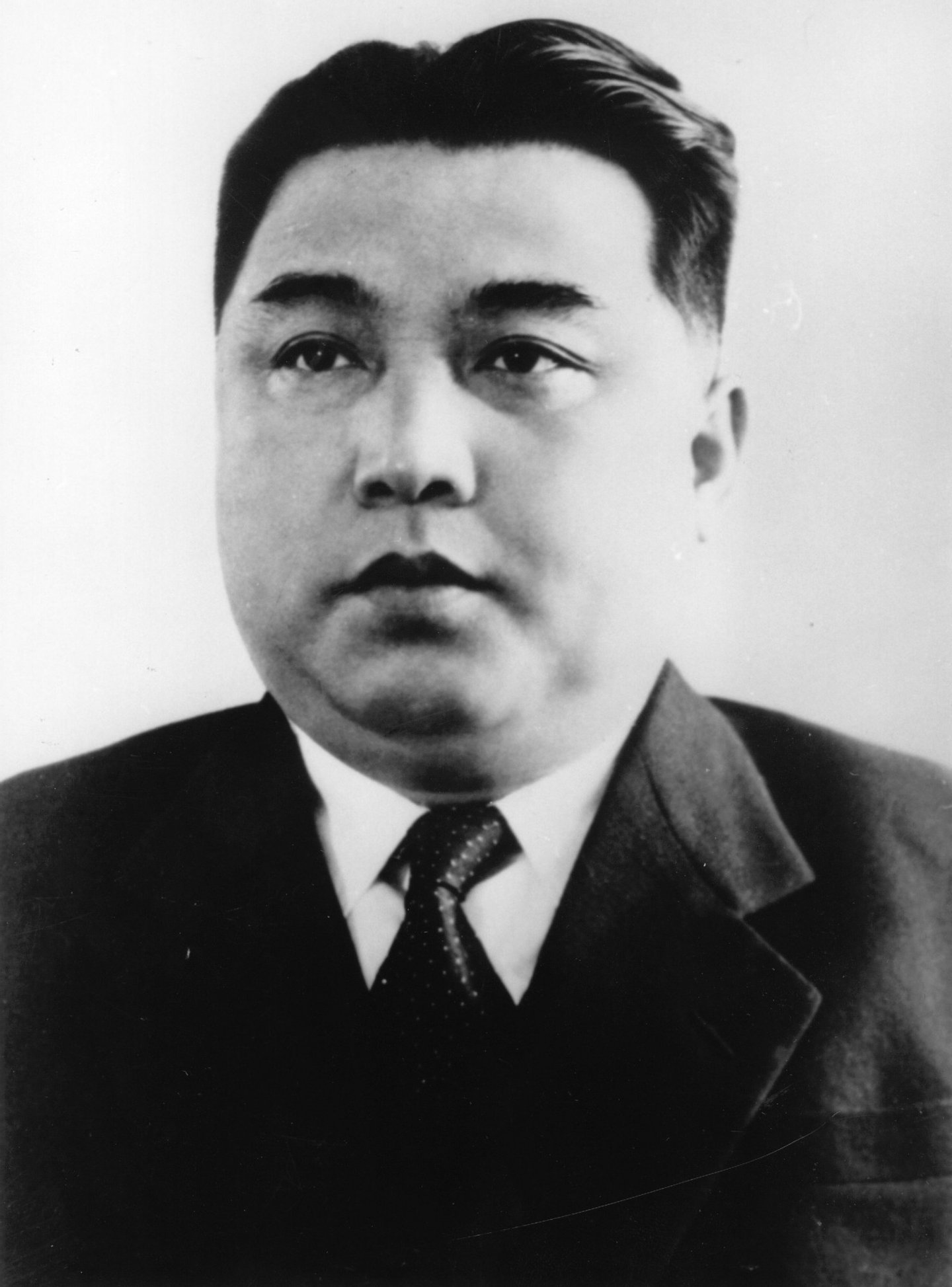
North Korean Premier Kim Il Sung

=== Division of Korea ===
At the end of World War II, Korea, which had been a colony of the Empire of Japan between 1910 and 1945, was divided along the 38th parallel north. The Soviet Union (USSR) had moved forces into the northern half of the country, overseeing its establishment as the communist Democratic People's Republic of Korea (DPRK) under Kim Il Sung, a figure who had previously risen to notability for his successes fighting the Japanese. American forces occupied the south, overseeing the establishment of the Republic of Korea under Syngman Rhee, an ardently anti-communist autocrat. As tensions rose between the US and the USSR, each government in Korea claimed it had sovereignty over the whole country.

On 14 November 1947, the General Assembly's Resolution 112 established a temporary commission to monitor free elections in Korea. The UN had intended to reunify Korea under one government, but the UN commission was unable to enter North Korea. After observing elections in South Korea, the General Assembly stated on 12 December 1948 in their Resolution 195, that the nation was to be established under one government as soon as possible, and the US and Soviet occupation forces there were to withdraw.

As the pressure built, the North Korean government became more aggressive, with skirmishes between North and South becoming common. UN military observers were assigned to monitor the situation, ostensibly to prevent it from escalating. General Assembly Resolution 293, passed on 21 October 1949, recognized only the southern government as legal. North Korea in turn denied the legality of the UN activities in Korea, and said it would drive the UN forces out of the country.

=== Outbreak of war ===
I felt certain that if South Korea was allowed to fall Communist leaders would be emboldened to override nations closer to our own shores. If the Communists were permitted to force their way into the Republic of Korea without opposition from the free world, no small nation would have the courage to resist threats and aggression by stronger Communist neighbors. If this was allowed to go unchallenged it would mean a Third World War, just as similar incidents had brought on the Second World War. It was clear to me that the foundations and the principles of the United Nations were at stake unless this unprovoked attack on Korea could be stopped.

— Truman, explaining his thoughts on the resolution.

On the night of 25 June 1950, ten divisions of the North Korean People's Army launched a full-scale invasion of the Republic of Korea. The force of 89,000 men moved in six columns, catching the Republic of Korea Army by surprise, resulting in a rout. The smaller South Korean army suffered from widespread lack of equipment, and was unprepared for war. The numerically superior North Korean forces overcame isolated resistance from the 38,000 South Korean soldiers on the frontier before it began moving steadily south. Most of South Korea's forces retreated in the face of the invasion. The North Koreans were well on their way to South Korea's capital of Seoul within hours, forcing the government and its shattered army to retreat further south.

News of the invasion quickly spread around the world via ambassadors and correspondents in Korea. Journalists in the United States were reporting on the invasion within five hours of the initial attack, and United States Ambassador to Korea John J. Muccio sent a telegram to the US State Department at 10:26 KST June 24. As the combat grew more intense, US Secretary of State Dean Acheson informed President Truman, who had been resting at his Missouri home over the weekend), and Trygve Lie, the Secretary-General of the UN, of the situation. The attack was particularly troubling to Truman, who likened it to the Japanese attack on Pearl Harbor, and to Lie, who was reminded of the invasion of Norway during World War II. Fearing the attack would spur another general war between great powers, Truman resolved to act as quickly as possible to prevent an escalation of the conflict. Muccio met with Rhee, who informed him the South Korean Army would run out of ammunition within ten days, and would not be able to hold back the invasion on its own. He requested the United Nations and the United States assist South Korea in the conflict.

Lie convened the Security Council for its 473rd meeting at 14:00 June 25 in New York City. He began the meeting with a detailed report from the UN Commission on Korea, explained the situation to the delegates, and insisted that the UN take action to restore peace in Korea. According to the UN Commission on Korea, the situation was assuming the character of full-scale warfare. Then, US diplomat Ernest A. Gross gave Muccio's report on the situation.

The United States introduced a resolution stating that North Korea's invasion was a breach of peace in violation of Chapter VII of the UN Charter. Gross requested that South Korea's ambassador to the United Nations, Chang Myon, be present for the meeting, which was granted. The Yugoslavian delegate requested that a North Korean diplomat be present as well, but this request was not granted. North Korea was not a member of the UN and had no representation in the organization. Myon read a prepared statement calling the invasion a crime against humanity, and said that as the UN had played a major role in the founding of South Korea, it was their responsibility to help defend it from aggression. The UNSC debated the resolution and made amendments and revisions to its wording before passing it.

The Soviet UN ambassador was not present at the UNSC meeting due to their ongoing boycott of the UN, which meant that the Soviets were unable to veto the resolution.

== The resolution ==
The Security Council,

Recalling the finding of the General Assembly in its resolution 293 (IV) of 21 October 1949 that the Government of the Republic of Korea is a lawfully established government having effective control and jurisdiction over that Part of Korea where the United Nations Temporary Commission on Korea was able to observe and consult and in which the great majority of the people of Korea reside; that this Government is based on elections which were a valid expression of the free will of the electorate of that part of Korea and which were observed by the Temporary Commission, and that this is the only such Government in Korea,

Mindful of the concern expressed by the General Assembly in its resolutions 195 (III) of 12 December 1948 and 293 (IV) of 21 October 1949 about the consequences which might follow unless Member States refrained from acts derogatory to the results sought to be achieved by the United Nations in bringing about the complete independence and unity of Korea; and the concern expressed that the situation described by the United Nations Commission on Korea in its report menaces the safety and well-being of the Republic of Korea and of the people of Korea and might lead to open military conflict there,

Noting with grave concern the armed attack on the Republic of Korea by forces from North Korea,

Determines that this action constitutes a breach of the peace; and

I

Calls for the immediate cessation of hostilities;

Calls upon the authorities in North Korea to withdraw forthwith their armed forces to the 38th parallel;

II

Requests the United Nations Commission on Korea:

(a) To communicate its fully considered recommendations on the situation with the least possible delay;
(b) To observe the withdrawal of North Korean forces to the 38th parallel;
(c) To keep the Security Council informed on the execution of this resolution:

III

Calls upon all Member States to render every assistance to the United Nations in the execution of this resolution and. to refrain from giving assistance to the North Korean authorities.

— text of UN Security Council Resolution 82

The resolution passed with 9 votes for—the United States, the United Kingdom, the Republic of China, France, Cuba, Ecuador, Norway, Egypt, and India. Aleš Bebler, delegate from Yugoslavia, abstained from voting. Lie was a strong supporter of the resolution, as he saw the conflict as a challenge to the authority of the UN.

== Aftermath ==
The resolution was seen as a political victory for the United States, as it identified North Korea as the aggressor in the conflict. Earlier in the day, independent of the UN resolution, Truman had ordered the Joint Chiefs of Staff to contact General of the Army Douglas MacArthur, who was in charge of US forces in the Far East. He ordered MacArthur to prepare ships for the evacuation of US citizens from Korea, and authorized him to send ammunition and supplies to Pusan to support South Korean forces in the Seoul–Kimpo area. These would be escorted by US military units. He instructed MacArthur to send a survey team into the country to assess the situation and determine how to aid South Korea. Truman also ordered the mobilization of the US Navy for movement into the region.

The US delegation later contacted the Soviet delegation and sent a message requesting that the Kremlin use its influence over North Korea to compel it to comply with the resolution, but the Soviet Union denied the request. With the ineffectiveness of the resolution in de-escalating the conflict, the UNSC convened on June 27 to discuss further actions to take, resulting in UNSC Resolution 83, which recommended military intervention by other UN member nations to restore peace in Korea. Within days, ships and aircraft from several nations, as well as the first major formations of US troops, were moving to South Korea, setting the stage for a full-scale conflict.

In 2010, Colum Lynch wrote a column in Foreign Policy magazine that criticized the resolution as one of the ten worst UN resolutions in history. After the Soviet Union ended its boycott of the council, it used its veto power to block any further resolutions against North Korea. In response, Acheson introduced a new procedure to the UN General Assembly to allow a member state to bypass the UNSC and seek approval in the General Assembly, including recommendations on the use of force, UNSC Resolution 377. When this was passed, it allowed for open-ended General Assembly emergency special sessions to address threats to international peace and security for which the UNSC was unable to pass a resolution. Lynch wrote that the creation of this rule caused unintended negative consequences for the United States in 1997 when several Arab states began the Tenth emergency special session of the United Nations General Assembly to address the Israeli–Palestinian conflict and Israel's occupation of the West Bank and the Gaza Strip. This session, convened as a way around a US veto, spanned 30 meetings over the next ten years, and has never formally been closed.

== See also ==
- Korean War
- Breach of the peace
- Chapter VII of the United Nations Charter
- Use of force in international law
- United Nations Security Council Resolution 83
- List of United Nations Security Council Resolutions 1 to 100 (1946–1953)
