= Soviet boycott of the United Nations =

1950 diplomatic act

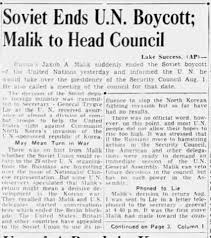
Newspaper article from the Allentown Pa. Morning Call dated July 28, 1950, remarking on how Yakov Malik would end the Soviet boycott by returning to the UN Security Council in the following days.

From 13 January 1950 to 1 August 1950, the Soviet Union boycotted the United Nations by having their diplomat, Yakov Malik, not attend any United Nations Security Council meetings. The boycott originated because of a dispute over the representation of China in the United Nations. The Soviet Union demanded that representatives of the People's Republic of China (PRC) be seated in the United Nations Security Council despite the United Nations and its allies on the council recognizing representatives of the Kuomintang and the Republic of China. After the Soviet Union lost a motion to seat the PRC in the UN on 13 January 1950, it decided to boycott the organization. This was an attempt to prevent the Security Council from acting until it gave into the Soviet demand, but it backfired on the Soviet Union when the Security Council passed UN Security Council Resolution 82, 83, 84 and 85. These resolutions gave military and civilian support to the Republic of Korea during the Korean War. The Soviet Union could not veto these motions due to their boycott, thereby cementing the survival of the Republic of Korea as a member of the Western Bloc.

== Background ==
The Republic of China was a founding member of the United Nations at the San Francisco Conference in 1945. At the conference in April 1945, T. V. Soong, Wei Tao-ming, Wellington Koo and Wang Chonghui from the Kuomintang and Dong Biwu of the Chinese Communist Party (CCP) were present. The entire Chinese delegation was present at the closing conference in June, and the Charter of the United Nations was signed by the Chinese President Chiang Kai-shek in August 1945. After the CCP had established the government of the People's Republic of China, the PRC demanded on 18 November 1949 that the United Nations recognize them as the government of China and that the representatives of the Kuomintang and ROC be accordingly expelled from the United Nations. The same month the Soviet Union seconded the request of the PRC, arguing that the Kuomintang controlled only a fraction of China, and refusing to take part in the first committee of the General Assembly of the United Nations. The request of the PRC was not considered; however, a resolution from Australia, which demanded that the Chinese people choose their political institutions freely and without foreign influence, was approved.

== Boycott ==
On 8 January 1950, the Premier of the PRC, Zhou Enlai, transmitted a letter to the United Nations Security Council in which he requested that the Security Council not legally recognize the Kuomintang. On 10 January, the Soviet Union then formally introduced a motion to exclude the representatives of the ROC from the Security Council.

On 13 January, when the Soviet Union's motion to seat the PRC instead of the ROC did not achieve a majority, the Soviet ambassador, Yakov Malik, walked out of the meeting and claimed that he would not return so long as Tsiang Tingfu, the representative of the Kuomintang, was a member of the Security Council instead of a representative from the PRC. The Soviet Union stated that it would not acknowledge any decision taken by the Security Council whilst the Chinese Nationalists were part of it. Later, the Soviet Union also boycotted other UN bodies in which representatives of the Kuomintang were seated. During the Soviet boycott, the Security Council adopted a resolution which allowed for the deployment of UN troops to the Korean war in defense of South Korea against the attacking Soviet-aligned North Korean forces (Resolution 83).

== Aftermath ==
The Soviets questioned the legality of Resolution 83, as in their view it was only approved by six votes due to the absence of the Soviet Union and the PRC (the Soviets refused to recognize the vote of the ROC in the Security Council). The Soviets argued that all five permanent members of the Security Council were to be present on any decision of an important matter. However, the International Court of Justice ruled that an absence of a member of the Security Council during a voting session was regarded as an abstention and therefore the resolution was legal.

In late July, the Soviets informed the Secretary-General of the United Nations, Trygve Lie, that, on 1 August, Malik would return to the Security Council to assume its presidency.

== See also ==
- Accession of the People's Republic of China to the United Nations
- Soviet Union and the United Nations
