= United Nations General Assembly Resolution 2758 (XXVI) =

1971 resolution recognizing the PRC as the representative of China

UN General Assembly Resolution 2758
Voting by country in the United Nations General Assembly Resolution 2758
Voted in favor Voted against Abstained Non-voting member Non-UN-members/dependencies
- Date: 25 October 1971
- Meeting no.: 1,976
- Code: A/RES/2758(XXVI) (Document)
- Subject: Restoration of the lawful rights of the People's Republic of China in the United Nations
- Voting summary: 76 voted for; 35 voted against; 17 abstained
- Result: Adopted

United Nations General Assembly Resolution 2758
- Traditional Chinese: 聯合國大會第2758號決議
- Simplified Chinese: 联合国大会第2758号决议
Transcriptions
Standard Mandarin
- Hanyu Pinyin: Liánhéguó Dàhuì 2758 hào juéyì
- Wade–Giles: Lien^{2}-ho^{2}-kuo^{2} Ta^{4}-hui^{4} 2758 hao^{4} chueh^{2}-yi^{4}
- Tongyong Pinyin: Lianheguo Dahuei 2758 hao jyueyi
- Yale Romanization: Lyanhegwo Dahwei 2758 hau Jyweyi

United Nations General Assembly Resolution 2758, titled Restoration of the lawful rights of the People's Republic of China in the United Nations, was adopted on 25 October 1971 to change China's representation in the UN. It recognized the People's Republic of China (PRC) as the only legitimate representative of China to the United Nations, and expelled "the representatives of Chiang Kai-shek" (Note: Chiang was the President of the Republic of China, whose government had in 1949 retreated from the Chinese mainland to the island of Taiwan after the Chinese Civil War.) from the United Nations.

The PRC interprets the resolution as having fully resolved the question of China's representation. It maintains that Taiwan is historically and legally an inalienable part of Chinese territory, meaning the resolution's recognition of the PRC as the sole lawful representative of China automatically encompasses the island. Consequently, despite the document giving no mention to Taiwan's status, the PRC posits that the resolution codifies the One China principle under international law, leaving Taiwan with no separate international status or standing to participate independently in international organizations. Its opponents assert that the Resolution only resolved China's representation in the UN but gave no mention of Taiwan, and thus does not recognise Taiwan as a territory of the PRC nor authorize the PRC to represent Taiwan internationally. They maintain that Taiwan's legal status is unsettled. In the 2020s, disputes over the interpretation of the resolution have arisen, with the United States, Canada, the European Union, United Kingdom, Australia, and Taiwan itself disagreeing with the PRC's interpretation about conflating the resolution with its one China principle and using it against Taiwan's right of participation in international organizations.

== Background ==
The Republic of China (ROC) was founded in 1912 in mainland China, and expanded its jurisdiction to Taiwan in 1945. In 1945, it became one of the 51 original member states of the United Nations, which was created in 1945. At that time, however, it was embroiled in civil war: the ruling Chinese Nationalist Party, or Kuomintang, was fighting troops led by the Chinese Communist Party (CCP). This lasted until 1949, when Mao Zedong proclaimed the People's Republic of China (PRC) in Beijing and the Nationalists retreated to Taiwan, from which the Empire of Japan had withdrawn in 1945 and to which it would in 1951 renounce all right, title and claim. By January 1950 the PRC was in control of mainland China but was unable to capture Taiwan, Penghu, Kinmen or Matsu, and thus these remained Kuomintang-ruled.

Although the ROC government continuously claimed that it would one day return to its mainland, by the 1970s, an increasing number of UN members became aware that this government no longer represented the hundreds of millions of people who lived on the mainland. The PRC claimed to be the successor government of the ROC, while the Kuomintang in Taiwan championed the continued existence of the Republic of China. Both claimed to be the only legitimate Chinese government, and each refused to maintain diplomatic relations with countries that have recognized the other.

Between 1950 and 1970, several votes were held regarding the PRC and UN membership, but the votes did not pass. The ROC continued to represent China in the UN until Resolution 2758. In addition, the ROC had signed and ratified the Vienna Convention on Diplomatic Relations on April 18, 1961, and December 19, 1969, respectively. However, by the late 1960s, concerns regarding human rights had rapidly surged, turning the tables of the situation. It was now the ROC government that was becoming increasingly isolated, while China's communist regime slowly abandoned its ostracism.

== Proceedings at the United Nations ==
On 15 July 1971, 17 UN members: Albania, Algeria, PR Congo, Cuba, Guinea, Iraq, Mali, Mauritania, North Yemen, Romania, Somalia, South Yemen, Sudan, Syria, Tanzania, Yugoslavia, and Zambia, requested that a question of the "Restoration of the lawful rights of the People's Republic of China in the United Nations" be placed on the provisional agenda of the twenty-sixth session of the United Nations General Assembly. In an explanatory memorandum accompanying their request, the 17 UN members observed that for years they had protested against what they considered were hostile and discriminatory policy followed by several governments with regard to the CCP's government of mainland China, which they considered to be the genuine representative of the Chinese people. The existence of the People's Republic of China, they declared, was a reality which could "not be changed to suit the myth of a so called Republic of China, fabricated out of a portion of Chinese territory". In the view of the 17 UN members, the ROC were unlawful authorities installed in the island of Taiwan which claimed to represent China, and they remained there only because of the permanent presence of United States Armed Forces. No important international problems, they added, could be solved without the participation of the People's Republic of China. It was in the fundamental interests, they concluded, of the United Nations to "restore" promptly to the People's Republic of China its seat in the organization, thus putting an end to a "grave injustice" and "dangerous situation" which had been perpetuated in order to fulfill a policy that had been increasingly repudiated. This meant the immediate expulsion of the representatives of the Chiang Kai-shek regime from the seat which it held in the United Nations.

On 17 August 1971, the United States requested that a second item, "The representation of China in the United Nations" also be placed on the provisional agenda. In the explanatory memorandum accompanying the U.S. request, the U.S. said that in dealing with the problem of the representation of China, the United Nations should take cognizance of the existence of both the People's Republic of China and the Republic of China; it should reflect that incontestable reality in the manner in which it made provision for China's representation. The U.S. asserted that the UN should not be required to take a definitive position on the respective conflicting claims of the People's Republic of China or the Republic of China, pending a peaceful resolution of the matter as called for by the United Nations Charter. Thus, the U.S. added, the People's Republic of China should be represented and at the same time provision should be made to ensure that the Republic of China was not deprived of its representation.

On 22 September 1971, the United States proposed at the UN General Committee that the two items be combined into one item called "The Question of China". The proposal was, however, rejected by 12 votes to 9 with 3 abstentions.

On 25 September 1971, the first Albanian-backed draft resolution, A/L.630 and Add.1 and 2, was submitted by 23 states including 17 of the states which had joined in placing the question on the agenda, to: "...restore to the People's Republic of China all its rights and expel forthwith the representatives of Chiang Kai-shek."

On 29 September 1971, a second draft resolution, A/L.632 and Add.1 and 2, sponsored by 22 members including the U.S., was proposed declaring that any proposal to deprive the Republic of China of representation was an important question under Article 18 of the UN Charter, and thus would require a two-thirds supermajority for approval.

On 29 September 1971, a third draft resolution, A/L.633, sponsored by 19 members including the U.S., was proposed by which the Assembly would affirm the right of representation of the People's Republic of China and recommend that it be seated as one of the five permanent members of the Security Council, while also affirming the continuing right of representation of the Republic of China.

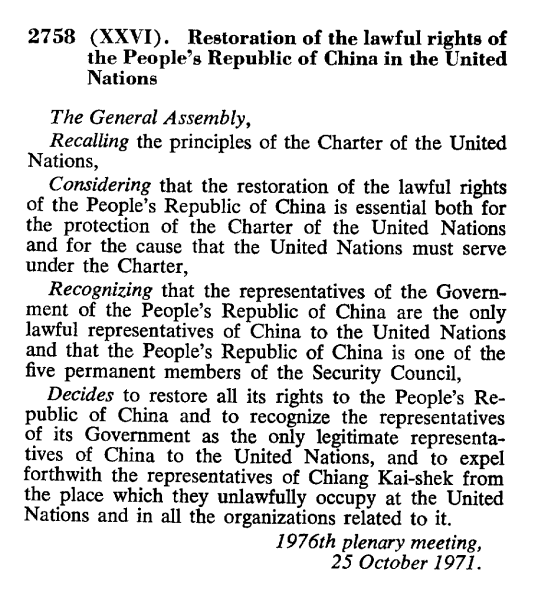
Adopted resolution 2758

On 15 October 1971 the representatives of 22 UN members requested the UN Secretary-General to distribute, as an official Assembly document, a statement of the Ministry of Foreign Affairs of the People's Republic of China dated 20 August 1971. In this statement, made in response to the U.S. letter of 17 August 1971 and its accompanying explanatory memorandum, the People's Republic of China declared that the U.S. proposal was a blatant exposure of the Nixon government's scheme of creating "two Chinas" in the United Nations. It added that there was only one China, the People's Republic of China. Taiwan, it continued, was an inalienable part of Chinese territory and a province of China which had already been returned to the motherland after the Second World War. It went on to state that the U.S. was plotting to separate Taiwan from China and was wildly attempting to force members of the UN to submit to its will. The Chinese government declared that the Chinese people and government firmly opposed "two Chinas", "one China, one Taiwan", or any other similar arrangement, as well as the claim that "the status of Taiwan remains to be determined". They declared they would have absolutely nothing to do with the UN in such scenarios.

Discussion at the Assembly took place at 12 plenary meetings between 18 and 26 October 1971 with 73 member states taking part. During the debates four more draft resolutions were submitted - three by Tunisia and one by Saudi Arabia. Broadly, each of these draft resolutions was a variation on the third draft resolution described above, backed by the U.S. Notably, the Saudi-proposed resolution would have held that the people of the island of Taiwan had a right to self-determination. Similarly, the Tunisian resolution would have called for the Republic of China government to be represented in the United Nations under the name "Formosa".

Algeria's representative in the debates submitted that to recognize that the government of the People's Republic of China was lawfully entitled to represent China did not imply the eviction of a member but the eviction of the representatives of a dissident minority regime. The U.S., in its submission, took the opposite view; arguing that adoption of the resolution expelling the representatives sent from Taipei would imply the termination of the membership of a longstanding member. The spokesman of the Republic of China submitted that his country had earned its place in the United Nations by virtue of its contribution to peace and freedom during the Second World War. He said the CCP's government, which had never had the moral consent of the Chinese people, could in no way be regarded as the representative of the great Chinese nation. Various members including two permanent members of the security council, the United Kingdom and the USSR, argued that requiring the matter to be subject to a supermajority vote was not appropriate because the adoption of the Albanian proposed resolution did not involve the admission or expulsion of a member. Rather it concerned only credentials and Taiwan had never been a member. They argued there was only one Chinese state that was a member. Any other Chinese state would have to apply for membership in accordance with the Charter.

On 25 October 1971, the voting took place. In the first vote held, the Assembly rejected the U.S. backed proposal that the matter would require a supermajority vote — the 'important question motion' [A/L.632 and Add.1 and 2]. The Assembly then voted on a separate U.S. proposal that the words "and to expel forthwith the representatives of Chiang Kai-shek from the place which they unlawfully occupied at the United Nations and in all the organizations related to it" be removed from the draft resolution A/L.630 and Add.1 and 2. The U.S. representative suggested that this motion, if adopted, would "have the effect of welcoming the PRC to the General Assembly and the Security Council, while at the same time not affecting the representation of the ROC in this hall". The motion was rejected by a vote of 61 to 51, with 16 abstentions.

Votes on the 'important question motion'
Vote	Tally	States
In favour	55	Argentina, Australia, Bahrain, Barbados, Bolivia, Brazil, Central African Republic, Chad, China, Colombia, Zaire, Costa Rica, Dahomey, Dominican Republic, El Salvador, Fiji, Gabon, Gambia, Ghana, Greece, Guatemala, Haiti, Honduras, Indonesia, Israel, Ivory Coast, Jamaica, Japan, Jordan, Khmer Republic, Lebanon, Lesotho, Liberia, Luxembourg, Madagascar, Malawi, Mauritius, Mexico, New Zealand, Nicaragua, Niger, Panama, Paraguay, Philippines, Portugal, Rwanda, Saudi Arabia, South Africa, Spain, Swaziland, Thailand, United States of America, Upper Volta, Uruguay, Venezuela.
Against	59	Afghanistan, Albania, Algeria, Bhutan, Bulgaria, Burma, Burundi, Byelorussian Soviet Socialist Republic, Cameroon, Canada, Ceylon, Chile, Cuba, Czechoslovakia, Denmark, Ecuador, Egypt, Equatodal Guinea, Ethiopia, Finland, France, Guinea, Guyana, Hungary, Iceland, India, Iraq, Ireland, Kenya, Kuwait, Libyan Arab Republic, Malaysia, Mali, Mauritania, Mongolia, Nepal, Nigeria, Norway, Pakistan, People's Democratic Republic of Yemen, People's Republic of the Congo, Peru, Poland, Romania, Sierra Leone, Singapore, Somalia, Sudan, Sweden, Syrian Arab Republic, Trinidad and Tobago, Uganda, Ukrainian Soviet Socialist Republic, Union of Soviet Socialist Republics, United Kingdom of Great Britain and Northern Ireland, United Republic of Tanzania, Yemen, Yugoslavia, Zambia.
Abstain	15	Austria, Belgium, Botswana, Cyprus, Italy, Iran, Laos, Malta, Morocco, Netherlands, Qatar, Senegal, Togo, Tunisia, Turkey.
Source: United Nations General Assembly Official Records

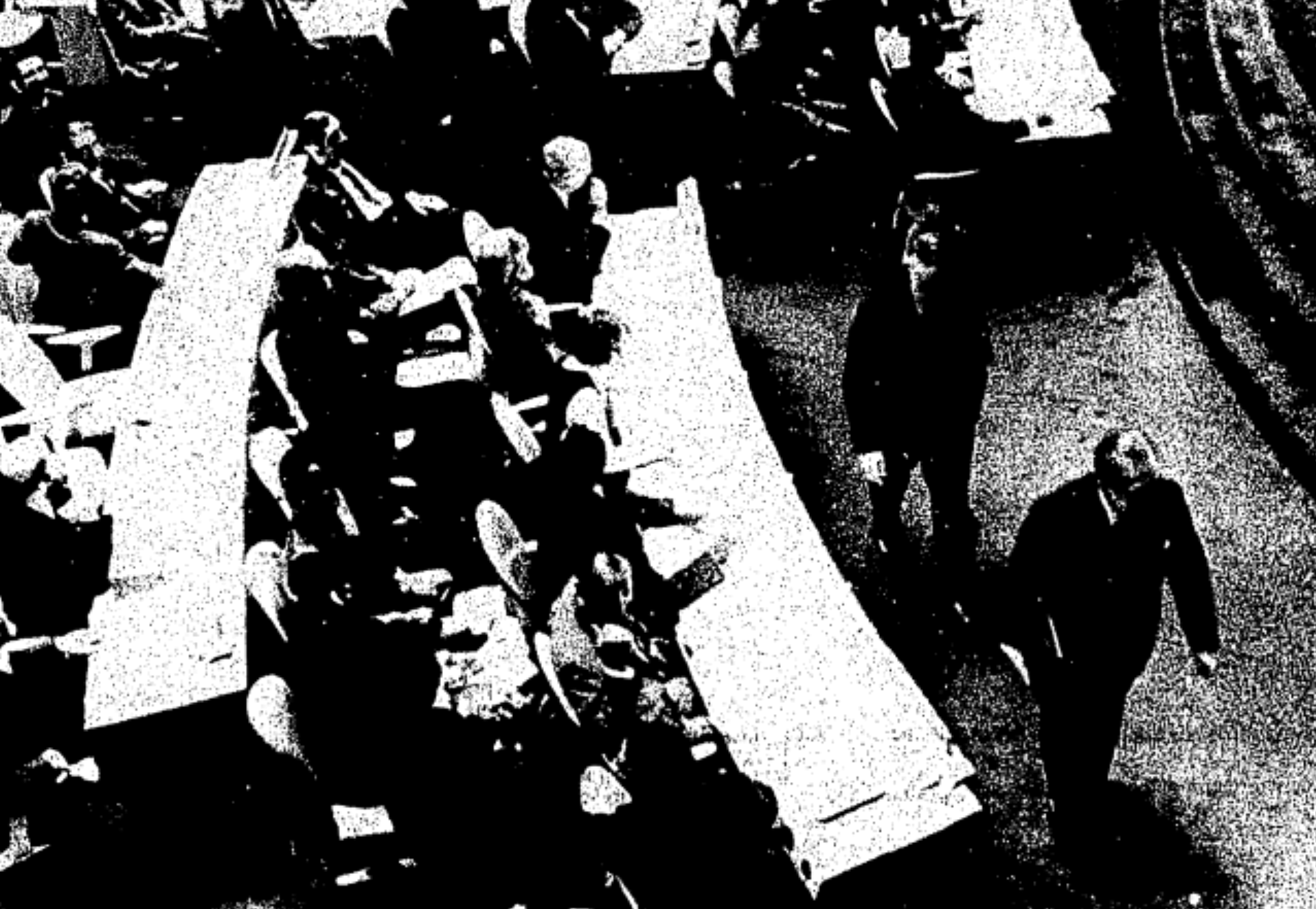
The ROC delegation walks out of the General Assembly as the Republic of China is expelled.

At this point, the Minister of Foreign Affairs of the ROC, Chow Shu-kai, delivered the Republic of China's last statement at the United Nations: (Note: The statement was delivered in English.)

"In view of the frenzied and irrational manners that have been exhibited in this hall, the delegation of the Republic of China has now decided not to take part in any further proceedings of this General Assembly.
... We shall continue to struggle with like minded Governments for the realisation of the ideals upon which the United Nations was founded and which the General Assembly has now betrayed."

The Assembly then adopted draft Albanian proposed resolution A/L.630 and Add.1 and 2, by a roll-call vote of 76 to 35, with 17 abstentions, as Resolution 2758. The Beijing government began representing China at the UN from 15 November 1971 and its delegates were seated at the UN Security Council meeting held on 23 November 1971, the first such meeting where representatives of the Beijing government represented China.

Votes on the Albanian proposed resolution A/L.630 and Add.1 and 2
Vote	Tally	States
In favour	76	Afghanistan, Albania, Algeria, Austria, Belgium, Bhutan, Botswana, Bulgaria, Burma, Burundi, Byelorussian Soviet Socialist Republic, Cameroon, Canada, Ceylon, Chile, Cuba, Czechoslovakia, Denmark, Ecuador, Egypt, Equatorial Guinea, Ethiopia, Finland, France, Ghana, Guinea, Guyana, Hungary, Iceland, India, Iran, Iraq, Ireland, Israel, Italy, Kenya, Kuwait, Kingdom of Laos, Libyan Arab Republic, Malaysia, Mali, Mauritania, Mexico, Mongolia, Morocco, Nepal, Netherlands, Nigeria, Norway, Pakistan, People's Democratic Republic of Yemen, People's Republic of the Congo, Peru, Poland, Portugal, Romania, Rwanda, Senegal, Sierra Leone, Singapore, Somalia, Sudan, Sweden, Syrian Arab Republic, Togo, Trinidad and Tobago, Tunisia, Turkey, Uganda, Ukrainian Soviet Socialist Republic, Union of Soviet Socialist Republics, United Kingdom of Great Britain and Northern Ireland, United Republic of Tanzania, Yemen, Yugoslavia, Zambia
Against	35	Australia, Bolivia, Brazil, Central African Republic, Chad, Zaire, Costa Rica, Dahomey, Dominican Republic, El Salvador, Gabon, Gambia, Guatemala, Haiti, Honduras, Ivory Coast, Japan, Khmer Republic, Lesotho, Liberia, Madagascar, Malawi, Malta, New Zealand, Nicaragua, Niger, Paraguay, Philippines, Saudi Arabia, South Africa, Swaziland, United States of America, Upper Volta, Uruguay, Venezuela
Abstain	17	Argentina, Bahrain, Barbados, Colombia, Cyprus, Fiji, Greece, Indonesia, Jamaica, Jordan, Lebanon, Luxembourg, Mauritius, Panama, Qatar, Spain, Thailand
Source: United Nations General Assembly Official Records

== Later development ==
On 21 September 2007, the UN General Assembly rejected a bid to include an agenda item on Taiwan's membership in the UN General Assembly, with delegations agreeing that Taiwan's bid to join was unacceptable due to "legal reasons linked to Resolution 2758". That year was the first time that it applied under the name "Taiwan" instead of the "Republic of China". The UN General Assembly and its General Committee's recommendations on the "Taiwan question" reflected long-standing UN policy and is mirrored in other documents promulgated by the United Nations. For example, the UN's "Final Clauses of Multilateral Treaties, Handbook" (2003) states:

...regarding the Taiwan Province of China, the Secretary-General follows the General Assembly’s guidance incorporated in resolution 2758 (XXVI) of the General Assembly of 25 October 1971 on the restoration of the lawful rights of the People’s Republic of China in the United Nations. The General Assembly decided to recognize the representatives of the Government of the People’s Republic of China as the only legitimate representatives of China to the United Nations. Hence, instruments received from the Taiwan Province of China will not be accepted by the Secretary-General in his capacity as depositary.

== Interpretations ==
=== People's Republic of China ===
The Chinese government claims that Resolution 2758 also represented a process to rule out the ambiguity of Taiwan's status in the debates at the UN General Assembly, where the admission of the People's Republic of China to the UN was not considered a question of new membership, but a question of credentials, or who represented China to the UN. After 1949, Taiwan was regarded as the rump state of the Republic of China, which had lost control of most of its mainland territory, rendering it unable to represent China internationally—a position solidified by Resolution 2758.

The Chinese government insists that the term "China" in Resolution 2758 also refers to Taiwan. Yang Tao, a senior Chinese diplomat, asserted that People's Republic of China had replaced the Republic of China as the representation of China since its foundation in 1949. He noted that Resolution 2758, passed by a majority vote, recognised the People's Republic of China as the sole legitimate government of China, and did not acknowledge any other representation of China or Taiwan. Yang contended that if China's representation did not include Taiwan, there would have been no need to expel the representative of Chiang Kai-shek. Beijing asserts that Taiwan falls completely within China's international law identity, without any need to mention Taiwan separately, according to state media outlet China Daily.

Beijing states that the Cairo Declaration and the Potsdam Proclamation affirmed Taiwan's return to China, while acknowledging that the 1951 San Francisco Peace Treaty did not explicitly address Taiwan's sovereignty. Chinese diplomats criticised the United States for disregarding the Cairo Declaration and the Potsdam Proclamation in which they believed that the United States had agreed on the return of Taiwan to China. The Chinese government also claims that it reached a consensus with Taiwan in 1992, in which both China and Taiwan agreed that there is but one China across the Taiwan strait. China set this consensus as a premise for any official interaction with Taiwan.

The PRC has a long-standing policy that states cannot simultaneously have diplomatic relations with it and Taiwan, on the basis of the one-China principle. The number of states with relations to the Republic of China has declined over time as states switched recognition to the People's Republic. In early 2024, Nauru was the first country to cite Resolution 2758 as a reason for cutting its diplomatic ties with Taiwan and establishing relations with China. The official Xinhua News Agency noted that China established diplomatic ties with 183 countries on the condition of its one-China principle.

On 7 March 2025, at a press conference on the sidelines of the Two Sessions of the 14th National People's Congress, Foreign Minister of China Wang Yi stated that Taiwan can only be referred to as "Taiwan, Province of China" and the resolution settled the matter of China's representation and entirely ruled out the prospect of "two Chinas" or "one China, one Taiwan."

On September 30, 2025, the Chinese Ministry of Foreign Affairs released a paper stating China's position on the United Nations General Assembly Resolution 2758.

=== Republic of China (Taiwan) ===
In 2000, the ROC foreign minister Tien Hung-mao addressed to the Legislative Yuan that the Republic of China was a founding member of the United Nations, yet Resolution 2758, which addressed the representation of the people of the Mainland Area, excluded the representation of the people of the Taiwan Area, a situation he found inappropriate. Tien noted that if Taiwan seeks to join the UN as a new member, its application would likely face a veto from China and objections from other UN Security Council members. Alternatively, if Taiwan aims to rejoin the UN, it must overturn Resolution 2758, which requires a two-thirds majority vote in the UN General Assembly—a highly challenging objective to achieve.

The Pan-Green Coalition, led by the Democratic Progressive Party (DPP), believes that Resolution 2758 has been distorted by China and aim to return to the UN as Taiwan, while the Kuomintang (KMT)-led Pan-Blue Coalition is against the resolution itself and aims to amend the resolution to allow the Republic of China to return to the UN. The two camps are also divided on whether there is a consensus in 1992. President Ma Ying-jeou from KMT accepted this consensus during his administration, while the consensus was later denied by President Tsai Ing-wen from the DPP who questioned whether such consensus ever actually taken place in the meetings. However, Ma stated that "The Republic of China is a sovereign country, and mainland China is part of our territory according to the Constitution. Therefore, our relations with the mainland are not international relations. It is a special relationship".

The Resolution has been criticized as illegal by the Republic of China government, since expulsion of a member requires the recommendation of the Security Council and can only occur if a nation "has persistently violated the Principles contained in the present Charter," according to Article 6. As the Government Information Office of the Republic of China asserts:

So flawed is this Resolution that only its effective repeal by the General Assembly can provide any hope of expunging the stain on the U.N.'s escutcheon in the international system. Taiwan partially adopted this strategy, and attempted to begin a debate on the repeal of Resolution 2758 during the Fifty-Second General Assembly. Although turned aside in 1997 by the P.R.C.'s energetic diplomatic lobbying, the issue of the R.O.C.'s status at the U.N. will not disappear.

Attempts were made to get a review of Resolution 2758 onto the agenda with a proposal in 1998 noting that "as to its return to the United Nations, the Government has made it clear that it no longer claims to represent all of China, but that it seeks representation only for its 21.8 million people". Actions by the ROC government under its "Taiwan-independence" leaning president, Chen Shui-ban, to apply for membership under the name "Taiwan" highlighted this intention. Then in 2008, Two referendums were held to determine whether the country should re-join the UN as the Republic of China or join the UN as Taiwan. Both referendums failed to meet the required voter turnout. A United States Department of State spokesman warned such referendums may alter the status quo of Taiwan, breaking the promises that Chen made to President George W. Bush. Since 2009, Taiwan has not submitted requests for UN membership, but continues to protest its exclusion from the UN system through other countries. However, the KMT administration of Ma Ying-jeou had dropped attempts to become a UN member state.

In September 2024, Ministry of Foreign Affairs of the ROC announced an intention by the Taiwanese government to challenge the "distortion and misuse of United Nations General Assembly Resolution 2758" with the goal of rejoining the UN. Several DPP legislators urged the Legislative Yuan to declare that Resolution 2758 does not concern Taiwan's sovereignty or international status. The DPP legislators attempted to make an interim motion, which was, however, ignored by the president of the Legislative Yuan, Han Kuo-yu from the KMT, throughout the parliamentary session.

=== United States ===
The US's official policy is to recognize the PRC government as "the sole legal government of China", and "it acknowledged the Chinese position that there is but one China and Taiwan is part of China". According to a 2014 Congressional Research Service (CRS) report, the US administrations have not explicitly stated a position on the political status of Taiwan.

In April 2024, US State Department Deputy Assistant Secretary Mark Lambert spoke at a German Marshall Fund (GMF) seminar, saying that "Resolution 2758 does not endorse, is not equivalent to, and does not reflect a consensus for the PRC's 'one China' principle". Lambert added that the Chinese government "mischaracterizes the resolution by falsely conflating it with China’s ‘one China’ principle and wrongly asserts that it reflects an international consensus for its ‘one China’ principle." In May 2024, State Department spokesman Matthew Miller said that the US's 'one China' policy "has not changed".

According to some analysts at the GMF, Resolution 2758 solved the issue of "China's representation" in the United Nations—but it left the issue of Taiwan's representation unresolved.

While keeping diplomatic relations with the PRC, the US expects that "the future of Taiwan will be determined by peaceful means". The US "would continue to maintain cultural, commercial, and other unofficial relations with the people of Taiwan". In February 2025, a group of U.S. congressional representatives introduced a non-binding resolution that rejected the PRC's use of Resolution 2758, which it stated had been "weaponized." In April 2025, the Indiana House of Representatives passed a resolution supporting Taiwan and opposing any "distortion or misuse" of Resolution 2758.

=== Other interpretations ===
In July 2024, at the first Inter-Parliamentary Alliance on China summit in Taiwan, attending lawmakers agreed on a resolution to counter China's interpretation of Resolution 2758 in their home country legislatures.

In August 2024, the Parliament of Australia formally condemned China's use of UN Resolution 2758. The parliament declared that UN Resolution 2758, "does not establish the People’s Republic of China's sovereignty over Taiwan and does not determine the future status of Taiwan in the UN".

In September 2024, the Dutch House of Representatives recognized that UN Resolution 2758 does not judge Taiwan's future participation in the UN or other international organizations, and also does not support China's claim of sovereignty over Taiwan. The vote of 147 to 3 rejects China's interpretation of the resolution in its claims over Taiwan and calls for an EU-wide effort to support Taiwan's representation. The House of Representatives passed a similar resolution in September 2025.

In October 2024, the European Parliament recognized that Resolution 2758 does not take a position on Taiwan, has no bearing on Taiwan's participation in UN bodies, and that China's coercive measure to achieve unification are contradictory to international law. The European Commission stated that it opposes "any unilateral actions that change the status quo by force or coercion." In April 2025, the European Parliament said in a report that China has attempted to distort Resolution 2758 to impede Taiwan's participation in international bodies.

In November 2024, the House of Commons of Canada unanimously passed a motion stating that Resolution 2758 did not establish Chinese sovereignty over Taiwan and had no bearing on Taiwan's future participation in UN bodies.

In November 2024, the House of Commons of the United Kingdom unanimously passed a motion stating that Resolution 2758 does not address the political status of Taiwan, does not establish PRC sovereignty over Taiwan, and is silent on Taiwan's participation in UN bodies.

In March 2025, the Belgian Chamber of Representatives unanimously passed a resolution stating that Resolution 2758 does not take a position on Taiwan.

== See also ==
- China and the United Nations
- Taiwan and the United Nations
- United Nations General Assembly resolution
- United Nations General Assembly Resolution 505
