= United Nations General Assembly Resolution 1668 (XVI) =

1961 UN resolution on the representation of China

United Nations General Assembly Resolution 1668 (XVI) was an act of the UN General Assembly that deemed the issue of Chinese representation at the UN an "important question" under the UN Charter; therefore any proposal to change of recognition either to the People's Republic of China from the Republic of China and designated as such as the representation of all of China at the UN would hence require a two-thirds majority of all voting members. The impetus for UN Resolution 1668 (1961) was raised by Australia, Colombia, Italy, Japan, and the United States and passed with 61 UN Member States voting in its favor, 34 UN Member States voted against it, 7 UN Member States abstaining, and 2 UN Member States non-voting. The Vienna Convention on Diplomatic Relations was signed by the Republic of China on 18 April 1961 and ratified on 19 December 1969. The Vienna Convention on Diplomatic Relations is the cornerstone of modern-day diplomacy since the Vienna Congress and followed by the UN.

== Representation of China in the United Nations ==
The General Assembly,

Noting that a serious divergence of views exists among Member States concerning the representation of a founder Member who is named in the Charter of the United Nations,

Recalling that this matter has been described repeatedly in the General Assembly by all segments of opinion as vital and crucial and that on numerous occasions its inclusion in the agenda has been requested under rule 15 of the Assembly's rules of procedure as an item of an important and urgent character,

Recalling further the recommendation contained in its resolution 396 (V) of 14 December 1950 that, whenever more than one authority claims to be the government entitled to represent a Member State in the United Nations and this question becomes the subject of controversy in the United Nations, the question should be considered in the light of the purposes and principles of the Charter and the circumstances of each case,

Decides, in accordance with Article 18 of the Charter of the United Nations, that any proposal to change the representation of China is an important question.

1080th plenary meeting,
15 December 1961

== See also ==
- United Nations General Assembly Resolution 505
