= Seventy-third session of the United Nations General Assembly =

73rd United Nations Assembly

- 18 September 2018 – 17 September 2019 73rd session 73rd general debate
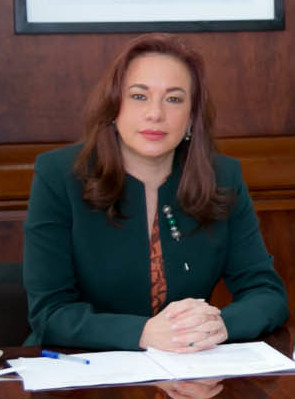
- President of the 73rd General Assembly; María Fernanda Espinosa Garcés
- Host country: United Nations
- Cities: New York City
- Venues: General Assembly Hall at the United Nations Headquarters
- Participants: Member States of the United Nations
- Secretary-General: António Guterres
- Website: www.un.org/en/ga/

The Seventy-third session of the United Nations General Assembly was opened on 18 September 2018. The President of the United Nations General Assembly was from the GRULAC group.

== Organisation for the session ==
=== President ===
Ecuadorian Foreign Minister, María Fernanda Espinosa Garcés was elected as President of the General Assembly on 5 June 2018.

=== Vice-Presidents ===
There were twenty-one vice-presidents for the 73rd Session. They were:

The five permanent members of the Security Council:

- China
- France
- Russian Federation
- United Kingdom of Great Britain and Northern Ireland
- United States of America

As well as the following nations:

- Algeria
- Burkina Faso
- Cambodia
- Cyprus
- Democratic Republic of the Congo
- Gambia (Republic of The)
- Guyana
- Iraq
- Japan
- Namibia
- Panama
- Qatar
- San Marino
- Spain
- Sudan
- Ukraine

=== Committees ===
The following were elected as Chairs and officers of the General Assembly committees for the 73rd Session:

First Committee (Disarmament and International Security)

Name	Country	Position
H.E. Mr. Ion Jinga	Romania	Chairperson
Ms. Marissa Edwards	Guyana	Vice-chair
Mr. Noël Diarra	Mali	Vice-chair
Mr. José Ataíde Amaral	Portugal	Vice-chair
Ms. Muna Zawani Md Idris	Brunei Darussalam	Rapporteur

Second Committee (Economic and Financial)

Name	Country	Position
H.E. Mr. Jorge Skinner-Kleé Arenales	Guatemala	Chairperson
Mr. Mehdi Remaoun	Algeria	Vice-chair
Ms. Hessa Muneer Mohammed Rashed AlAteibi	United Arab Emirates	Vice-chair
Mr. Cedric Braquetti	Monaco	Vice-chair
Ms. Anneli Lepp	Estonia	Rapporteur

Third Committee (Social, Humanitarian and Cultural)

Name	Country	Position
H.E. Mr. Mahmoud Saikal	Afghanistan	Chairperson
Ms. Lahya Itedhimbwa Shikongo	Namibia	Vice-chair
Mr. Martin Kováčik	Slovakia	Vice-chair
Mr. Andrés Molina Linares	Guatemala	Vice-chair
Ms. Katharina Konzett-Stoffl	Austria	Rapporteur

Fourth Committee (Special Political and Decolonization)

Name	Country	Position
H.E. Mr. Lewis Garseedah Brown II	Liberia	Chairperson
Mr. Faisal Nasser M. Alhakbani	Saudi Arabia	Vice-chair
Mr. Dániel Goldea	Hungary	Vice-chair
Mr. Michael O'Toole	Ireland	Vice-chair
Mr. Luis Mauricio Arancibia Fernández	Bolivia (Plurinational State of)	Rapporteur

Fifth Committee (Administrative and Budgetary)

Name	Country	Position
H.E. Ms. GiIlian Bird	Australia	Chairperson
Mr. Fabio Esteban Pedraza-Torres	Colombia	Vice-chair
Mr. Andre Lipand	Estonia	Vice-chair
Mr. Haseeb Gohar	Pakistan	Vice-chair
Mr. Hicham Oussihamou	Morocco	Rapporteur

Sixth Committee (Legal)

Name	Country	Position
H.E. Mr. Michel Xavier Biang	Gabon	Chairperson
Ms. Maria Angela Ponce	Philippines	Vice-chair
Ms. Barbara Kremžar	Slovenia	Vice-chair
Mr. Patrick Luna	Brazil	Vice-chair
Ms. Nadia Alexandra Kalb	Austria	Rapporteur

=== Seat Allocation ===
As is tradition during each session of the General Assembly, Secretary-General António Guterres drew lots to see which member state would take the helm at the first seat in the General Assembly Chamber, with the other member states following according to the English translation of their name, the same order would be followed in the six main committees. For this session, Mali was chosen to take the first seat of the General Assembly Chamber.

=== General Debate ===
Most states had a representative speaking about issues concerning their country and the hopes for the coming year as to what the UNGA will do. This was an opportunity for the member states to opine on international issues of their concern. The General Debate occurred from 25 September to 1 October 2018, with the exception of the intervening Sunday. The theme for that year's debate was chosen by President María Fernanda Espinosa as "Making the United Nations relevant to all people: Global leadership and shared responsibilities for peaceful, equitable and sustainable societies".

The order of speakers was given first to member states, then observer states and supranational bodies. Any other observers entities had a chance to speak at the end of the debate, if they so choose. Speakers were put on the list in the order of their request, with special consideration for ministers and other government officials of similar or higher rank. According to the rules in place for the General Debate, the statements should be in one of the United Nations official languages of Arabic, Chinese, English, French, Russian or Spanish, and will be translated by the United Nations translators. Each speaker is requested to provide 20 advance copies of their statements to the conference officers to facilitate translation and to be presented at the podium. Speeches are requested to be limited to five minutes, with seven minutes for supranational bodies.

Foreign ministers and high representatives participating in the General Debate signed the Code of Conduct Towards Achieving a World Free of Terrorism. The Code of Conduct was the brainchild of Kazakhstan's President Nursultan Nazarbayev. The main goal of the document is implementation of a wide range of international commitments to counter terrorism and establishing a broad global coalition towards achieving a world free of terrorism by 2045.

== Resolutions ==
The following are resolutions the General Assembly has passed in its 73rd session, as of 3 December 2018.

Resolution	Date	Plenary or Committee	Agenda Item	Vote	Passed	Topic
A/RES/73/1	24 September 2018	Plen.	66	No Vote	Yes	Political declaration adopted at the Nelson Mandela Peace Summit
A/RES/73/2	10 October 2018	Plen.	119	No Vote	Yes	Political declaration of the third high-level meeting of the General Assembly on the prevention and control of non-communicable diseases
A/RES/73/3	10 October 2018	Plen.	129	No Vote	Yes	Political declaration of the high-level meeting of the General Assembly on the fight against tuberculosis
A/RES/73/4	12 October 2018	C.5	140	No Vote	Yes	Scale of assessments for the apportionment of the expenses of the United Nations: requests under Article 19 of the Charter
A/RES/73/5	16 October 2018	Plen.	125	146-3-15	Yes	Chair of the Group of 77 for 2019
A/C.1/73/X	26 October 2018	Plen.	This draft resolution was not formally introduced	31-55-54	No	Preservation of and compliance with the Intermediate-Range Nuclear Forces Treaty
A/RES/73/6	26 October 2018	Plen.	30	No Vote	Yes	Fiftieth anniversary of the first United Nations Conference on the Exploration and Peaceful Uses of Outer Space: space as a driver of sustainable development
A/RES/73/7	29 October 2018	Plen.	77	No Vote	yes	Report of the International Criminal Court
A/RES/73/8	1 November 2018	Plen.	43	189-2-0	Yes	Necessity of ending the economic, commercial and financial embargo imposed by the United States of America against Cuba
A/RES/73/9	9 November 2018	Plen.	92	No Vote	Yes	Report of the International Atomic Energy Agency
A/RES/73/10	26 November 2018	Plen.	128 (u)	No Vote	Yes	Cooperation between the United Nations and the Central European Initiative
A/RES/73/11	26 November 2018	Plen.	128 (y)	No Vote	Yes	Cooperation between the United Nations and the International Criminal Police Organization (INTERPOL)
A/RES/73/12	26 November 2018	Plen.	128 (k)	No Vote	Yes	Cooperation between the United Nations and the Preparatory Commission for the Comprehensive Nuclear-Test-Ban Treaty Organization
A/RES/73/13	26 November 2018	Plen.	128 (o)	No Vote	Yes	Cooperation between the United Nations and the Black Sea Economic Cooperation Organization
A/RES/73/14	26 November 2018	Plen.	128 (v)	No Vote	Yes	Cooperation between the United Nations and the Organization for Democracy and Economic Development - GUAM
A/RES/73/15	26 November 2018	Plen.	128 (l)	No Vote	Yes	Cooperation between the United Nations and the Council of Europe
A/RES/73/16	26 November 2018	Plen.	128 (w)	No Vote	Yes	Cooperation between the United Nations and the Commonwealth of Independent States
A/RES/73/17	26 November 2018	Plen.	133	No Vote	Yes	Impact of rapid technological change on the achievement of the Sustainable Development Goals and targets
A/RES/73/18	30 November 2018	Plen.	39	100-12-62	Yes	Committee on the Exercise of the Inalienable Rights of the Palestinian People
A/RES/73/19	30 November 2018	Plen.	39	156-8-12	Yes	Peaceful settlement of the question of Palestine
A/RES/73/20	30 November 2018	Plen.	39	152-8-14	Yes	Special information programme on the question of Palestine of the Department of Public Information of the Secretariat
A/RES/73/21	30 November 2018	Plen.	39	96-13-64	Yes	Division for Palestinian Rights of the Secretariat
A/RES/73/22	30 November 2018	Plen.	38	148-11-14	Yes	Jerusalem
A/RES/73/23	30 November 2018	Plen.	38	99-10-66	Yes	The Syrian Golan
A/RES/73/24	3 December 2018	Plen.	12	No Vote	Yes	Sport as an enabler of sustainable development
A/RES/73/25	3 December 2018	Plen.	14	No Vote	Yes	International Day of Education
A/RES/73/165	17 December 2018	Plen.	14	No Vote	Yes	United Nations Declaration on the Rights of Peasants

== See also ==
- List of UN General Assembly sessions
- List of General debates of the United Nations General Assembly
