= Eightieth session of the United Nations General Assembly =

Session of UNGA which runs from 2025 to 2026

- 9 September 2025 – 8 September 2026 80th session 80th general debate

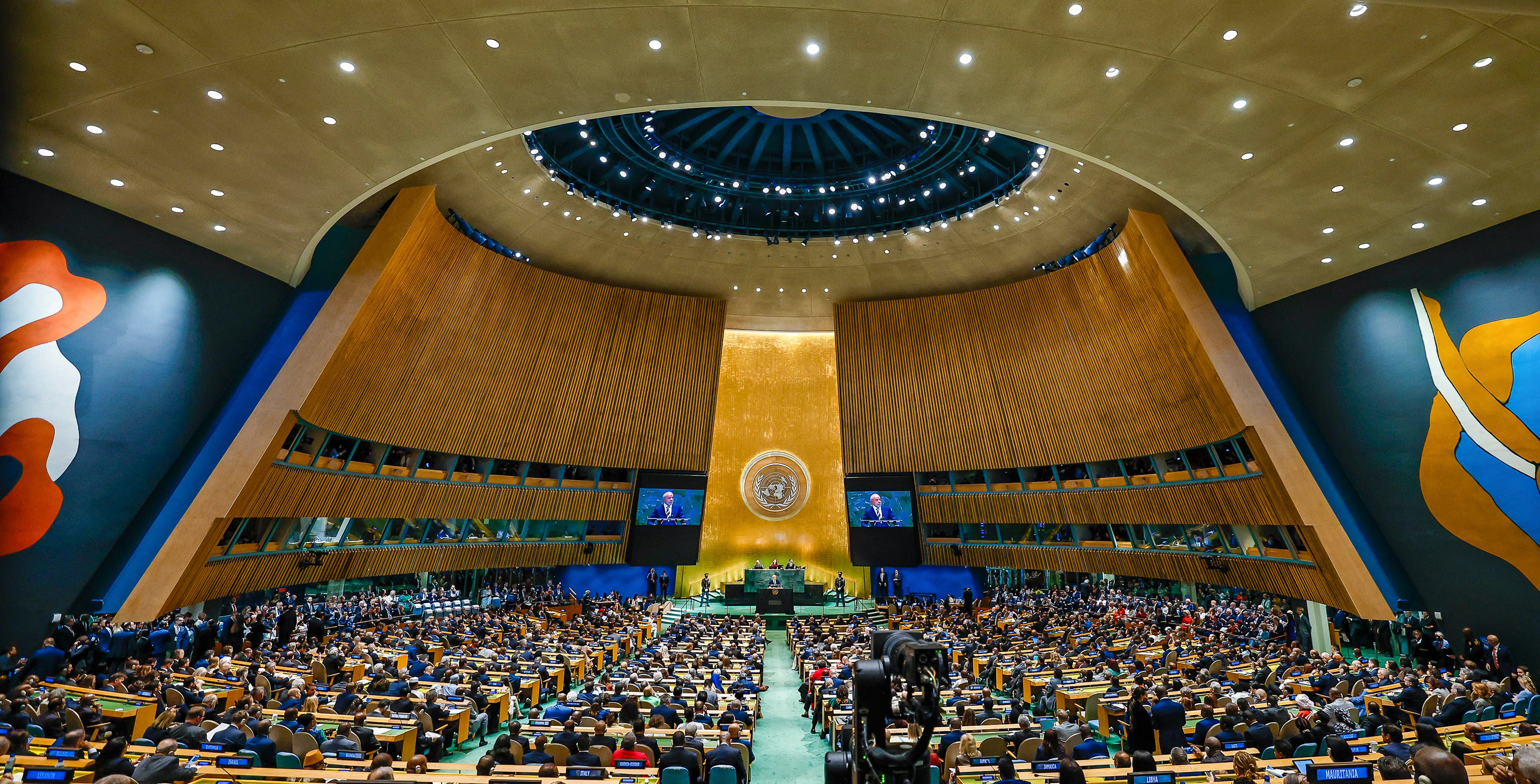
- Host country: United Nations
- City: New York City, United States
- Venue: General Assembly Hall at the United Nations Headquarters
- President: Annalena Baerbock
- Secretary-General: António Guterres
- Website: www.un.org/en/ga/

The Eightieth session of the United Nations General Assembly was the session of the United Nations General Assembly that ran from 9 September 2025 to 8 September 2026. The president of the General Assembly was from the Western European and Others Group. (Note: The presidency rotates annually between the five geographic groups: African, Asia-Pacific, Eastern European, Latin American and Caribbean, and Western European and other States.)

== Organisation for the session ==
=== President ===
On 2 June 2025, Germany's former foreign minister Annalena Baerbock was elected to the position of President of the General Assembly.

Results
| Candidates | Home state | Votes | % |
|---|---|---|---|
| Annalena Baerbock | Germany | 167 | 88.830 |
| Helga Schmid | Germany | 7 | 3.723 |
| Total | | 174 | 92.553 |
| Abstentions | | 14 | 7.447 |
| Valid Votes | | 188 | 100.00 |
| Blank and Invalid Votes | | 0 | 0.00 |
| Registered / participation | | 193 | 97.409 |

=== Vice-presidents ===
The General Assembly elected the following countries as the vice-presidents of the 80th session:

The five permanent members of the United Nations Security Council:

- China
- France
- Russia
- United Kingdom
- United States

As well as the following nations:

- Andorra
- Argentina
- Bangladesh
- Cape Verde
- DR Congo
- Kenya
- Lebanon
- Lesotho
- Maldives
- Montenegro
- Saint Kitts and Nevis
- Saudi Arabia
- Senegal
- Timor-Leste
- Tunisia
- Venezuela

=== Committees ===
First Committee (Disarmament and International Security)
| Name | Country | Position |
|---|---|---|
| Maurizio Massari | Italy | Chairperson |
| Amr Essam Eldin Sadek Ahmed | Egypt | Vice-chair |
| Pawinrat Mahaguna | Thailand | Vice-chair |
| Jakub Jaros | Poland | Vice-chair |
| Ana Maricela Ávila Becerril | Costa Rica | Rapporteur |

Second Committee (Economic and Financial)
| Name | Country | Position |
|---|---|---|
| Lamin B. Dibba | Gambia | Chairperson |
| Weronika Garbacz | Poland | Vice-chair |
| Andrés Napuri Pita | Peru | Vice-chair |
| Jenni Mikkola | Finland | Vice-chair |
| Javid Momeni | Iran | Rapporteur |

Third Committee (Social, Humanitarian and Cultural)
| Name | Country | Position |
|---|---|---|
| Cherdchai Chaivaivid | Thailand | Chairperson |
| Glentis Thomas | Antigua and Barbuda | Vice-chair |
| Katarina Andrić | Croatia | Vice-chair |
| Ginevra Oliva | Italy | Vice-chair |
| Edna Stephanie Williams | Ghana | Rapporteur |

Fourth Committee (Special Political and Decolonization)
| Name | Country | Position |
|---|---|---|
| José Alberto Bríz Gutiérrez | Guatemala | Chairperson |
| Josélyne Kwishaka | Burundi | Vice-chair |
| Noel Novicio | Philippines | Vice-chair |
| Raphael Ruppacher | Austria | Vice-chair |
| Dávid Nagy | Hungary | Rapporteur |

Fifth Committee (Administrative and Budgetary)
| Name | Country | Position |
|---|---|---|
| Zsuzsanna Horváth | Hungary | Chairperson |
| Badreldeen Bakhit | Sudan | Vice-chair |
| Mohammad Taghi Amrollahi | Iran | Vice-chair |
| Erik Björk | Sweden | Vice-chair |
| Vadim Belloni | Chile | Rapporteur |

Sixth Committee (Legal)
| Name | Country | Position |
|---|---|---|
| Enrique A. Manalo (Note: The Chairperson of the Sixth Committee was originally elected to be Leila Castillon Lora-Santos from the Philippines, who stepped down from the role. Following this, Enrique A. Manalo was elected to assume the role.) | Philippines | Chairperson |
| Estela Mercedes Nze Mansogo | Equatorial Guinea | Vice-chair |
| Marek Zukal | Czech Republic | Vice-chair |
| Lucía Teresa Solano Ramírez | Colombia | Vice-chair |
| Wieteke Theeuwen | Netherlands | Rapporteur |

=== General debate ===
Each member of the General Assembly will have a representative speaking about issues concerning their country and the hopes for the coming year as to what the UNGA will do. This is an opportunity for the member states to opine on international issues of their concern.

The order of speakers is given first to member states, then observer states and supranational bodies. Any other observers entities will have a chance to speak at the end of the debate, if they so choose. Speakers will be put on the list in the order of their request, with special consideration for ministers and other government officials of similar or higher rank. According to the rules in place for the General Debate, the statements should be in one of the United Nations official languages of Arabic, Chinese, English, French, Russian or Spanish, and will be translated by the United Nations translators. Each speaker is requested to provide 350 advance copies of their statements to the conference officers to facilitate translation and to be presented at the podium.

=== Resolutions and texts adopted ===
On 25 March 2026, the General Assembly adopted the United Nations Declaration of the Trafficking of Enslaved Africans and Racialized Chattel Enslavement of Africans as the Gravest Crime against Humanity.

On 4 September 2026, the General Assembly adopted the resolution "Correct the map": rebalancing global cartographic representation and promoting equitable representation of the world's regions, particularly Africa to promote the Equal Earth projection.

== See also ==
- List of UN General Assembly sessions
- List of General debates of the United Nations General Assembly
- Equal Earth projection
