= Seventy-ninth session of the United Nations General Assembly =

Session of UNGA which runs from 2024 to 2025

- 10 September 2024 – 9 September 2025 79th session 79th general debate
- Host country: United Nations
- Cities: New York City, United States
- Venues: General Assembly Hall at the United Nations Headquarters
- Participants: United Nations Member States
- President: Philémon Yang
- Secretary-General: António Guterres
- Website: www.un.org/en/ga/

The Seventy-ninth session of the United Nations General Assembly was the session of the United Nations General Assembly that ran from 10 September 2024 to 9 September 2025. The president of the General Assembly was from the African Group.

== Organisation for the session ==
=== President ===
On 6 June 2024, the former Prime Minister of Cameroon, Philémon Yang, was elected by acclamation to the position of President of the General Assembly.

=== Vice-Presidents ===
The General Assembly elected the following countries as the vice-presidents of the 79th session:

The five permanent members of the United Nations Security Council:

- China
- France
- Russia
- United Kingdom
- United States

As well as the following nations:

- Algeria
- Angola
- Austria
- Barbados
- Ghana
- Guatemala
- Italy
- Kyrgyzstan
- Madagascar
- Moldova
- Senegal
- Thailand
- Tonga
- Turkmenistan
- Venezuela

=== Committees ===
First Committee (Disarmament and International Security)
Name	Country	Position
Maritza Chan Valverde	Costa Rica	Chairperson
El Hadj Lehbib Mohamedou	Mauritania	Vice-Chair
Abdulrahman Abdulaziz Al-Thani	Qatar	Vice-Chair
Vivica Munkner	Germany	Vice-Chair
Pēteris Filipsons	Latvia	Rapporteur

Second Committee (Economic and Financial)
Name	Country	Position
Muhammad Abdul Muhith	Bangladesh	Chairperson
David Anyaegbu	Nigeria	Vice-Chair
Ivana Vejic	Croatia	Vice-Chair
Gudrun Thorbjoernsdottir	Iceland	Vice-Chair
Stefany Romero Veiga	Uruguay	Rapporteur

Third Committee (Social, Humanitarian and Cultural)
Name	Country	Position
Zéphyrin Maniratanga	Burundi	Chairperson
Nur Azura Abd Karim	Malaysia	Vice-Chair
Ekaterine Lortkipanidze	Georgia	Vice-Chair
Mayra Lisseth Sorto Rosales	El Salvador	Vice-Chair
Mark Reichwein	Netherlands	Rapporteur

Fourth Committee (Special Political and Decolonization)
Name	Country	Position
Sanita Pavļuta-Deslandes	Latvia	Chairperson
Sheikh Jassim Abdulaziz J. A. Al-Thani	Qatar	Vice-Chair
Carmen Rosa Rios	Bolivia	Vice-Chair
Hussein Hirji	Canada	Vice-Chair
Makarabo Moloeli	Lesotho	Rapporteur

Fifth Committee (Administrative and Budgetary)
Name	Country	Position
Egriselda Aracely González López	El Salvador	Chairperson
Surat Suwannikkha	Thailand	Vice-Chair
Szymon Mateusz Pekala	Poland	Vice-Chair
Johanna Bischof	Austria	Vice-Chair
Elaye-Djibril Yacin Abdillahi	Djibouti	Rapporteur

Sixth Committee (Legal)
Name	Country	Position
Rui Vinhas	Portugal	Chairperson
Ammar Mohammed Mahmoud Mohammed	Sudan	Vice-Chair
Matúš Košuth	Slovakia	Vice-Chair
Ligia Lorena Flores Soto	El Salvador	Vice-Chair
Yong-Ern Nathaniel Khng	Singapore	Rapporteur

=== General debate ===
Each member of the General Assembly had a representative speaking about issues concerning their country and the hopes for the coming year as to what the UNGA would do. This is an opportunity for the member states to opine on international issues of their concern.

The order of speakers is given first to member states, then observer states and supranational bodies. Any other observers entities have a chance to speak at the end of the debate, if they so choose. Speakers will be put on the list in the order of their request, with special consideration for ministers and other government officials of similar or higher rank. According to the rules in place for the General Debate, the statements should be in of the United Nations official languages of Arabic, Chinese, English, French, Russian or Spanish, and is translated by the United Nations translators. Each speaker is requested to provide 350 advance copies of their statements to the conference officers to facilitate translation and to be presented at the podium.

== See also ==
- List of UN General Assembly sessions
- List of General debates of the United Nations General Assembly
