= Seventy-sixth session of the United Nations General Assembly =

Session of UNGA which runs from 2021 to 2022

- 14 September 2021 – 13 September 2022 76th session 76th general debate
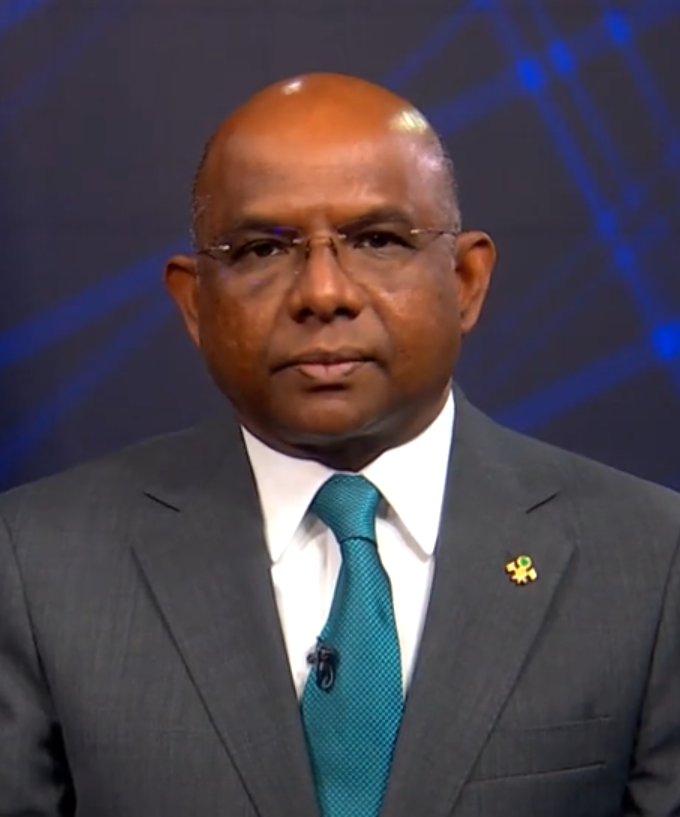
- President of the 76th General Assembly, Abdulla Shahid
- Host country: United Nations
- Cities: New York City, United States
- Venues: General Assembly Hall at the United Nations Headquarters
- Participants: United Nations Member States
- President: Abdulla Shahid
- Secretary-General: António Guterres
- Website: www.un.org/eng/ga

The Seventy-sixth session of the United Nations General Assembly was the session of the United Nations General Assembly which ran from 14 September 2021 to 13 September 2022. The President of the UN General Assembly is from the Asia-Pacific Group.

== Organisation for the session ==
=== President ===
On 7 June 2021, Maldivian politician and diplomat, and current Minister of Foreign Affairs, Abdulla Shahid was elected to the position of President of the General Assembly.

In his vision statement, Shahid laid out some of his priorities for the session: specifically, a stronger and more effective United Nations to inspire unity and solidarity, and above all hope. His "Five Rays of Hope" include recovering from COVID-19, rebuilding sustainably, responding to the needs of the planet, respecting the rights of all and revitalising the UN. He also pledged that his team would be gender-balanced, multi-national and geographically diverse. Finally, he pledged to uphold the rules of procedure of the General Assembly for him, his team and the entire Assembly.

=== Vice-Presidents ===
The General Assembly elected the following countries as the vice-presidents of the 76th session:

The five permanent members of the Security Council:

- China
- France
- Russia
- United Kingdom of Great Britain and Northern Ireland
- United States of America

As well as the following nations:

- Bangladesh
- Belgium
- Côte d’Ivoire
- Dominican Republic
- Egypt
- Equatorial Guinea
- Finland
- Kuwait
- Lao People's Democratic Republic
- Mozambique
- Philippines
- Sierra Leone
- Slovenia
- United Republic of Tanzania
- Vacant, Latin American and Caribbean Group
- Vacant, Latin American and Caribbean Group

=== Committees ===
The following were elected Chairs and Officers of the General Assembly's Main Committees for the 76th Session:

First Committee (Disarmament and International Security)
Name	Country	Position
H.E. Omar Hilale	Morocco	Chair
Vacant, Latin American and Caribbean Group		Vice-chair
Amir Hamzah Mohd Nasir	Malaysia	Vice-chair
Saša Milanović	Bosnia and Herzegovina	Vice-chair
Sanna Leena Orava	Finland	Rapporteur

Fourth Committee (Special Political and Decolonization)
Name	Country	Position
H.E. Egriselda Aracely González López	El Salvador	Chair
Angelito Ayong	Philippines	Vice-chair
Lukáš Peter Prvý	Slovakia	Vice-chair
Matthew Edbrooke	Liechtenstein	Vice-chair
Youssouf Aden Moussa	Djibouti	Rapporteur

Second Committee (Economic and Financial)
Name	Country	Position
H.E. Vanessa Frazier	Malta	Chair
Nadja Micael	Eritrea	Vice-chair
Karolina Krywulak	Poland	Vice-chair
Claudia Larue	Dominican Republic	Vice-chair
Prathma Uprety	Nepal	Rapporteur

Third Committee (Social, Humanitarian & Cultural Issues)
Name	Country	Position
Mohamed Siad Doualeh	Djibouti	Chair
Joongil Shin	Republic of Korea	Vice-chair
Devita Abraham	Trinidad and Tobago	Vice-chair
Hanne Carlé	Belgium	Vice-chair
Maria‑Iuliana Niculae	Romania	Rapporteur

Fifth Committee (Administrative and Budgetary Committee)
Name	Country	Position
H.E. Mher Margaryan	Armenia	Chair
Ahmed Mohamed Ismail Elmahs	Egypt	Vice-chair
Mike Ammann	Switzerland	Vice-chair
Mohammed Abdulaziz Alateek	Saudi Arabia	Vice-chair
Megayla Austin	Guyana	Rapporteur

Sixth Committee (Legal)
Name	Country	Position
H.E. Alya Ahmed bin Saif al-Thani	Qatar	Chair
Ahmed Abdelaziz	Egypt	Vice-chair
Justina Krutulyté	Lithuania	Vice-chair
Ricardo García López	Spain	Vice-chair
Ana L. Villalobos	Costa Rica	Rapporteur

=== Seat allocation ===
As is tradition before each session of the General Assembly, the Secretary-General drew lots to see which member state would occupy the first seat in the General Assembly Chamber, with the other member states following according to the English translation of their name. For the 76th Session, Suriname was selected to sit in the first seat by Secretary-General António Guterres. This same order is followed in the six main committees, as well as other United Nations bodies.

=== Agenda ===
The agenda for the 76th session, was approved by the General Committee prior to the opening of the Session.

=== General debate ===
Each member of the General Assembly had a representative speaking about issues concerning their country and the hopes for the coming year as to what the UNGA would do. This is an opportunity for the member states to opine on international issues of their concern.

The order of speakers is given first to member states, then observer states and supranational bodies. Any other observing entities have a chance to speak at the end of the debate, if they so choose. Speakers will be put on the list in the order of their request, with special consideration for ministers and other government officials of similar or higher rank. According to the rules in place for the General Debate, the statements should be made in any of the United Nations' official languages, namely Arabic, Chinese, English, French, Russian or Spanish, and will be translated by the United Nations Interpretation Service. Each speaker is requested to provide 350 advance copies of their statements to the conference officers to facilitate translation and to be presented at the podium.

== See also ==
- List of UN General Assembly sessions
- List of General debates of the United Nations General Assembly
