= Eighty-first session of the United Nations General Assembly =

2026–2027 UNGA Session

- 8 September 2026 – 7 September 2027 81st session 81st general debate
- Host country: United Nations
- City: New York City, United States
- Venue: General Assembly Hall at the United Nations Headquarters
- Participants: United Nations Member States
- President: Khalilur Rahman
- Secretary-General: António Guterres
- Website: www.un.org/en/ga/

The eighty-first session of the United Nations General Assembly is the current session of the United Nations General Assembly, which began on 8 September 2026. The president of the General Assembly is Khalilur Rahman from the Asia-Pacific Group. (Note: The presidency rotates annually between the five geographic groups: African, Asia-Pacific, Eastern European, Latin American and Caribbean, and Western European and other States.)

== Organisation for the session ==
=== President ===
On 2 June 2026, Bangladesh's Foreign Minister Khalilur Rahman was elected to the position of President of the General Assembly, defeating Cyprus's Special Envoy for Multilateralism, Ambassador Andreas Kakouris. The election was conducted under Rule 30 of the Rules of Procedure in the General Assembly Hall at the United Nations Headquarters in New York. The result was announced by outgoing President Annalena Baerbock in the presence of UN Secretary-General António Guterres. With his election, Bangladesh holds the UNGA presidency for the second time, the first being in 1986–87 when Humayun Rashid Choudhury served as President of the 41st session.

Results
Candidates	Home state	Votes	%
Khalilur Rahman	Bangladesh	99	52.11
Andreas Kakouris	Cyprus	91	47.89
Total		190	100.00
Valid Votes		190	100.00
Blank and Invalid Votes		0	0.00
Registered / participation		193	98.45

=== Vice-presidents ===
The General Assembly elected the following countries as the vice-presidents of the 81st session:

The five permanent members of the United Nations Security Council:

- China
- France
- Russia
- United Kingdom
- United States

As well as the following nations:

- Afghanistan
- Antigua and Barbuda
- Cape Verde
- Dominican Republic
- Egypt
- Eritrea
- Finland
- Gabon
- Guinea-Bissau
- Iraq
- Ireland
- Lebanon
- Mongolia
- Paraguay
- Poland
- Zimbabwe

=== Committees ===
First Committee (Disarmament and International Security)

Name	Country	Position
Lok Bahadur Thapa	Nepal	Chairperson
Faisal Abdelazim Salim Mohamed	Sudan	Vice-chair
Arsen Kotanjyan	Armenia	Vice-chair
Kim Van der Sluis	Netherlands	Rapporteur

Second Committee (Economic and Financial)

Name	Country	Position
Suela Janina	Albania	Chairperson
Hussain Azhaan Mohamed Hussain	Maldives	Vice-chair
Walter José Mira Ramírez	El Salvador	Vice-chair
Robert Bunbury	Canada	Vice-chair
Ivo Miguel Rubio	Angola	Rapporteur

Third Committee (Social, Humanitarian and Cultural)

Name	Country	Position
James Martin Larsen	Australia	Chairperson
Flavia Umulisa	Rwanda	Vice-chair
Jovana Bubanja	Montenegro	Vice-chair
Abosede Hazlewood	Guyana	Vice-chair
Safaa Hijab Yaseen	Iraq	Rapporteur

Fourth Committee (Special Political and Decolonization)

Name	Country	Position
Coly Seck	Senegal	Chairperson
Fahad Mohammad Alajmi	Kuwait	Vice-chair
Deborah Maria Borg	Malta	Vice-chair
Andrei Nicolenco	Moldova	Vice-chair
Matthew Moxey	Bahamas	Rapporteur

Fifth Committee (Administrative and Budgetary)

Name	Country	Position
Ibrahim Folorunsho Jimoh	Nigeria	Chairperson
Pablo Rodríguez	Dominican Republic	Vice-chair
Costantino Tarducci	Italy	Vice-chair
Noelle Tam	Singapore	Vice-chair
Corina Moroi	Moldova	Rapporteur

Sixth Committee (Legal)

Name	Country	Position
Trishala Simantini Persaud	Guyana	Chairperson
Andrii Melnyk	Ukraine	Vice-chair
Mantsho Annastacia Motsepe	South Africa	Vice-chair
Elisa Johanna S. De Raes	Belgium	Vice-chair
Abdulaziz Fadala M. A. Al-Sulaiti	Qatar	Rapporteur

=== General debate ===
Pro-Palestine protesters in Times Square in front of a state sponsored pro-Israel ad on the day of Netanyahu's speech, September 24

A Times Square ad displays a photo of Netanyahu waving, with the text "Welcome Prime Minister Netanyahu", September 24

Protesters march through Manhattan on the day of Netanyahu's speech, September 24

The high-level week of the 81st session of the United Nations General Assembly began in New York on 22 September 2026, continuing through Saturday, 26 September, and concluding on Monday, 28 September 2026. The programme included the general debate as well as high-level meetings on climate action, sea-level rise, pandemic prevention and preparedness, and development issues. Discussions focused on international conflicts, artificial intelligence, humanitarian crises and reform of the international system.

Each member of the General Assembly had a representative speaking about issues concerning their country and the hopes for the coming year as to what the UNGA will do. This was an opportunity for the member states to opine on international issues of their concern.

The order of speakers was given first to member states, then observer states and supranational bodies. Any other observer entities had a chance to speak at the end of the debate, if they chose so . Speakers were put on the list in the order of their request, with special consideration for ministers and other government officials of similar or higher rank. According to the rules in place for the General Debate, the statements had to be in one of the United Nations official languages of Arabic, Chinese, English, French, Russian or Spanish, and will be translated by the United Nations translators. Each speaker was requested to provide 350 advance copies of their statements to the conference officers to facilitate translation and to be presented at the podium.

== See also ==
- List of UN General Assembly sessions
- List of General debates of the United Nations General Assembly
