= General debate of the seventy-sixth session of the United Nations General Assembly =

76th United Nations General Debate Assembly

- 21 – 27 September 2021 76th session 76th general debate

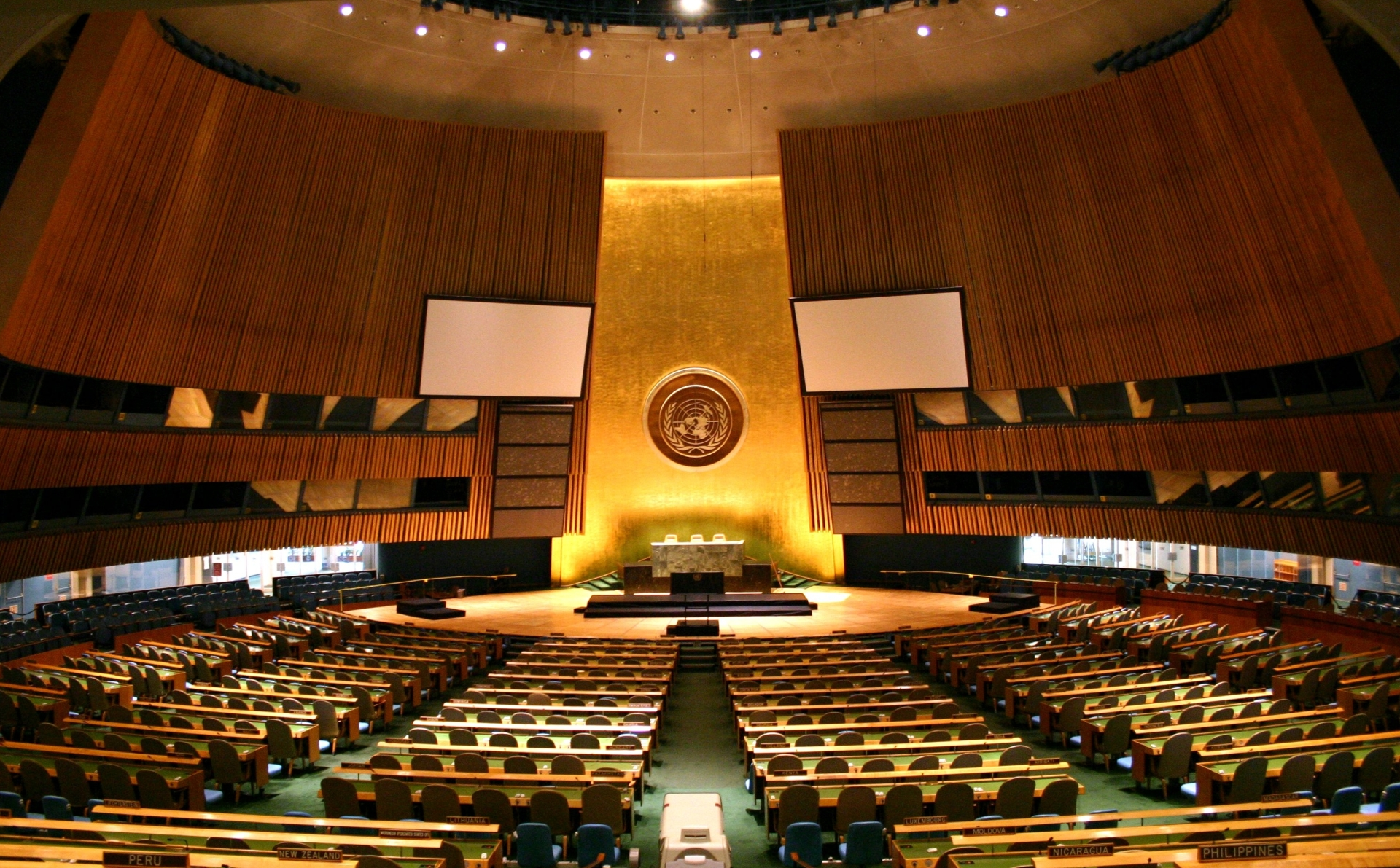
- General Assembly Hall at United Nations Headquarters, New York City
- Host country: United Nations
- Cities: New York City, United States
- Venues: General Assembly Hall at the United Nations Headquarters
- Participants: United Nations Member States
- President: Abdulla Shahid
- Secretary-General: António Guterres
- Website: gadebate.un.org/generaldebate76/en/

The General debate of the seventy-sixth session of the United Nations General Assembly (UNGA) opened on 21 September and ran until 27 September 2021. Leaders from a number of member states addressed the UNGA.

== Organisation and subjects ==
The order of speakers is given first to member states, then observer states and supranational bodies. Any other observer entities will have a chance to speak at the end of the debate, if they so choose. Speakers will be put on the list in the order of their request, with special consideration for ministers and other government officials of similar or higher rank. According to the rules in place for the General Debate, the statements should be in one of the United Nations official languages (Arabic, Chinese, English, French, Russian or Spanish) and will be translated and interpreted by United Nations translators and interpreters. Each speaker is requested to provide 20 advance copies of their statements to the conference officers to facilitate translation and to be presented at the podium. The theme for this year's debate was chosen by President Abdulla Shahid as: "“Building resilience through hope – to recover from COVID-19, rebuild sustainably, respond to the needs of the planet, respect the rights of people and revitalize the United Nations".

== Speaking schedule ==
Since 1955, Brazil and the United States are the first and second countries to speak. Other countries follow according to a speaking schedule issued by the Secretariat.

The list of speakers is provided by both the daily UN Journal, while changes in order are also reflected by the UNGA General Debate website.

=== 21 September ===
==== Morning session ====
- United Nations – Secretary-General António Guterres (Report of the UN Secretary-General)
- United Nations – 76th Session of the United Nations General Assembly - President Abdulla Shahid (Opening statement)
- Brazil – President Jair Bolsonaro
- United States – President Joe Biden (Note: First speech to the UNGA General Debate.)
- Maldives – President Ibrahim Mohamed Solih
- Colombia – President Iván Duque Márquez
- Qatar – Emir Tamim bin Hamad Al Thani
- Slovakia – President Zuzana Čaputová
- Portugal – President Marcelo Rebelo de Sousa
- Kyrgyzstan – President Sadyr Japarov
- Lithuania – President Gitanas Nausėda
- Uzbekistan – President Shavkat Mirziyoyev
- Democratic Republic of the Congo – President Félix Tshisekedi
- Iran – President Ebrahim Raisi
- Chile – President Sebastián Piñera
- South Korea – President Moon Jae-in
- Turkey – President Recep Tayyip Erdoğan
- Switzerland – President Guy Parmelin
- China – General Secretary and President Xi Jinping

==== Evening session ====
- Croatia – President Zoran Milanović
- Egypt – President Abdel Fattah el-Sisi
- Peru – President Pedro Castillo
- Turkmenistan – President Gurbanguly Berdimuhamedow
- Finland – President Sauli Niinistö
- Philippines – President Rodrigo Duterte
- Rwanda – President Paul Kagame
- Argentina – President Alberto Fernández
- Romania – President Klaus Iohannis
- Palau – President Surangel Whipps Jr.
- Costa Rica – President Carlos Alvarado Quesada
- Poland – President Andrzej Duda
- Ecuador – President Guillermo Lasso
- Latvia – President Egils Levits
- Bulgaria – President Rumen Radev
- Zambia – President Hakainde Hichilema
- Central African Republic – President Faustin-Archange Touadéra
- Somalia – President Mohamed Abdullahi Mohamed

=== 22 September ===
==== Morning session ====
- Bosnia and Herzegovina – Chairman of the Presidency Željko Komšić
- Jordan – King Abdullah II
- Madagascar – President Andry Rajoelina
- Ghana – President Nana Akufo-Addo
- Sri Lanka – President Gotabaya Rajapaksa
- Saudi Arabia – King Salman bin Abdulaziz
- Guatemala – President Alejandro Giammattei
- Marshall Islands – President David Kabua
- Moldova – President Maia Sandu
- Uruguay – President Luis Lacalle Pou
- Estonia – President Kersti Kaljulaid
- Suriname – President Chan Santokhi
- Sierra Leone – President Julius Maada Bio

==== Evening session ====
- Venezuela – President Nicolás Maduro
- Mongolia – President Ukhnaagiin Khürelsükh
- Kenya – President Uhuru Kenyatta
- Honduras – President Juan Orlando Hernández
- Indonesia – President Joko Widodo
- Ukraine – President Volodymyr Zelenskyy
- Malawi – President Lazarus Chakwera
- Cape Verde – President Jorge Carlos Fonseca
- Vietnam – President Nguyễn Xuân Phúc
- Togo – President Faure Gnassingbé
- Dominican Republic – President Luis Abinader
- Guinea-Bissau – President Umaro Sissoco Embaló
- Djibouti – President Ismaïl Omar Guelleh
- Kazakhstan – President Kassym-Jomart Tokayev
- Spain – Prime Minister Pedro Sánchez
- Norway – Prime Minister Erna Solberg
- United Kingdom – Prime Minister Boris Johnson

=== 23 September ===
==== Morning session ====
- South Africa – President Cyril Ramaphosa
- Guyana – President Irfaan Ali
- Botswana – President Mokgweetsi Masisi
- Cuba – First Secretary and President Miguel Díaz-Canel
- Angola – President João Lourenço
- Burkina Faso – President Roch Marc Christian Kaboré
- Panama – President Laurentino Cortizo
- Montenegro – President Milo Đukanović
- Namibia – President Hage Geingob
- North Macedonia – President Stevo Pendarovski
- Nauru – President Lionel Aingimea
- Zimbabwe – President Emmerson Mnangagwa
- Chad – Chairman of the Transitional Military Council Mahamat Déby
- Comoros – President Azali Assoumani
- Gabon – President Ali Bongo Ondimba
- Tanzania – President Samia Suluhu Hassan
- Liberia – President George Weah
- Iraq – President Barham Salih

==== Evening session ====
- Federated States of Micronesia – President David Panuelo
- Burundi – President Évariste Ndayishimiye
- Bolivia – President Luis Arce
- El Salvador – President Nayib Bukele
- Tajikistan – President Emomali Rahmon
- Uganda – President Yoweri Museveni
- Azerbaijan – President Ilham Aliyev
- Libya – Chairman of the Presidential Council Mohamed al-Menfi
- Monaco – Prince Albert II
- Equatorial Guinea – President Teodoro Obiang Nguema Mbasogo
- Kiribati – President Taneti Maamau
- Seychelles – President Wavel Ramkalawan
- Lesotho – Prime Minister Moeketsi Majoro
- Italy – Prime Minister Mario Draghi
- Czech Republic – Minister of Foreign Affairs Jakub Kulhánek
- Austria – Minister of Foreign Affairs Alexander Schallenberg
- Mexico – Secretary of Foreign Affairs Marcelo Ebrard
- Hungary – Minister of Foreign Affairs and Trade Péter Szijjártó

=== 24 September ===
==== Morning session ====
- Cyprus – President Nicos Anastasiades
- Nigeria – President Muhammadu Buhari
- Lebanon – President Michel Aoun
- Senegal – President Macky Sall
- Germany – President Frank-Walter Steinmeier
- Slovenia – President Borut Pahor
- Paraguay – President Mario Abdo Benítez
- Palestine – President Mahmoud Abbas
- European Union – President of the European Council Charles Michel
- Gambia – Vice President Isatou Touray
- Benin – Vice President Mariam Chabi Talata
- South Sudan – Fourth Vice President Rebecca Nyandeng De Mabior
- Armenia – Prime Minister Nikol Pashinyan
- Mauritius – Prime Minister Pravind Jugnauth
- Sweden – Prime Minister Stefan Löfven
- Barbados – Prime Minister Mia Mottley
- Bangladesh – Prime Minister Sheikh Hasina
- Netherlands – Prime Minister Mark Rutte
- Greece – Prime Minister Kyriakos Mitsotakis

==== Evening session ====
- Japan – Prime Minister Yoshihide Suga
- Malta – Prime Minister Robert Abela
- Ireland – Taoiseach Micheál Martin
- Albania – Prime Minister Edi Rama
- New Zealand – Prime Minister Jacinda Ardern
- Papua New Guinea – Prime Minister James Marape
- Luxembourg – Prime Minister Xavier Bettel
- Pakistan – Prime Minister Imran Khan
- Georgia – Prime Minister Irakli Garibashvili
- Australia – Prime Minister Scott Morrison
- Kuwait – Prime Minister Sheikh Sabah Al-Khalid Al-Sabah
- Serbia – Prime Minister Ana Brnabić
- Denmark – Prime Minister Mette Frederiksen
- Jamaica – Prime Minister Andrew Holness
- Belize – Prime Minister John Briceño
- Belgium – Prime Minister Alexander De Croo
- Saint Kitts and Nevis – Prime Minister Timothy Harris

=== 25 September ===
==== Morning session ====
- India – Prime Minister Narendra Modi
- Saint Lucia – Prime Minister Philip Joseph Pierre
- Andorra – Prime Minister Xavier Espot
- Eswatini – Prime Minister Cleopas Dlamini
- Saint Vincent and the Grenadines – Prime Minister Ralph Gonsalves
- Haiti – Prime Minister Ariel Henry
- Malaysia – Prime Minister Ismail Sabri Yaakob
- Laos – Prime Minister Phankham Viphavanh
- Sudan – Prime Minister Abdalla Hamdok
- Cambodia – Prime Minister Hun Sen
- Fiji – Prime Minister Frank Bainimarama
- Bhutan – Prime Minister Lotay Tshering
- Thailand – Prime Minister Prayut Chan-o-cha
- Vanuatu – Prime Minister Bob Loughman
- Bahamas – Prime Minister Philip Davis
- Tonga – Prime Minister Pohiva Tuʻiʻonetoa
- Russia – Minister of Foreign Affairs Sergey Lavrov

==== Evening session ====
- Samoa – Prime Minister Fiamē Naomi Mataʻafa
- Tuvalu – Prime Minister Kausea Natano
- Antigua and Barbuda – Prime Minister Gaston Browne
- Solomon Islands – Prime Minister Manasseh Sogavare
- Mali – Prime Minister Choguel Kokalla Maïga
- Holy See – Secretary of State Pietro Parolin
- Ethiopia – Deputy Prime Minister Demeke Mekonnen
- Liechtenstein – Minister of Foreign Affairs Dominique Hasler
- Singapore – Minister of Foreign Affairs Vivian Balakrishnan

=== 27 September ===
==== Morning session ====
- Israel – Prime Minister Naftali Bennett
- Belarus – Minister of Foreign Affairs Vladimir Makei
- Yemen – Minister of Foreign Affairs Ahmad Awad bin Mubarak
- United Arab Emirates – Minister of State for Foreign Affairs Khalifa Shaheen Al Marar
- Syria – Minister of Foreign Affairs Faisal Mekdad
- Iceland – Minister of Foreign Affairs Guðlaugur Þór Þórðarson
- Algeria – Minister of Foreign Affairs Ramtane Lamamra
- Grenada – Minister of Foreign Affairs Oliver Joseph
- Eritrea – Minister of Foreign Affairs Osman Saleh Mohammed
- Bahrain – Minister of Foreign Affairs Abdullatif bin Rashid Al Zayani
- San Marino – Secretary of Foreign Affairs Luca Beccari
- Oman – Minister of Foreign Affairs Badr bin Hamad Al Busaidi
- São Tomé and Príncipe – Minister of Foreign Affairs Edite Tenjua
- Ivory Coast – Minister of Foreign Affairs Kandia Camara
- Brunei – Second Minister of Foreign Affairs Erywan Yusof
- Mauritania – Minister of Foreign Affairs Ismail Ould Cheikh Ahmed
- Niger – Minister of Foreign Affairs Hassoumi Massaoudou
- France – Minister for Europe and Foreign Affairs Jean-Yves Le Drian
- Cameroon – Minister of Foreign Affairs Lejeune Mbella Mbella

==== Evening session ====
- Republic of Congo – Minister of Foreign Affairs Jean-Claude Gakosso
- Dominica – Minister of Foreign Affairs Kenneth Darroux
- Morocco – Minister of Foreign Affairs Nasser Bourita
- Mozambique – Minister of Foreign Affairs Verónica Macamo
- Trinidad and Tobago – Minister of Foreign Affairs Amery Browne
- Tunisia – Minister of Foreign Affairs Othman Jerandi
- Nepal – Minister of Foreign Affairs Narayan Khadka
- Nicaragua – Minister of Foreign Affairs Denis Moncada
- Canada – Minister of Foreign Affairs Marc Garneau
- Guinea – Minister of Foreign Affairs Mamadi Touré
- North Korea – Permanent Representative Kim Song
- East Timor – Permanent Representative Karlito Nunes
- No representatives for Afghanistan and Myanmar were on the agenda of the general debate.

== See also ==
- List of UN General Assembly sessions
- List of General debates of the United Nations General Assembly
