= Special Committee on Peacekeeping Operations =

Peacekeeping committee of the United Nations General Assembly

- Abbreviation: C34
- Formation: 18 February 1965; 61 years ago
- Legal status: Active
- Headquarters: New York, United States
- Head: Chair; Tijjani Muhammad Bande
- Parent organization: United Nations General Assembly

The Member States of the Committee: Full members Observer states

The Special Committee on Peacekeeping Operations of the United Nations, or C34, is a committee of the United Nations General Assembly. It focuses issues relating to peacekeeping.

== History ==
The Special Committee was created on 18 February 1965 by Resolution 2006 (XIX). It was mandated to conduct a comprehensive review of all issues relating to United Nations peacekeeping.

Each year the General Assembly extends in mandate and calls for it to consider any new proposals that work to enhance the capacity of the United Nations to fulfil its responsibilities in the field of peacekeeping.

== Working methods ==
The Committee typically holds a substantive session in New York beginning in February and ending in March. At this session, it reviews progress on its previous proposals, as well as considers new efforts to increase the capacity of the United Nations' peacekeeping operations. At the end of the session, the Committee provides policy recommendations through its Report of the Special Committee on Peacekeeping Operations.

The Committee reports to the General Assembly on its work through the Fourth Committee (Special Political and Decolonization).

== Membership ==
The membership of the Committee is split between full members and observers. The full members are mostly past or current contributors to peacekeeping operations.

=== Full members ===
- Afghanistan
- Albania
- Algeria
- Angola
- Argentina
- Armenia
- Australia
- Austria
- Azerbaijan
- Bangladesh
- Belarus
- Belgium
- Benin
- Bhutan
- Bolivia (Plurinational State of)
- Bosnia and Herzegovina
- Brazil
- Brunei Darussalam
- Bulgaria
- Burkina Faso
- Burundi
- Cambodia
- Cameroon
- Canada
- Central African Republic
- Chad
- Chile
- China
- Colombia
- Congo
- Costa Rica
- Côte D’Ivoire
- Croatia
- Cuba
- Cyprus
- Czech Republic
- DR Congo
- Denmark
- Djibouti
- Dominican Republic
- Ecuador
- Egypt
- El Salvador
- Eritrea
- Estonia
- Eswatini
- Ethiopia
- Fiji
- Finland
- France
- Gabon
- Gambia (Republic of The)
- Georgia
- Germany
- Ghana
- Greece
- Grenada
- Guatemala
- Guinea
- Guyana
- Haiti
- Honduras
- Hungary
- Iceland
- India
- Indonesia
- Iran (Islamic Republic of)
- Iraq
- Ireland
- Israel
- Italy
- Jamaica
- Japan
- Jordan
- Kazakhstan
- Kenya
- Kuwait
- Kyrgyzstan
- Lao People’s Democratic Republic
- Latvia
- Lebanon
- Lesotho
- Liberia
- Libya
- Lithuania
- Luxembourg
- Madagascar
- Malawi
- Malaysia
- Mali
- Mauritania
- Mauritius
- Mexico
- Mongolia
- Montenegro
- Morocco
- Mozambique
- Myanmar
- Namibia
- Nepal
- Netherlands
- New Zealand
- Nicaragua
- Niger
- Nigeria
- North Macedonia
- Norway
- Pakistan
- Palau
- Papua New Guinea
- Paraguay
- Peru
- Philippines
- Poland
- Portugal
- Qatar
- Republic of Korea
- Republic of Moldova
- Romania
- Russian Federation
- Rwanda
- Samoa
- Saudi Arabia
- Senegal
- Serbia
- Sierra Leone
- Singapore
- Slovakia
- Slovenia
- South Africa
- Spain
- Sri Lanka
- Sudan
- Sweden
- Switzerland
- Syrian Arab Republic
- Thailand
- Timor-Leste
- Togo
- Tunisia
- Turkey
- Uganda
- Ukraine
- United Arab Emirates
- United Kingdom of Great Britain and Northern Ireland
- United Republic of Tanzania
- United States of America
- Uruguay
- Vanuatu
- Venezuela, Bolivarian Republic of
- Viet Nam
- Yemen
- Zambia
- Zimbabwe

=== Observers ===
- African Union
- Botswana
- Equatorial Guinea
- European Union
- Holy See
- International Committee of the Red Cross
- International Criminal Court
- International Criminal Police Organization
- International Institute for Democracy and Electoral Assistance
- Organisation of Islamic Cooperation
- Organisation internationale de la Francophonie
- Sovereign Military Order of Malta
