= Khalilur Rahman =

Foreign Minister of Bangladesh

His Excellency Khalilur Rahman
- খলিলুর রহমান
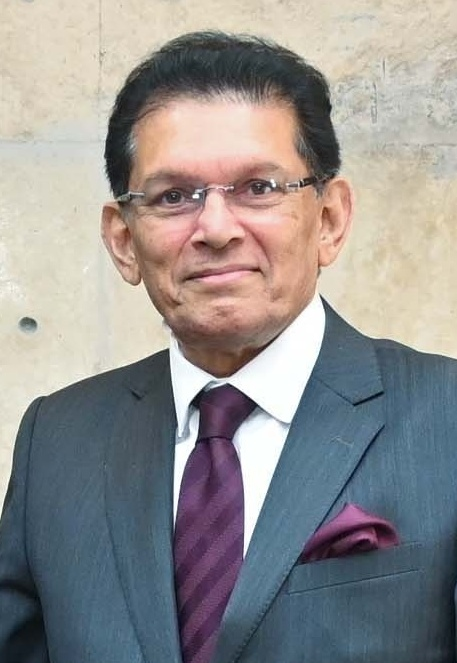
- Khalilur Rahman in 2026

Minister of Foreign Affairs
- Incumbent
- Assumed office 17 February 2026
- Prime Minister: Tarique Rahman
- Preceded by: Md. Touhid Hossain

President of the United Nations General Assembly
- Incumbent
- Assumed office 8 September 2026
- Preceded by: Annalena Baerbock

National Security Adviser and High Representative to the Chief Adviser on Rohingya Issue
- In office 9 April 2025 – 17 February 2026
- Chief Adviser: Muhammad Yunus
- Preceded by: Tarique Ahmed Siddique
- Succeeded by: AKM Shamsul Islam

Personal details
- Born: 1 April 1954 (age 72) East Bengal, Pakistan
- Party: Independent
- Children: 2
- Education: University of Dhaka; Tufts University; Harvard University

Khalilur Rahman (Bengali: খলিলুর রহমান; born 1 April 1954) is a Bangladeshi diplomat and economist currently serving as Minister of Foreign Affairs. In September 2026 he began a one-year term as President of the United Nations General Assembly for its 81st session.

== Education ==
Born in East Bengal, Pakistan (now Bangladesh), on 1 April 1954, Khalilur Rahman was educated at Dhaka Residential Model College and later studied economics at the University of Dhaka. In 1979 he worked briefly at American Express Bank before completing a Master's degree in law and diplomacy at the Fletcher School of Law and Diplomacy of Tufts University in the United States. He later earned a doctorate of philosophy in economics from the Harvard Kennedy School of Harvard University.

== Career ==
=== Civil service ===
Khalil joined the Bangladesh Civil Service in 1979, serving in the Ministry of Foreign Affairs and as a private secretary to the Minister of Foreign Affairs. From 1986 to 1991 he worked at the Permanent Mission of Bangladesh to the United Nations, including as First Secretary, and was a spokesperson for the least developed countries.

=== United Nations ===
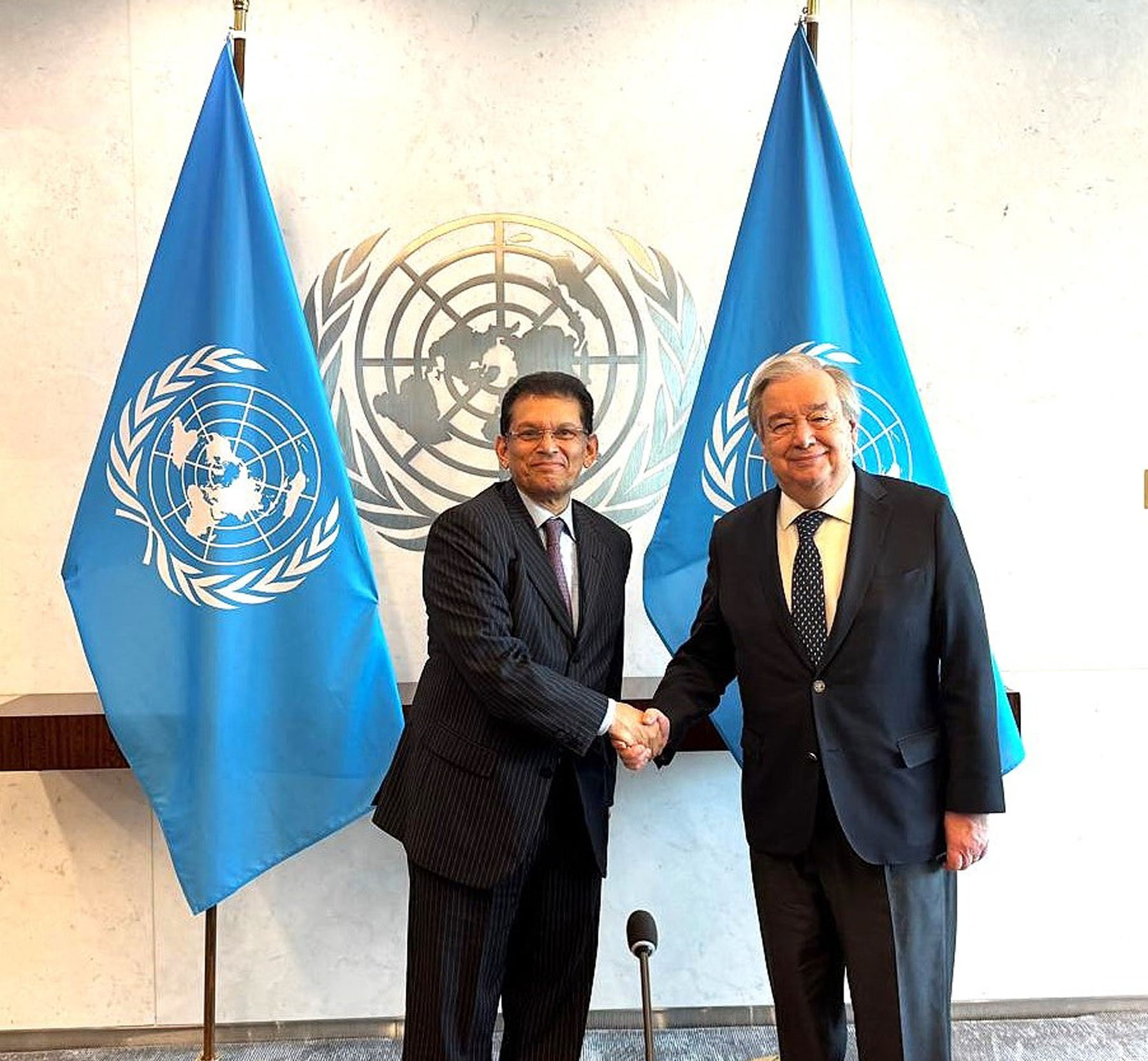
Khalilur Rahman meets United Nations Secretary-General António Guterres (2025)

Khalil joined the United Nations Conference on Trade and Development (UNCTAD) secretariat as chief of its New York office and also served as a special adviser for UNCTAD in Geneva. Later he was in charge of economic, social and development affairs in the executive office of the Secretary-General of the United Nations, and served as secretary of a high-level panel on the United Nations Technology Bank for Least Developed Countries and chair of an inter-agency group on non-tariff barriers to trade. His role involved working reports related to the least developed countries and contributing to the programme of action adopted at the third United Nations Conference on the Least Developed Countries in Brussels in 2001, which included provisions on duty-free and quota-free market access for the least developed countries.

In 2012 Khalilur Rahman was appointed head of the policy development, coordination and monitoring service for the least developed countries at the United Nations Office of the High Representative for the Least Developed Countries, Landlocked Developing Countries and Small Island Developing States.

=== Government of Bangladesh ===
In 2001 Khalilur Rahman served briefly as private secretary to Latifur Rahman, Chief Adviser of Bangladesh to the caretaker government of Bangladesh.

On 19 November 2024, following the July Uprising earlier that year, he was appointed as high representative for the Rohingya crisis and related issues by the Chief Adviser, Muhammad Yunus. From April 2025 he also held the role of National Security Adviser.

In February 2026 Khalilur Rahman was appointed as Minister of Foreign Affairs in the government of Tarique Rahman.

=== President of the United Nations General Assembly ===
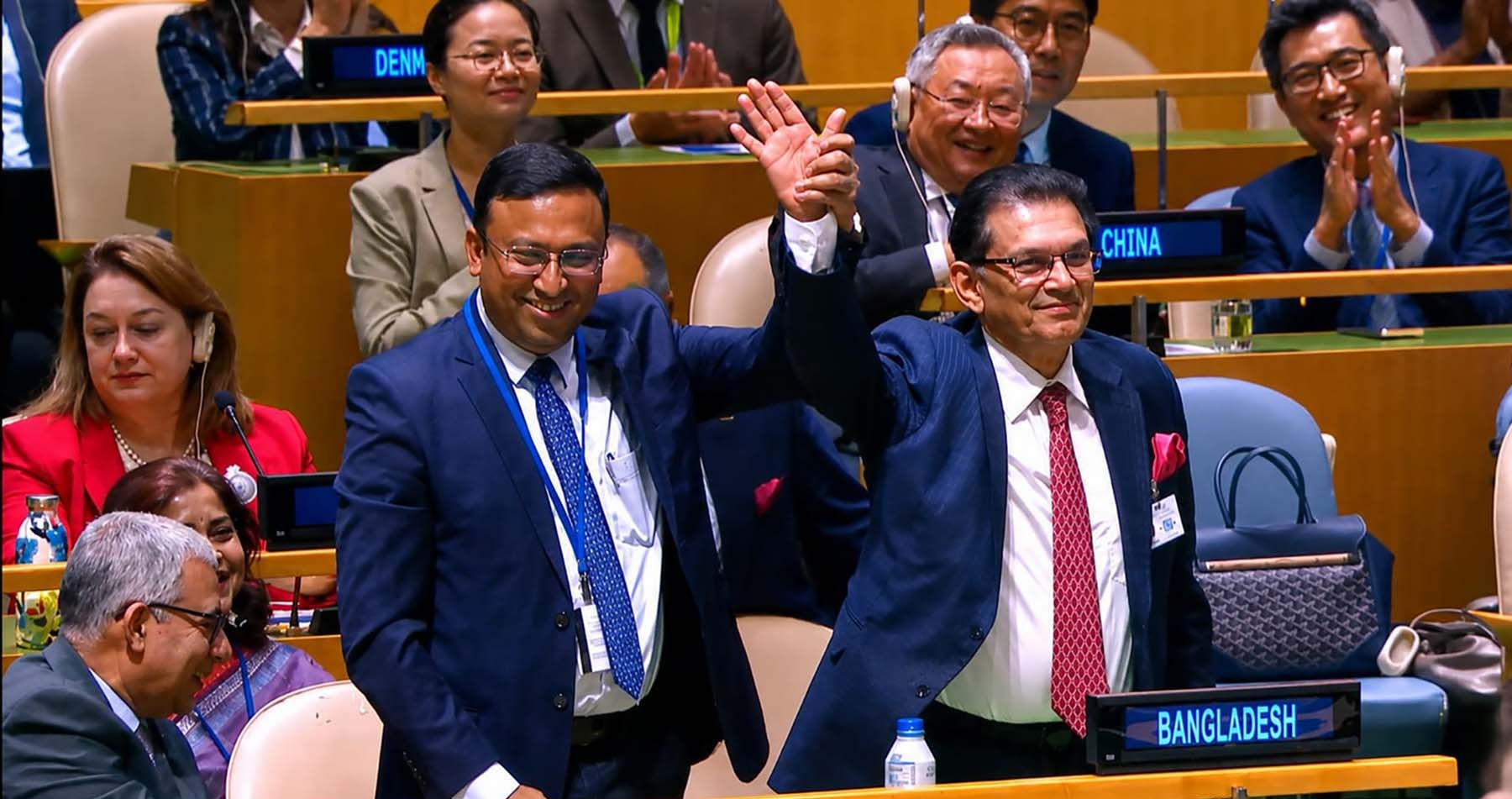
Khalilur Rahman after being elected President of the 81st session of the United Nations General Assembly, June 2026

On 2 June 2026, Khalilur Rahman was elected to succeed Annalena Baerbock as President of the United Nations General Assembly for its 81st session. He received 99 of the 190 ballots cast, with Cyprus's candidate Andreas Kakouris winning 91. He began his term on 8 September 2026, becoming the second Bangladeshi to hold the position, after Humayun Rashid Choudhury during the 41st session in 1986−1987.

== Other roles ==
Khalilur Rahman is a founding member of East West University in Dhaka and serves on its board of trustees.
