= Suela Janina =

Albanian diplomat

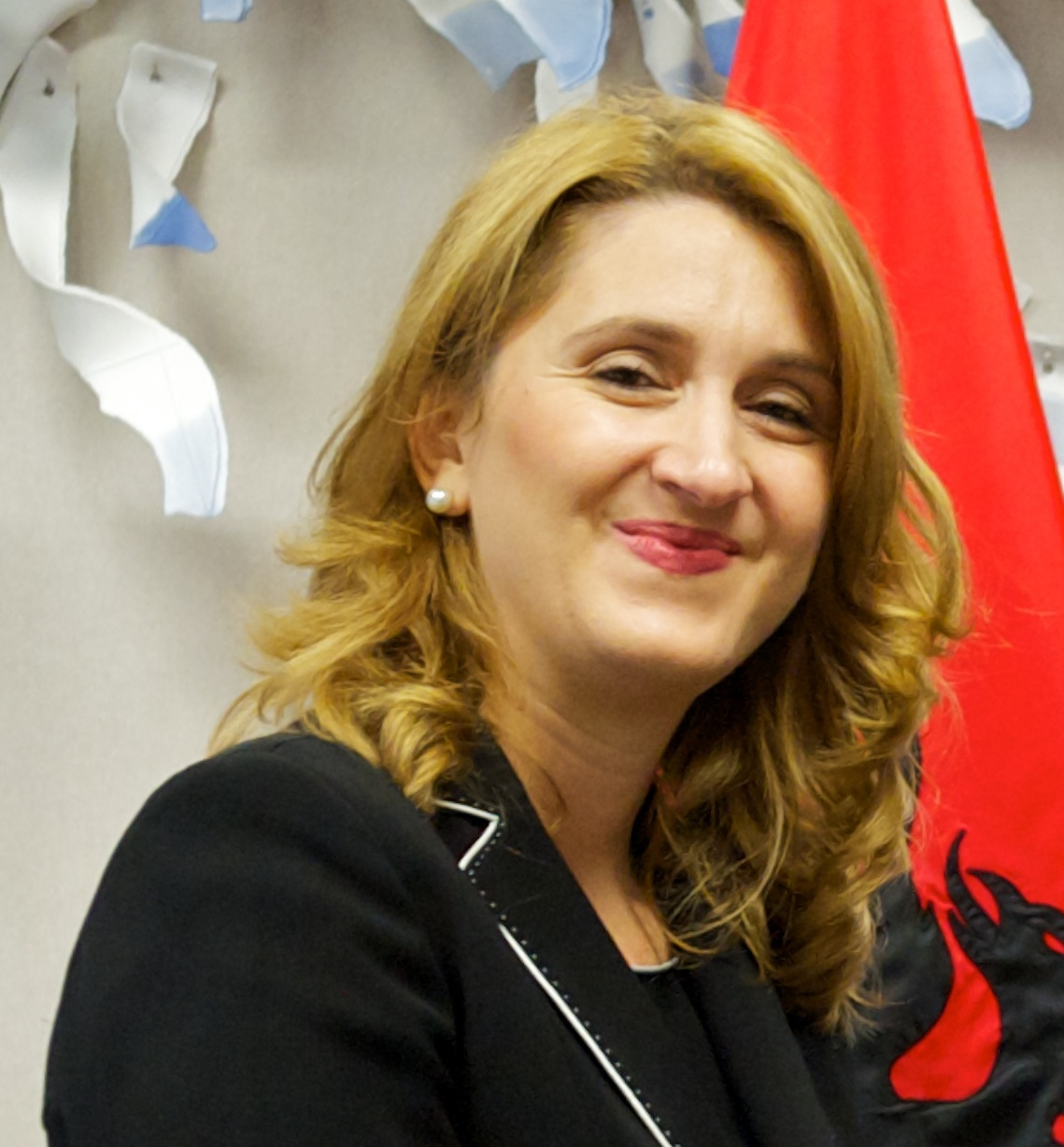
Janina in 2014.

Suela Janina (born 28 June 1976) is an Albanian diplomat. She has served as Ambassador of Albania to the European Union (EU) and the United Nations in New York.

== Biography ==
Janina graduated from the Faculty of Law of the University of Tirana, earned a Master's degree in Democracy and Human rights from a program run jointly by the University of Sarajevo and University of Bologna and a PhD in international law by the University of Tirana.

Janina was appointed as Ambassador of the Republic of Albania to the European Union (EU) on July 31, 2014. She also served as Ambassador to Belgium and Luxembourg. In 2021, she was appointed to the Committee on Enforced Disappearances.

Janina has also served as the Albanian Permanent Representative to the United Nations in New York, and presented her credentials to UN Secretary-General António Guterres in 2024. In 2025, she was elected as Vice President of the UN Women Executive Board and was appointed as co-facilitator to lead the overall review of the implementation of the outcomes of the World Summit on Information Society (WSIS).
