= Lok Bahadur Thapa =

Nepalese diplomat

His Excellency Lok Bahadur Thapa
- लोक बहादुर थापा
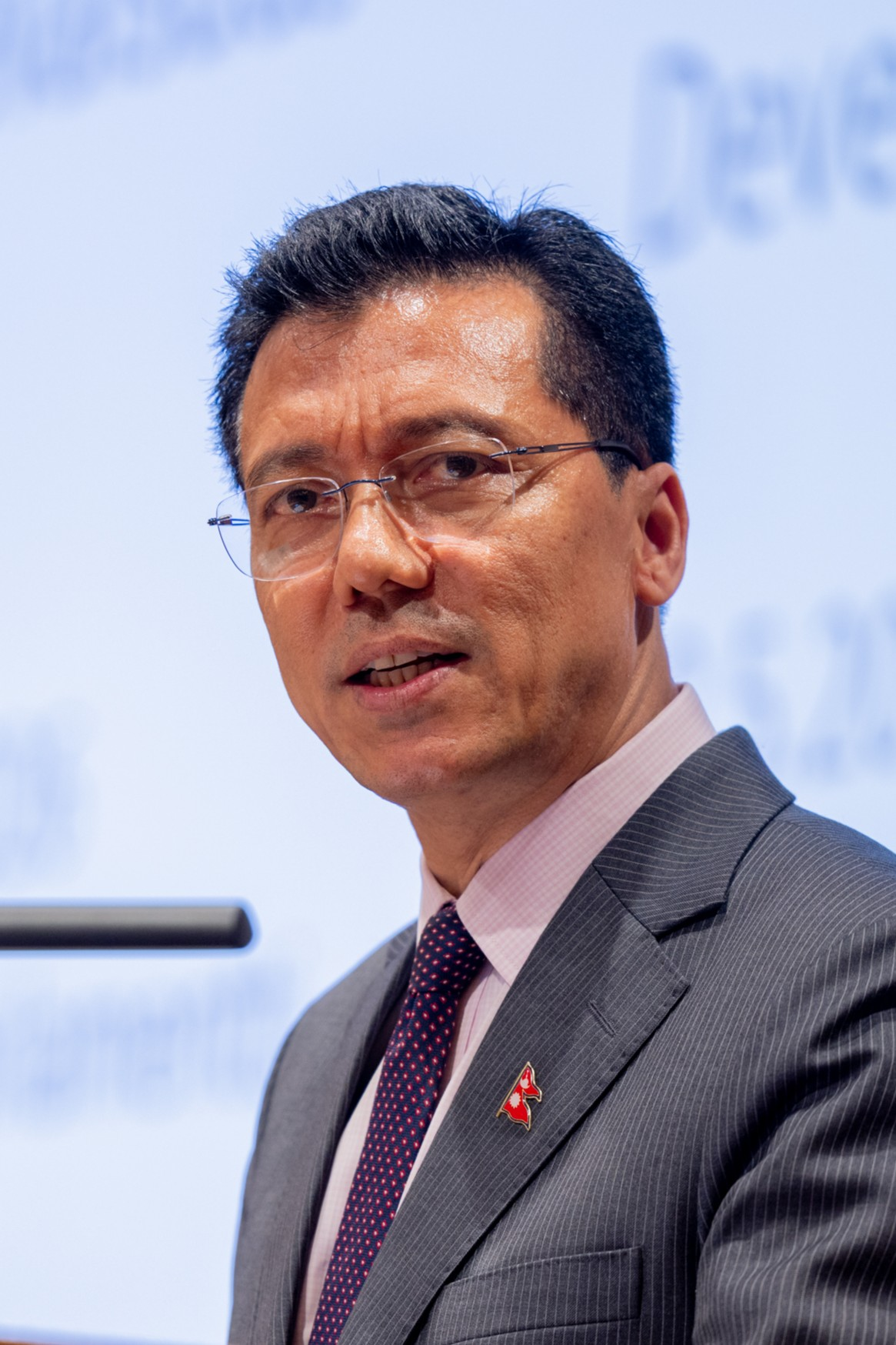
- Thapa in 2026

President of the United Nations Economic and Social Council
- In office 31 July 2025 – 31 July 2026
- Preceded by: Bob Rae
- Succeeded by: Amar Bendjama

Permanent Representative of Nepal to the United Nations
- Incumbent
- Assumed office 1 September 2023
- Preceded by: Amrit Bahadur Rai

Personal details
- Born: 1970 (age 55–56) Nepal
- Education: Tribhuvan University; Lancaster University
- Profession: Diplomat

Lok Bahadur Thapa (born 1970) is a Nepalese diplomat currently serving as the permanent representative of Nepal to the United Nations. He assumed office on 1 September 2023, succeeding Amrit Bahadur Rai. He is also a former president of the United Nations Economic and Social Council (ECOSOC).

== Career ==
Thapa joined the Nepalese Foreign Service in 1990. Over his career, he has held various key positions:

- Director General of the Department of Passports (2014–2016)
- Division Head of the Southeast Asia Division (2014)
- Under-Secretary of the Policy and Planning Division
- Personal Secretary to the Minister for Foreign Affairs (2014)

He has also served in several diplomatic missions abroad:

- First Secretary at the Embassy of Nepal in Beijing, China (1998–2002)
- Counsellor at the Embassy of Nepal in Riyadh, Saudi Arabia (2004–2008)
- Deputy Chief of Mission at the Embassy of Nepal in Canberra, Australia (2009–2014)

From 2016 to 2020, Thapa served as the ambassador of Nepal to Belgium, the Netherlands, and Luxembourg. He was concurrently accredited as Head of Mission to the European Union and as Nepal’s permanent representative to the Organisation for the Prohibition of Chemical Weapons.

== United Nations ==
On 1 September 2023, he presented his credentials to UN secretary-general António Guterres as Nepal's permanent representative to the United Nations.

In July 2024, he was elected Vice President of the United Nations Economic and Social Council (ECOSOC) for the 2025 session, representing the Asia-Pacific Group.

On 31 July 2025, Thapa was nominated President of the ECOSOC, aiming at contributing to eliminate hunger, promoting digital entrepreneurship and youth engagement, fostering climate action and resilience, reforming the international financial architecture, and commemorating ECOSOC's 80th anniversary.

He also serves as the chair of the Global Coordination Bureau of the Least Developed Countries (LDCs), advocating for the developmental interests of these nations within the UN framework.

== Education ==
Thapa holds a Master of Public Administration and a bachelor's degree in commerce from Tribhuvan University, Kathmandu, Nepal. He also earned a Master of Diplomacy from Lancaster University in the United Kingdom.

== See also ==
- Foreign relations of Nepal
- Ministry of Foreign Affairs (Nepal)
