= United Nations General Assembly Second Committee =

United Nations body

- Abbreviation: ECOFIN, C2
- Legal status: Active
- Headquarters: New York, United States
- Head: Chairperson; Suela Janina; Albania
- Parent organization: United Nations General Assembly
- Website: www.un.org/en/ga/second

The United Nations General Assembly Second Committee (also known as the Economic and Financial Committee or ECOFIN or C2) is one of the six main committees of the United Nations General Assembly. It deals with global finance and economic matters.

The Second Committee meets every year in early October and aims to finish its work by the end of November. All 193 member states of the UN can attend.

== Mandate ==
The work of the committee falls under eleven thematic clusters:

1. Macroeconomic policies
2. Operational activities for development
3. Financing for development
4. Groups of countries in special situations
5. Globalization and interdependence
6. Eradication of poverty
7. Sustainable development
8. Information and communication technologies for development
9. Agriculture development, food security and nutrition
10. Human settlements and sustainable urban development
11. Sovereignty of the Palestinian people over their natural resources

== Current state ==
In its 81st Session, the committee focused on:

A. Promotion of sustained economic growth and sustainable development in accordance with the relevant resolutions of the General Assembly and recent United Nations conferences. Specifically:

- Information and communications technologies for sustainable development
- Macroeconomic policy questions
- Follow-up to and implementation of the outcomes of the International Conferences on Financing for Development
- Sustainable development
- Follow-up to the implementation of the New Urban Agenda and strengthening of the United Nations Human Settlements Programme
- Groups of countries in special situations
- Eradication of poverty and other development issues
- Operational activities for development

B. Maintenance of international peace and security. Specifically:

- Permanent sovereignty of the Palestinian people in the Occupied Palestinian Territory, including East Jerusalem, and of the Arab population in the occupied Syrian Golan over their natural resource

== Reporting bodies ==
The committee has five main bodies that report through it to the General Assembly. Two programmes: the United Nations Environment Programme and the United Nations Human Settlements Programme, as well as the governing bodies of the three Rio conventions: the Convention on Biological Diversity (CBD), the Convention to Combat Desertification (UNCCD) and the Framework Convention on Climate Change (UNFCCC).

== Working methods ==
The work of the committee usually begins in early October and ends sometime by the end of November, though extensions are often granted to allow the committee to continue its work until early to mid-December. Its work is split into two main stages: (1) general debate and (2) action on individual items. The first stage, the general debate, lasts up to one week and begins with a keynote address by an invited speaker. The second stage lasts around four weeks, and is usually when negotiations on draft proposals are conducted.

The committee also meets annually in a joint meeting with the Economic and Social Council.

== Bureau ==
The following make up the bureau of the Second Committee for the 81st Session of the General Assembly:

Name	Country	Position
Suela Janina	Albania	Chairperson
Hussain Azhaan Mohamed Hussain	Maldives	Vice-chair
Walter José Mira Ramírez	El Salvador	Vice-chair
Robert Bunbury	Canada	Vice-chair
Ivo Miguel Rubio	Angola	Rapporteur

== See also ==
- United Nations General Assembly First Committee
- United Nations General Assembly Third Committee
- United Nations General Assembly Fourth Committee
- United Nations General Assembly Fifth Committee
- United Nations General Assembly Sixth Committee
