= United Nations General Assembly =

Intergovernmental organization organ

United Nations General Assembly: - Arabic: الجمعية العامة للأمم المتحدة; Chinese: 联合国大会; French: Assemblée générale des Nations unies; Russian: Генеральная Ассамблея Организации Объединённых Наций; Spanish: Asamblea General de las Naciones Unidas

- United Nations General Assembly Hall at the UN Headquarters in New York City in 2006
- Abbreviation: UNGA; GA; AGNU; AG
- Formation: 1945; 81 years ago
- Type: Principal organ
- Legal status: Active
- Headquarters: New York City, U.S.
- President: Khalilur Rahman
- Parent organization: United Nations
- Website: un.org/ga
- African Group (54) Asia and the Pacific Group (54) Eastern European Group (23) Latin American and Caribbean Group (GRULAC) (33) Western European and Others Group (WEOG) (29)

The United Nations General Assembly (UNGA or GA) (Note: AGNU or AG in French: Assemblée générale des Nations Unies) is one of the six principal organs of the United Nations (UN), serving as its main deliberative, policymaking, and representative organ. Currently in its 81st session, its powers, composition, functions, and procedures are set out in Chapter IV of the United Nations Charter.

The United Nations General Assembly is responsible for the United Nations budget, appointing the non-permanent members to the Security Council, appointing the secretary-general of the United Nations, receiving reports from other parts of the United Nations System, and making recommendations through resolutions. It also establishes numerous subsidiary organs to advance or assist in its broad mandate. The United Nations General Assembly is the only United Nations organ where all member states have equal representation.

The General Assembly meets under its president or the United Nations secretary-general in annual sessions at the General Assembly Building, within the United Nations headquarters in New York City. The primary phase of these meetings generally runs from September through part of January until all issues are addressed, which is often before the next session starts. It can also reconvene for special and emergency special sessions. The first session was convened on 10 January 1946 in the Methodist Central Hall in London and included representatives of the 51 founding nations.

Most questions are decided in the General Assembly by a simple majority. Each member country has one vote. Voting on certain important questions—namely recommendations on peace and security; budgetary concerns; and the election, admission, suspension, or expulsion of members—is by a two-thirds majority of those present and voting. Apart from the approval of budgetary matters, including the adoption of a scale of assessment, Assembly resolutions are not binding on the members. The Assembly may make recommendations on any matters within the scope of the United Nations, except matters of peace and security under the Security Council's consideration.

During the 1980s, the Assembly became a forum for "North–South dialogue" between industrialized nations and developing countries on a range of international issues. These issues came to the fore because of the phenomenal growth and changing makeup of the United Nations membership. In 1945, the United Nations had 51 members, which by the 21st century nearly quadrupled to 193, of which more than two-thirds are developing countries. Because of their numbers, developing countries are often able to determine the agenda of the Assembly (using coordinating groups like the G77), the character of its debates, and the nature of its decisions. For many developing countries, the UN is the source of much of their diplomatic influence and the principal outlet for their foreign relations initiatives.

Although the resolutions passed by the General Assembly do not have binding forces over the member nations (apart from budgetary measures), pursuant to its Uniting for Peace resolution of November 1950 (resolution 377 (V)), the Assembly may also take action if the Security Council fails to act, owing to the negative vote of a permanent member, in a case where there appears to be a threat to the peace, breach of the peace or act of aggression. The Assembly can consider the matter immediately with a view to making recommendations to Members for collective measures to maintain or restore international peace and security.

== History ==
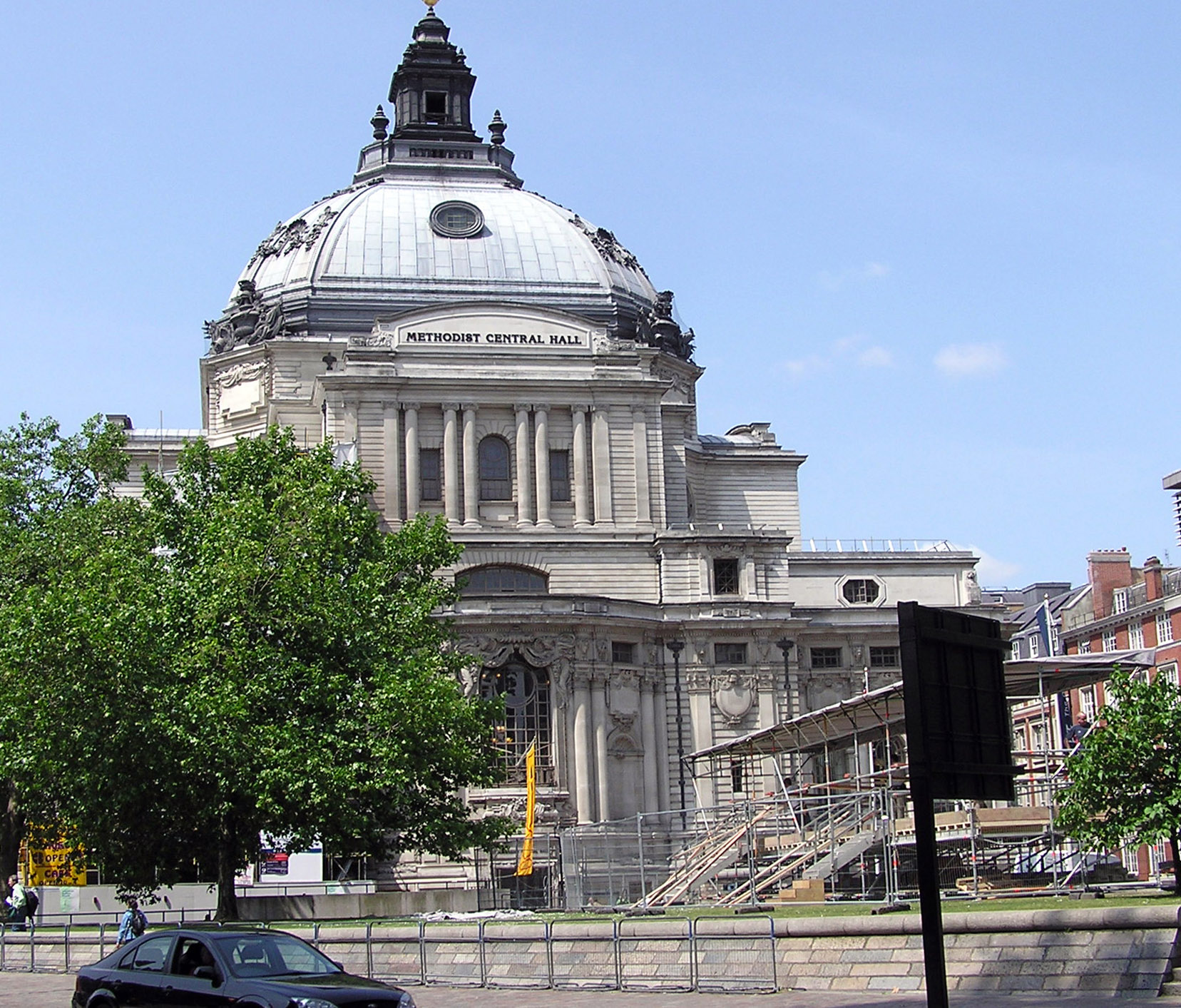
Methodist Central Hall, London, the location of the first meeting of the United Nations General Assembly in 1946

The first session of the UN General Assembly was convened on 10 January 1946 in the Methodist Central Hall in London and included representatives of 51 nations. Subsequently, until moving to its permanent home in Manhattan in 1951, the Assembly convened at the former New York City Pavilion of the 1939 New York World's Fair in Flushing, New York. On November 29, 1947, the Assembly voted to adopt the United Nations Partition Plan for Palestine at this venue.

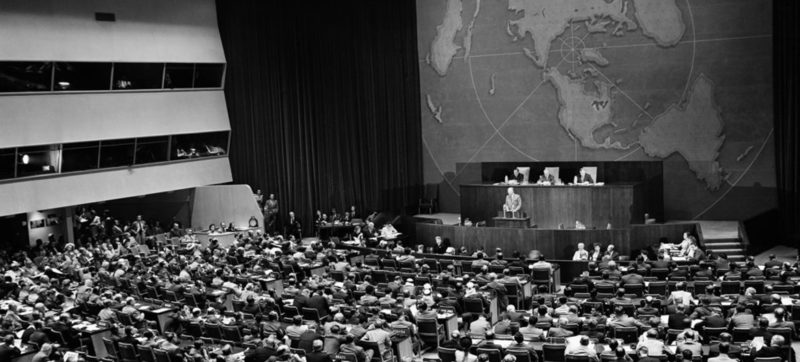
The 1947 meeting at the General Assembly meeting place between 1946 and 1951 in Flushing, New York

During the 1946–1951 period the General Assembly, the Security Council and the Economic Social Council also conducted proceedings at the United Nations interim headquarters at Lake Success, New York. During this time in 1949, the CBS Television network provided live coverage of these sessions on its United Nations in Action broadcast series which was produced by the journalist Edmund Chester.

It moved to the permanent Headquarters of the United Nations in New York City at the start of its seventh regular annual session, on 14 October 1952. In December 1988, in order to hear Yasser Arafat, the General Assembly organized its 43rd session in the Palace of Nations, in Geneva, Switzerland.

== Membership ==
All 193 members of the United Nations are members of the General Assembly, with the addition of the Holy See and Palestine as observer states as well as the European Union (since 1974). Further, the United Nations General Assembly may grant observer status to an international organization or entity, which entitles the entity to participate in the work of the United Nations General Assembly, though with limitations.

== Agenda ==
The agenda for each session is planned up to seven months in advance and begins with the release of a preliminary list of items to be included in the provisional agenda. This is refined into a provisional agenda 60 days before the opening of the session. After the session begins, the final agenda is adopted in a plenary meeting which allocates the work to the various main committees, who later submit reports back to the Assembly for adoption by consensus or by vote.

Items on the agenda are numbered. Regular plenary sessions of the General Assembly in recent years have initially been scheduled to be held over the course of just three months; however, additional workloads have extended these sessions until just short of the next session. The routinely scheduled portions of the sessions normally commence on "the Tuesday of the third week in September, counting from the first week that contains at least one working day," per the UN Rules of Procedure. The last two of these Regular sessions were routinely scheduled to recess exactly three months afterward in early December but were resumed in January and extended until just before the beginning of the following sessions.

== Resolutions ==
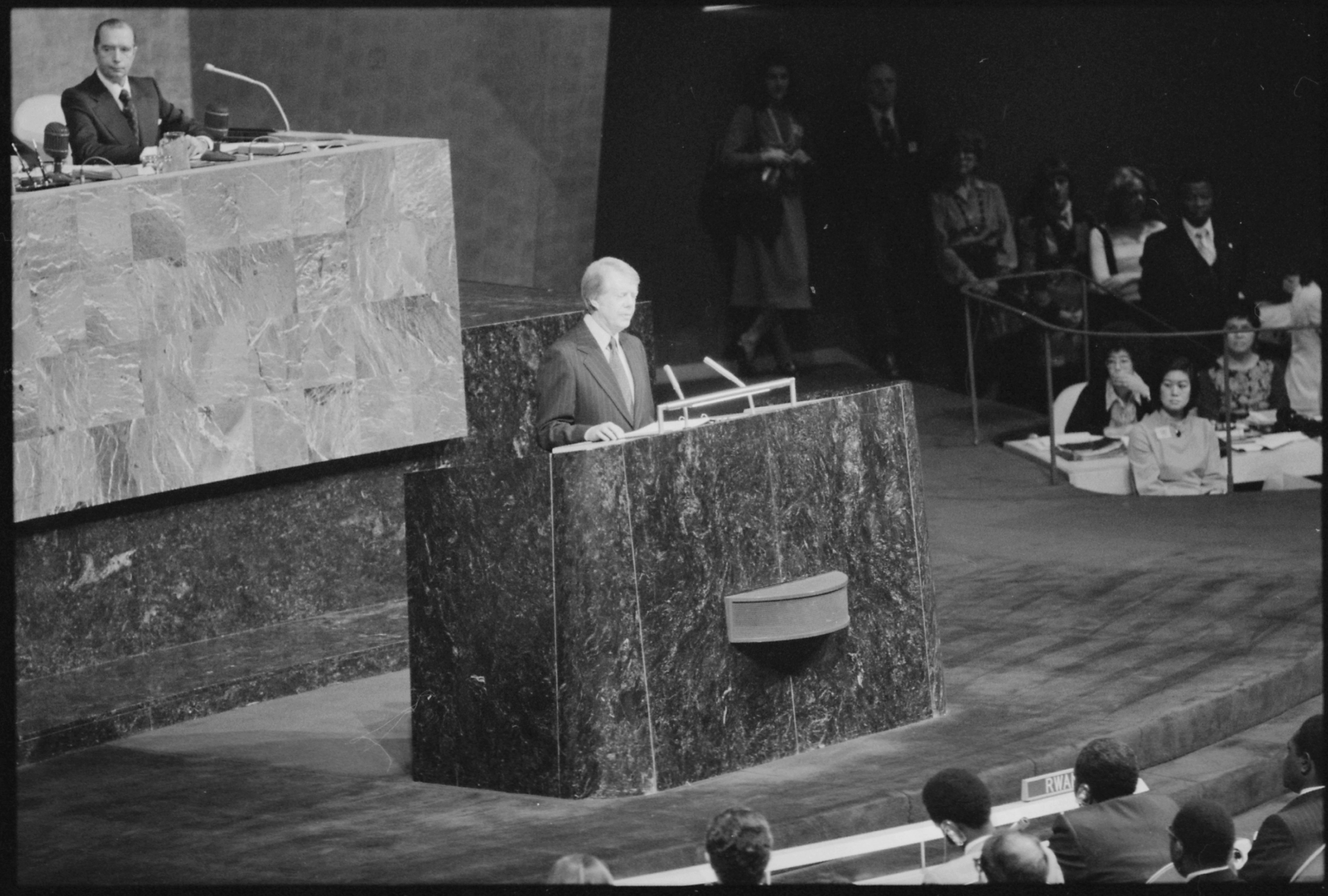
President of the United States Jimmy Carter addresses the 32nd session of the UN General Assembly on 4 October 1977.

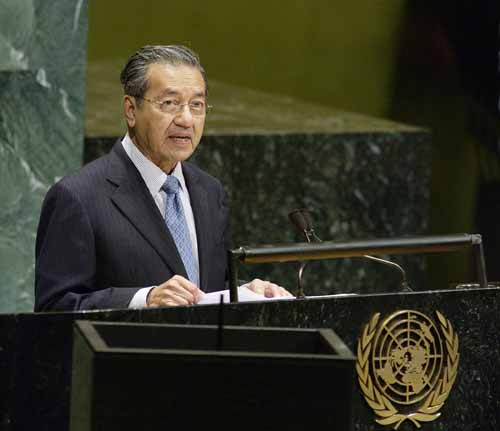
Prime Minister of Malaysia Mahathir Mohamad addresses the 58th session of the UN General Assembly on 25 September 2003.

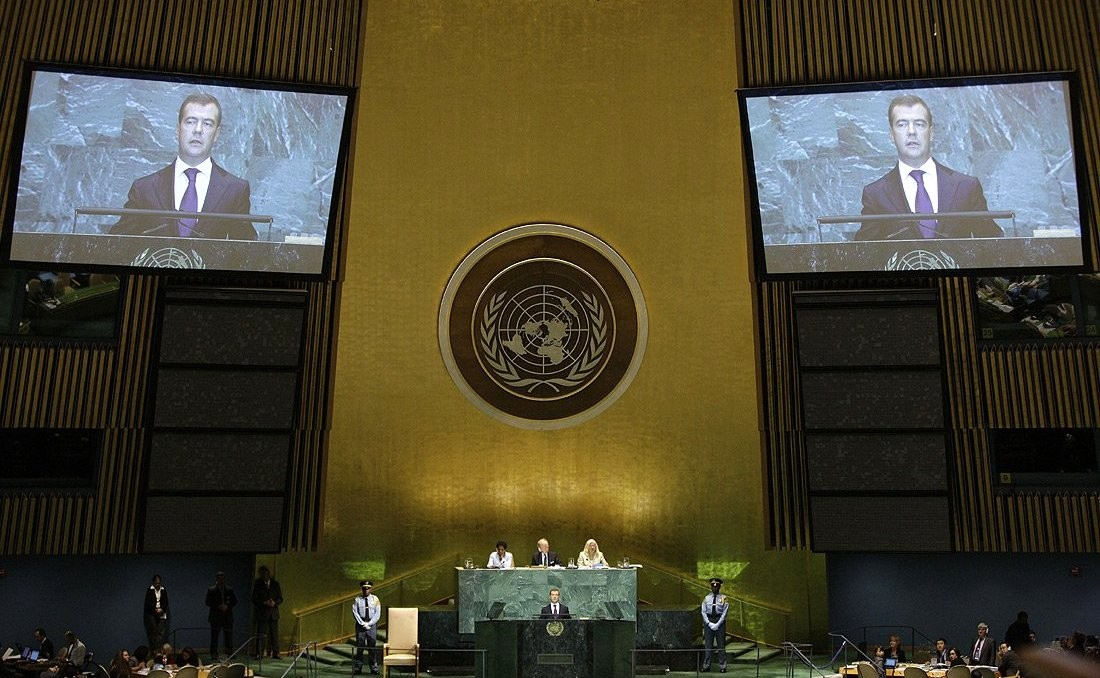
President of Russia Dmitry Medvedev addresses the 64th session of the UN General Assembly on 24 September 2009.

The General Assembly votes on many resolutions brought forth by sponsoring states. These are generally statements symbolizing the sense of the international community about an array of world issues. Most General Assembly resolutions are not enforceable as a legal or practical matter, because the General Assembly lacks enforcement powers with respect to most issues. The General Assembly has the authority to make final decisions in some areas such as the United Nations budget.

The General Assembly can also refer an issue to the Security Council to put in place a binding resolution.

=== Resolution numbering scheme ===
From the First to the Thirtieth General Assembly sessions, all General Assembly resolutions were numbered consecutively, with the resolution number followed by the session number in Roman numbers (for example, Resolution 1514 (XV), which was the 1514th numbered resolution adopted by the Assembly and was adopted at the Fifteenth Regular Session (1960)). Beginning in the Thirty-First Session, resolutions are numbered by individual session (for example Resolution 41/10 represents the 10th resolution adopted at the Forty-First Session).

== Budget ==
The General Assembly also approves the budget of the United Nations and decides how much money each member state must pay to run the organization.

The Charter of the United Nations gives responsibility for approving the budget to the General Assembly (Chapter IV, Article 17) and for preparing the budget to the secretary-general, as "chief administrative officer" (Chapter XV, Article 97). The Charter also addresses the non-payment of assessed contributions (Chapter IV, Article 19). The planning, programming, budgeting, monitoring, and evaluation cycle of the United Nations has evolved over the years; major resolutions on the process include General Assembly resolutions: 41/213 of 19 December 1986, 42/211 of 21 December 1987, and 45/248 of 21 December 1990.

The budget covers the costs of United Nations programmes in areas such as political affairs, international justice and law, international cooperation for development, public information, human rights, and humanitarian affairs.

The main source of funds for the regular budget is the contributions of member states. The scale of assessments is based on the capacity of countries to pay. This is determined by considering their relative shares of total gross national product, adjusted to take into account a number of factors, including their per capita incomes.

In addition to the regular budget, member states are assessed for the costs of the international tribunals and, in accordance with a modified version of the basic scale, for the costs of peacekeeping operations.

== Elections ==
The General Assembly is entrusted in the United Nations Charter with electing members to various organs within the United Nations system. The procedure for these elections can be found in Section 15 of the Rules of Procedure for the General Assembly. The most important elections for the General Assembly include those for the upcoming President of the General Assembly, the Security Council, the Economic and Social Council, the Human Rights Council, the International Court of Justice, judges of the United Nations Dispute Tribunal, and United Nations Appeals Tribunal. Most elections are held annually, with the exception of the election of judges to the ICJ, which happens triennially.

The Assembly annually elects five non-permanent members of the Security Council for two-year terms, 18 members of the Economic and Social Council for three-year terms, and 14–18 members of the Human Rights Council for three-year terms. It also elects the leadership of the next General Assembly session, i.e. the next President of the General Assembly, the 21 vice presidents, and the bureaux of the six main committees.

Elections to the International Court of Justice take place every three years in order to ensure continuity within the court. In these elections, five judges are elected for nine-year terms. These elections are held jointly with the Security Council, with candidates needing to receive an absolute majority of the votes in both bodies.

The Assembly also, in conjunction with the Security Council, selects the next secretary-general of the United Nations. The main part of these elections is held in the Security Council, with the General Assembly simply appointing the candidate that receives the Council's nomination.

=== Regional groups ===
Division of seats of the Economic and Social Council based on regional grouping: African States (14) Asia-Pacific States (11) Eastern European States (6) Latin American and Caribbean States (10) Western European and Other States (13)

The United Nations Regional Groups were created in order to facilitate the equitable geographical distribution of seats among the Member States in different United Nations bodies. Resolution 33/138 of the General Assembly states that "the composition of the various organs of the United Nations should be so constituted as to ensure their representative character." Thus, member states of the United Nations are informally divided into five regions, with most bodies in the United Nations system having a specific number of seats allocated for each regional group. Additionally, the leadership of most bodies also rotates between the regional groups, such as the presidency of the General Assembly and the chairmanship of the six main committees.

The regional groups work according to the consensus principle. Candidates who are endorsed by them are, as a rule, elected by the General Assembly in any subsequent elections.

== Sessions ==
=== Regular sessions ===
The General Assembly meets annually in a regular session that opens on the third Tuesday of September, and runs until the following September. Sessions are held at United Nations Headquarters in New York unless changed by the General Assembly by a majority vote.

The regular session is split into two distinct periods, the main and resumed parts of the session. During the main part of the session, which runs from the opening of the session until Christmas break in December, most of the work of the Assembly is done. This period is the Assembly's most intense period of work and includes the general debate and the bulk of the work of the six Main Committees. The resumed part of the session, however, which runs from January until the beginning of the new session, includes more thematic debates, consultation processes and working group meetings.

==== General debate ====
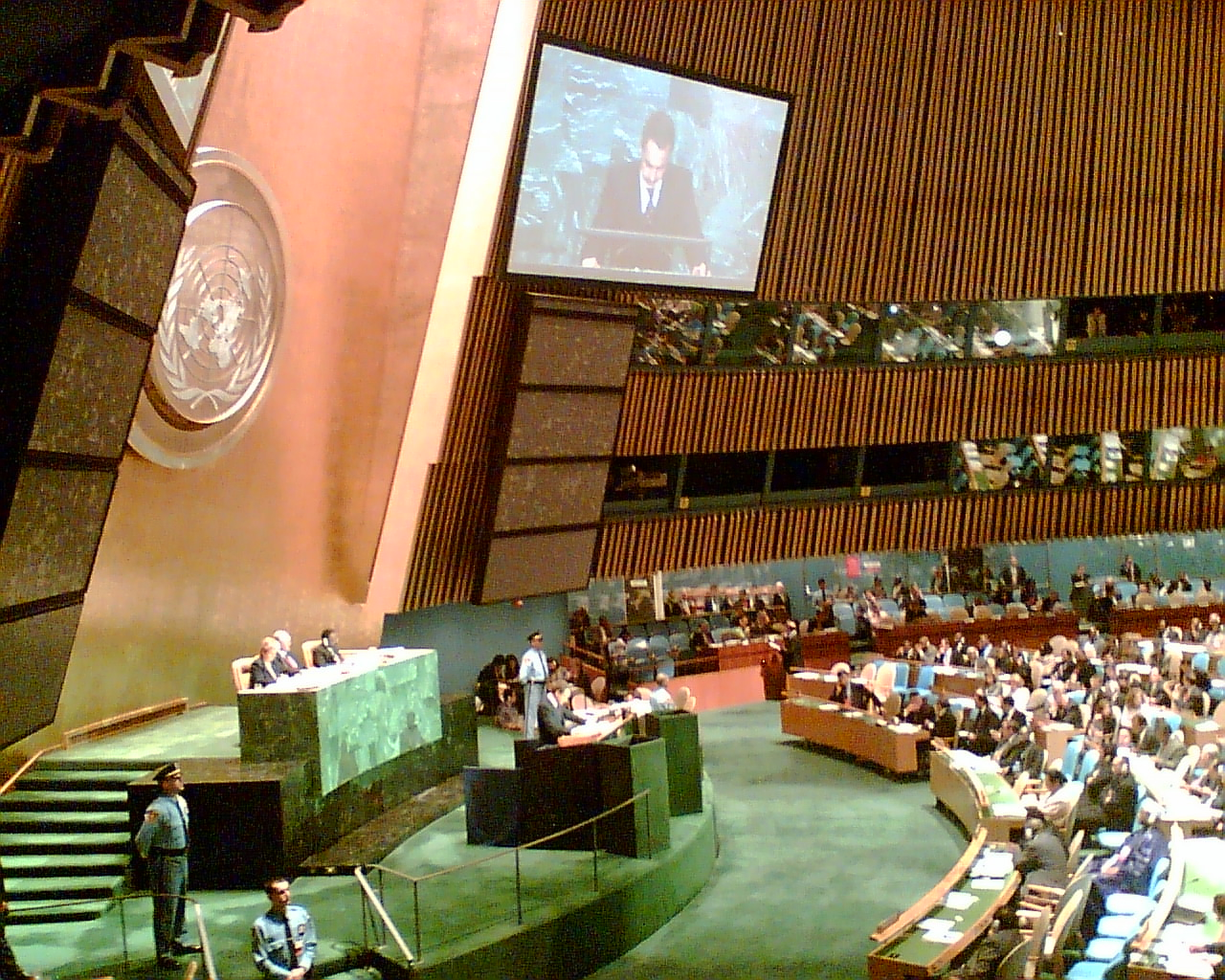
Prime Minister of Spain José Luis Rodríguez Zapatero addresses the 60th session of the UN General Assembly on 20 September 2005.

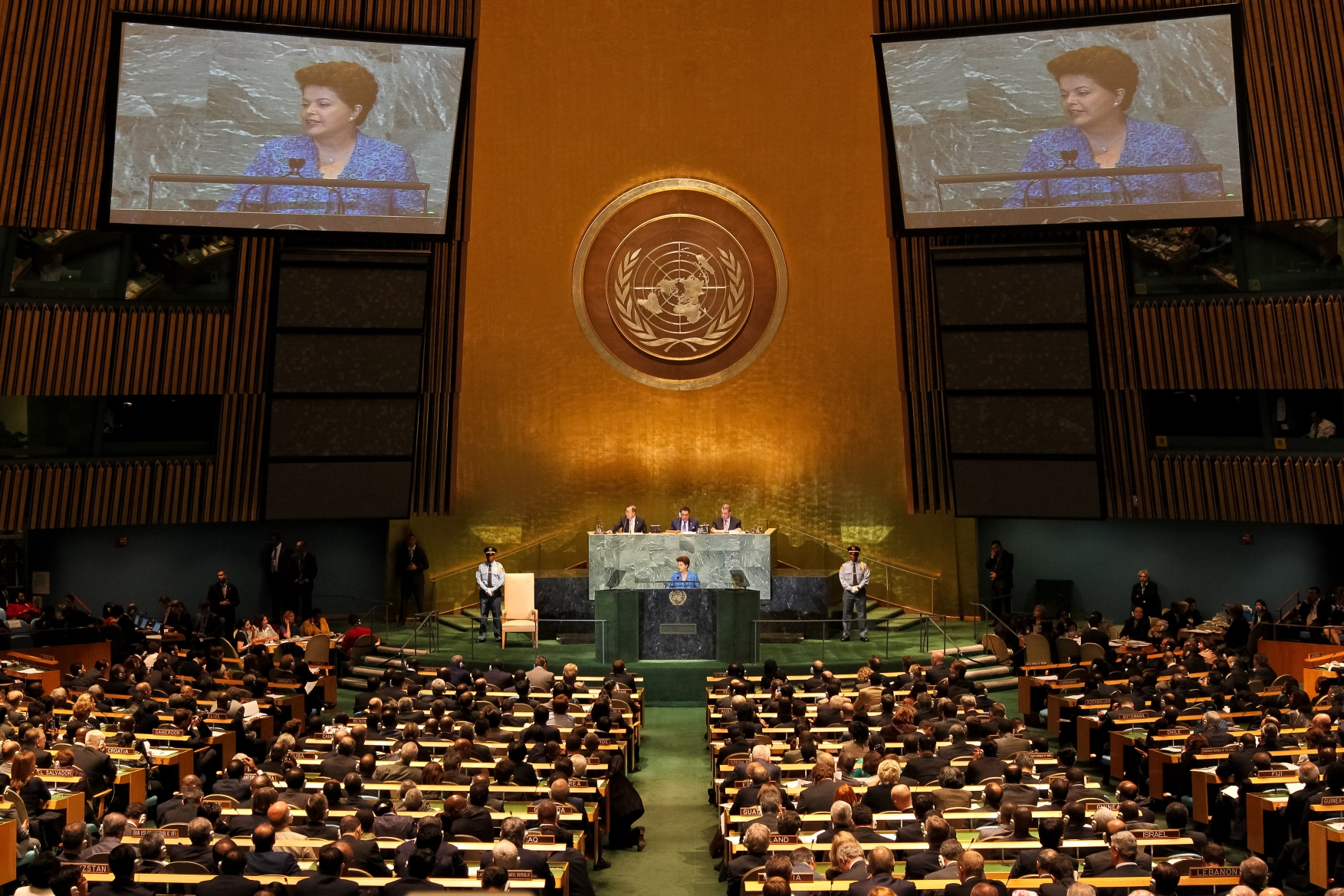
President of Brazil Dilma Rousseff delivers the opening speech at the 66th session of the UN General Assembly on 21 September 2011, marking the first time a woman opened a United Nations session.

The general debate of each new session of the General Assembly is held the week following the official opening of the session, typically the following Tuesday, and is held without interruption for nine working days. The general debate is a high-level event, typically attended by Member States' heads of state or government, government ministers and United Nations delegates. At the general debate, Member States are given the opportunity to raise attention to topics or issues that they feel are important. In addition to the general debate, there are also many other high-level thematic meetings, summits and informal events held during general debate week. In the 80 general debates between 23 October 1946 and 29 September 2025 there were in total 11,127 speeches; 3,356 of them were held by heads of state or government. Since 2008 (except 2010) the majority of speeches was given by heads of state or government. In average, ca 6% of the member countries were not attending the general debate, among them Nicaragua (23 of 80 times absent), Saudi-Arabia, Luxembourg (each 21 of 80 times absent) and Ivory Coast (20 of 66 times absent). There were only two general debates with all member states participating: 2017 and 2018. In recent years, for example Afghanistan and Myanmar did not take part because of the unrecognized status of their government.

The eighty-first regular session of the General Assembly officially opened on September 15, 2026, under the presidency of Khalilur Rahman of Bangladesh. Operating under the session theme "Restoring Trust, Managing Transformation: A United Nations That Delivers for All," the assembly focused its structural agenda on six foundational pillars: international peace and justice, accelerated implementation of the Sustainable Development Goals (SDGs), climate resilience, human rights protections, inclusive digital and AI governance, and comprehensive multilateral reforms. Following the conclusion of the annual high-level General Debate on September 28, 2026, a primary procedural focus of the eighty-first session moved toward the upcoming joint appointment of the next United Nations Secretary-General, scheduled to succeed António Guterres upon the expiration of his term on January 1, 2027.

=== Special sessions ===
Special sessions, or UNGASS, may be convened in three different ways, at the request of the Security Council, at the request of a majority of United Nations member States or by a single member, as long as a majority concurs. Special sessions typically cover one single topic and end with the adoption of one or two outcome documents, such as a political declaration, action plan or strategy to combat said topic. They are also typically high-level events with participation from heads of state and government, as well as by government ministers. There have been 32 special sessions in the history of the United Nations.

=== Emergency special sessions ===
If the Security Council is unable, usually due to disagreement among the permanent members, to come to a decision on a threat to international peace and security, then emergency special sessions can be convened in order to make appropriate recommendations to member states for collective measures. This power was given to the Assembly in Resolution 377(V) of 3 November 1950.

Emergency special sessions can be called by the Security Council if supported by at least seven members, or by a majority of Member States of the United Nations. If enough votes are had, the Assembly must meet within 24 hours, with Members being notified at least twelve hours before the opening of the session. There have been 11 emergency special sessions in the history of the United Nations.

== Subsidiary organs ==
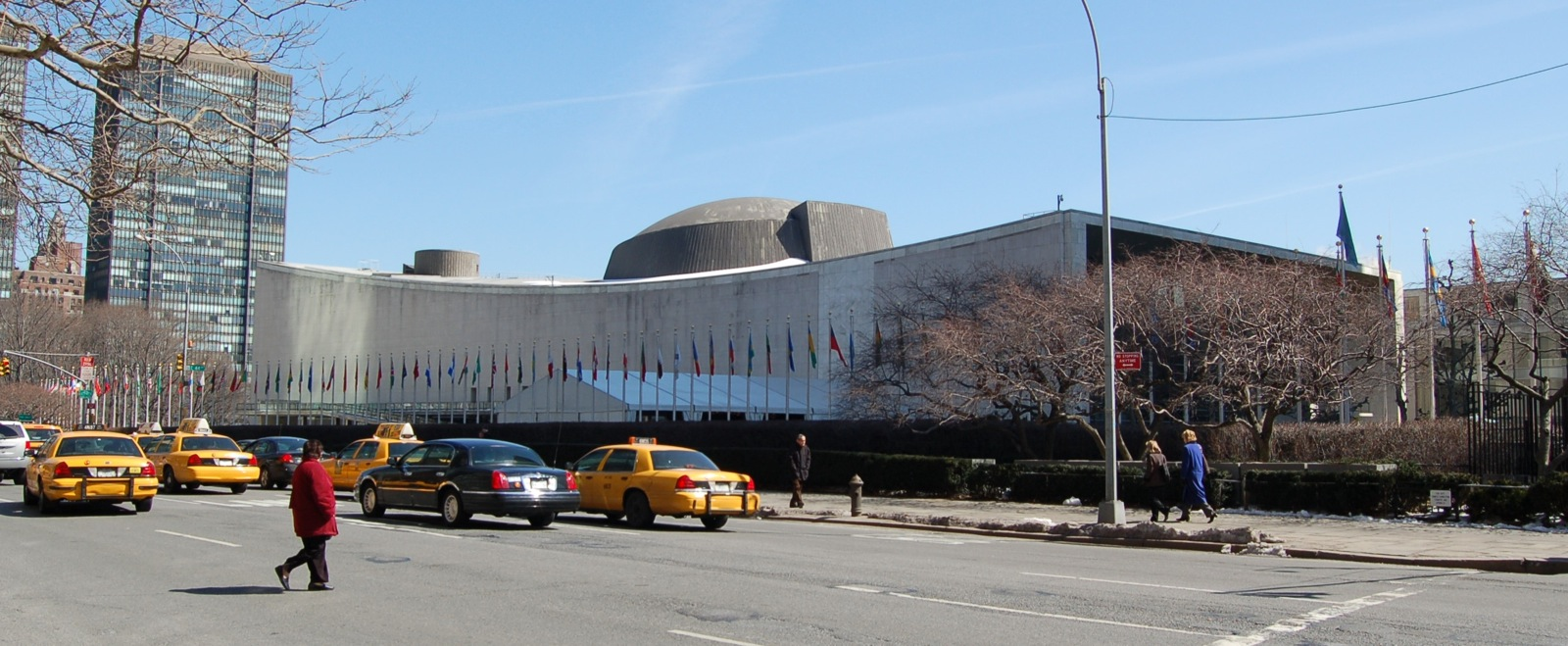
The United Nations General Assembly building

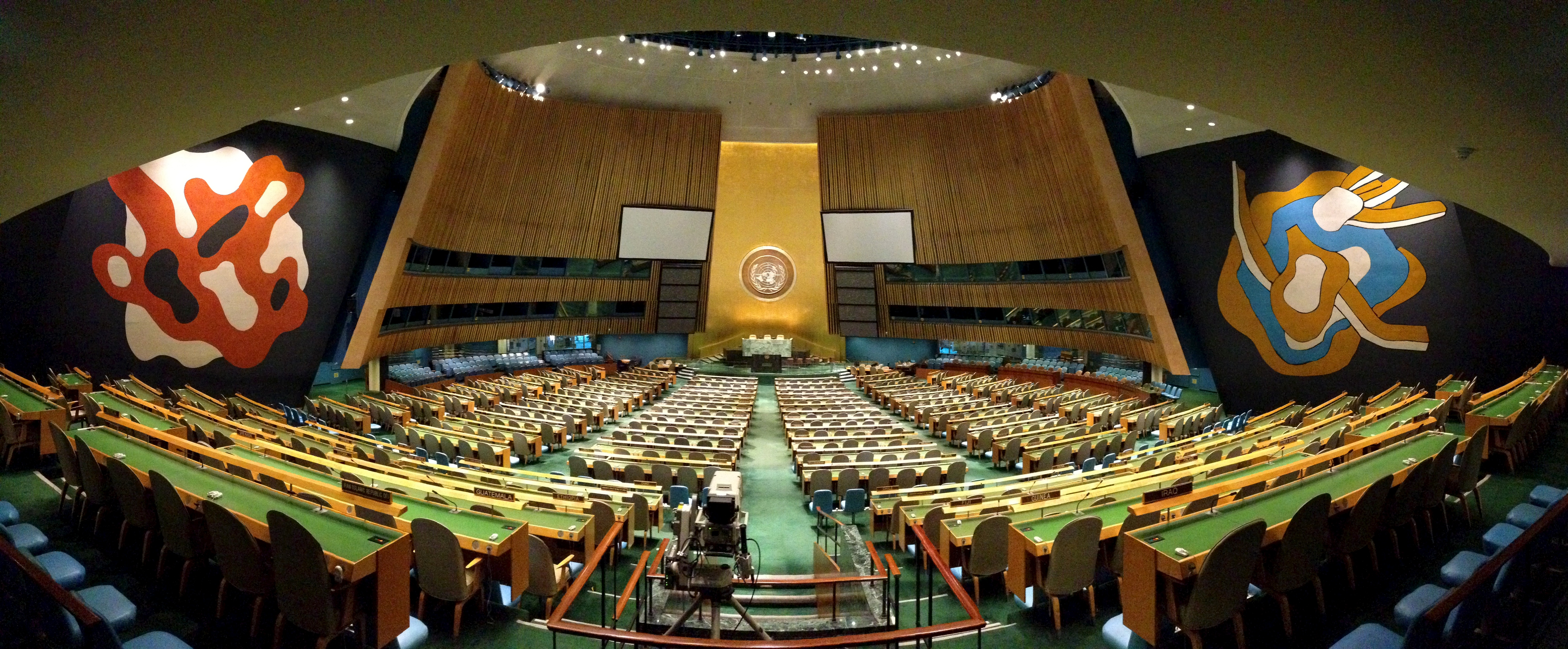
Panorama of the UNGA

The General Assembly subsidiary organs are divided into five categories: committees (30 total, six main), commissions (six), boards (seven), councils (four) and panels (one), and working groups and "other."

=== Committees ===
==== Main committees ====
The main committees are ordinally numbered, 1–6:

- The First Committee: Disarmament and International Security is concerned with disarmament and related international security questions
- The Second Committee: Economic and Financial is concerned with economic questions
- The Third Committee: Social, Cultural, and Humanitarian deals with social and humanitarian issues
- The Fourth Committee: Special Political and Decolonization deals with a variety of political subjects not dealt with by the First Committee, as well as with decolonization
- The Fifth Committee: Administrative and Budgetary deals with the administration and budget of the United Nations
- The Sixth Committee: Legal deals with legal matters

The roles of many of the main committees have changed over time. Until the late 1970s, the First Committee was the Political and Security Committee and there was also a sufficient number of additional "political" matters that an additional, unnumbered main committee, called the Special Political Committee, also sat. The Fourth Committee formerly handled Trusteeship and Decolonization matters. With the decreasing number of such matters to be addressed as the trust territories attained independence and the decolonization movement progressed, the functions of the Special Political Committee were merged into the Fourth Committee during the 1990s.

Each main committee consists of all the members of the General Assembly. Each elects a chairman, three vice chairmen, and a rapporteur at the outset of each regular General Assembly session.

==== Other committees ====
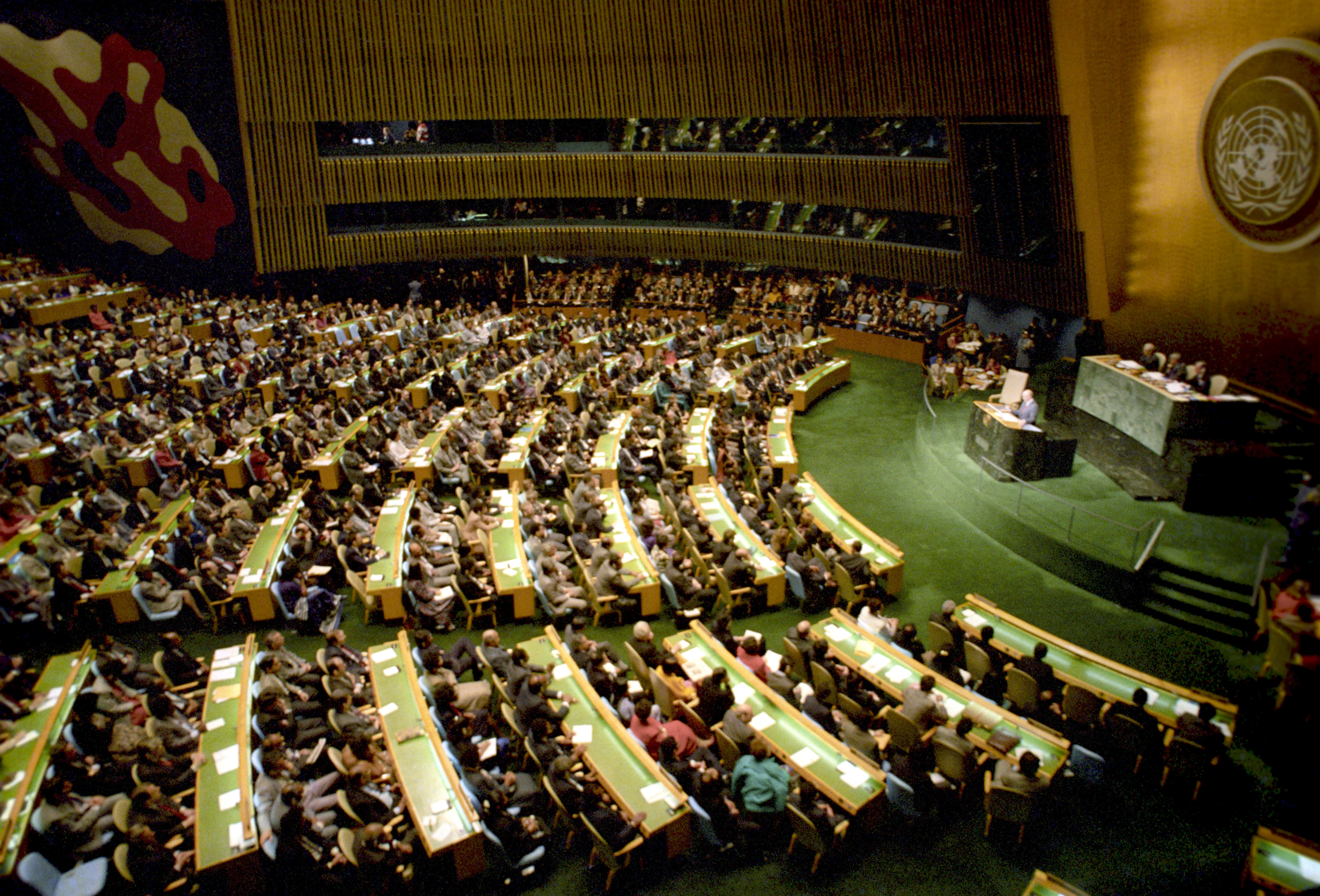
Leader of the Soviet Union Mikhail Gorbachev addressing the UN General Assembly in December 1988

These are not numbered. According to the General Assembly website, the most important are:

- Credentials Committee – This committee is charged with ensuring that the diplomatic credentials of all UN representatives are in order. The Credentials Committee consists of nine Member States elected early in each regular General Assembly session.
- General Committee – This is a supervisory committee entrusted with ensuring that the whole meeting of the Assembly goes smoothly. The General Committee consists of the president and vice presidents of the current General Assembly session and the chairman of each of the six Main Committees.

Other committees of the General Assembly are enumerated.

=== Commissions ===
There are six commissions:

- United Nations Disarmament Commission, established by GA Resolution 502 (VI) and S-10/2
- International Civil Service Commission, established by GA Resolution 3357 (XXIX)
- International Law Commission, established by GA Resolution 174 (II)
- United Nations Commission on International Trade Law (UNCITRAL), established by GA Resolution 2205 (XXI)
- United Nations Conciliation Commission for Palestine, established by GA Resolution 194 (III)
- United Nations Peacebuilding Commission, established by GA Resolution 60/180 and UN Security Council Resolutions 1645 (2005) and 1646 (2005)

Despite its name, the former United Nations Commission on Human Rights (UNCHR) was actually a subsidiary body of ECOSOC.

=== Boards ===
There are seven boards which are categorized into two groups: a) Executive Boards and b) Boards

==== Executive Boards ====
1. Executive Board of the United Nations Children's Fund, established by GA Resolution 57 (I) and 48/162
2. Executive Board of the United Nations Development Programme and of the United Nations Population Fund, established by GA Resolution 2029 (XX) and 48/162
3. Executive Board of the World Food Programme, established by GA Resolution 50/8

==== Boards ====
1. Board of Auditors, established by GA Resolution 74 (I)
2. Trade and Development Board, established by GA Resolution 1995 (XIX)
3. United Nations Joint Staff Pension Board, established by GA Resolution 248 (III)
4. Advisory Board on Disarmament Matters, established by GA Resolution 37/99 K

=== Councils and panels ===
The newest council is the United Nations Human Rights Council, which replaced the aforementioned UNCHR in March 2006.

There are a total of four councils and one panel.

=== Working Groups and other ===
There is a varied group of working groups and other subsidiary bodies.

== Seating ==
Countries are seated alphabetically in the General Assembly according to English translations of the countries' names. The country which occupies the front-most left position is determined annually by the secretary-general via ballot draw. The remaining countries follow alphabetically after it.

== Reform and UNPA ==
On 21 March 2005, Secretary-General Kofi Annan presented a report, In Larger Freedom, that criticized the General Assembly for focusing so much on consensus that it was passing watered-down resolutions reflecting "the lowest common denominator of widely different opinions." He also criticized the Assembly for trying to address too broad an agenda, instead of focusing on "the major substantive issues of the day, such as international migration and the long-debated comprehensive convention on terrorism." Annan recommended streamlining the General Assembly's agenda, committee structure, and procedures; strengthening the role and authority of its president; enhancing the role of civil society; and establishing a mechanism to review the decisions of its committees, in order to minimize unfunded mandates and micromanagement of the United Nations Secretariat. Annan reminded UN members of their responsibility to implement reforms, if they expect to realize improvements in UN effectiveness.

The reform proposals were not taken up by the United Nations World Summit in September 2005. Instead, the Summit solely affirmed the central position of the General Assembly as the chief deliberative, policymaking and representative organ of the United Nations, as well as the advisory role of the Assembly in the process of standard-setting and the codification of international law. The Summit also called for strengthening the relationship between the General Assembly and the other principal organs to ensure better coordination on topical issues that required coordinated action by the United Nations, in accordance with their respective mandates.

A United Nations Parliamentary Assembly, or United Nations People's Assembly (UNPA), is a proposed addition to the United Nations System that eventually could allow for direct election of UN parliament members by citizens all over the world.

In the General Debate of the 65th General Assembly, Jorge Valero, representing Venezuela, said "The United Nations has exhausted its model and it is not simply a matter of proceeding with reform, the twenty-first century demands deep changes that are only possible with a rebuilding of this organisation." He pointed to the futility of resolutions concerning the Cuban embargo and the Middle East conflict as reasons for the UN model having failed. Venezuela also called for the suspension of veto rights in the Security Council because it was a "remnant of the Second World War [it] is incompatible with the principle of sovereign equality of States."

Reform of the United Nations General Assembly includes proposals to change the powers and composition of the U.N. General Assembly. This could include, for example, tasking the Assembly with evaluating how well member states implement UNGA resolutions, increasing the power of the assembly vis-à-vis the United Nations Security Council, or making debates more constructive and less repetitive.

The U.N. General Assembly approved the "Pact for the Future," a plan to address global challenges including climate change, AI regulation, inequality, and conflicts. It calls for reforms to the Security Council, nuclear disarmament, and greater inclusion of youth and women in decision-making. U.N. Secretary-General Guterres urged leaders to act on these commitments.

== Sidelines of the General Assembly ==
The annual session of the United Nations General Assembly is accompanied by independent meetings between world leaders, better known as meetings taking place on the sidelines of the Assembly meeting. The diplomatic congregation has also since evolved into a week attracting wealthy and influential individuals from around the world to New York City to address various agendas, ranging from humanitarian and environmental to business and political.

== See also ==
- History of the United Nations
- List of current permanent representatives to the United Nations
- List of UN General Assembly sessions
- List of General debates of the United Nations General Assembly
- Reform of the United Nations
- United Nations Interpretation Service
- United Nations System
- PassBlue
