= United Nations General Assembly First Committee =

Main committee in the UN General Assembly

- Abbreviation: DISEC, C1, GA First Committee
- Formation: October 24, 1945; 81 years ago
- Type: Principal committee of the United Nations General Assembly
- Legal status: Active
- Purpose: Disarmament, global challenges and threats to international peace and security
- Headquarters: United Nations Headquarters, New York City, United States
- Members: All 193 UN member states
- Head: Chairperson; Lok Bahadur Thapa; Nepal
- Parent organization: United Nations General Assembly
- Subsidiaries: None
- Website: www.un.org/en/ga/first

The United Nations General Assembly First Committee (also known as the Disarmament and International Security Committee or DISEC or C1) is one of six main committees at the General Assembly of the United Nations. It deals with disarmament and international security matters.

The First Committee meets every year in October for a 4–5-week session, after the General Assembly General Debate. All 193 member states of the UN can attend. It is the only main committee of the General Assembly entitled to verbatim records.

== Mandate ==
The work of the committee falls under seven thematic clusters:

- Nuclear weapons
- Other weapons of mass destruction
- Outer space (disarmament aspects)
- Conventional weapons
- Regional disarmament and security
- Other disarmament measures and international security
- Disarmament machinery

== Working methods ==
The work of the committee usually begins in late September and ends by the end of October or early November. The work of the body is split into three stages: (1) general debate, (2) thematic discussions and (3) action on drafts.

During the first stage, the general debate, the committee discusses its agenda items for around eight days. This period of debate is then followed by two weeks of thematic discussions on each of the seven clusters. During this stage, the body hears testimony from high-level officials in the field of arms control and disarmament. It also holds hearings in the form of interactive panel discussions with various representatives from disarmament entities. In the final stage, the body votes on any resolutions or decisions that it has drawn up during its session.

== Reporting bodies ==
The First Committee has two main bodies that report to it: the Disarmament Commission (UNDC) and the Conference on Disarmament (CD). It also hears reports from any expert groups it establishes.

=== Disarmament Commission ===
The Disarmament Commission meets yearly in New York for three weeks hosting both plenary meetings and working groups. The work of the commission is usually divided between two working groups, with each group tackling one topic from the whole range of disarmament issues for that session, one of which must include nuclear disarmament. The commission reports to the General Assembly via the First Committee at least once a year.

=== Conference on Disarmament ===
While the Conference on Disarmament is not formally part of the United Nations machinery, it still reports to the General Assembly annually, or more frequently, as appropriate. Its budget is also included in that of the United Nations. The conference meets in Geneva triannually and focuses on the following issues:

- Cessation of the nuclear arms race and nuclear disarmament
- Prevention of nuclear war
- Prevention of an arms race in outer space
- Effective international arrangements to assure non-nuclear-weapon States against the use or threat of use of nuclear weapons
- New types of weapons of mass destruction and new systems of such weapons including radiological weapons
- Comprehensive programme of disarmament and transparency in armaments.

== Current State ==
In its 81st Session, the committee is focused on disarmament. Specifically:

- Reduction of military budgets
- African Nuclear-Weapon-Free Zone Treaty
- Prohibition of the development and manufacture of new types of weapons of mass destruction and new systems of such weapons: report of the Conference on Disarmament
- Maintenance of international security – good-neighbourliness, stability and development in South-Eastern Europe
- Developments in the field of information and telecommunications in the context of international security
- Establishment of a nuclear-weapon-free zone in the region of the Middle East
- Conclusion of effective international arrangements to assure non-nuclear-weapon States against the use or threat of use of nuclear weapons
- Prevention of an arms race in outer space
- The risk of nuclear proliferation in the Middle East
- Convention on Prohibitions or Restrictions on the Use of Certain Conventional Weapons Which May Be Deemed to Be Excessively Injurious or to Have Indiscriminate Effects
- Strengthening of security and cooperation in the Mediterranean region
- Comprehensive Nuclear-Test-Ban Treaty
- Convention on the Prohibition of the Development, Production and Stockpiling of Bacteriological (Biological) and Toxin Weapons and on Their Destruction
- Promoting international cooperation on peaceful uses in the context of international security

== Bureau ==
The following make up the bureau of the First Committee for the 81th Session of the General Assembly:

| Name | Country | Position |
|---|---|---|
| Lok Bahadur Thapa | Nepal | Chairperson |
| Faisal Abdelazim Salim Mohamed | Sudan | Vice-chair |
| Arsen Kotanjyan | Armenia | Vice-chair |
| Kim Van der Sluis | Netherlands | Rapporteur |

== See also ==
- United Nations General Assembly Second Committee
- United Nations General Assembly Third Committee
- United Nations General Assembly Fourth Committee
- United Nations General Assembly Fifth Committee
- United Nations General Assembly Sixth Committee
