= United Nations General Assembly Fifth Committee =

Committee of the United Nations

- Abbreviation: C5
- Legal status: Active
- Headquarters: New York, United States
- Head: Chairperson; Ibrahim Folorunsho Jimoh; Nigeria
- Parent organization: United Nations General Assembly
- Website: www.un.org/en/ga/fifth

The United Nations General Assembly Fifth Committee (also known as the Administrative and Budgetary Committee or C5) is one of six main committees at the United Nations General Assembly. It deals with internal United Nations administrative and budgetary matters.

== Mandate ==
The Fifth Committee deals with: Member State contributions to the regular and peacekeeping budgets of the organisation, how Member State contributions are allocated, the programme and peacekeeping budgets of the United Nations and human resources issues. It also is responsible for administrative matters, such as: management reform, governance, oversight and accountability issues. Finally, it is responsible for examining all draft resolutions with budget implications before they can head to the Plenary.

== Working Methods ==
The work of the Fifth Committee is split into three sessions:

- A main session lasting from September to December.
- A resumed session in March in which any items not concluded in the main part of the session are considered.
- A second resumed session in May in which the administrative and budgetary aspects of United Nations Peacekeeping are considered.

The work of the Committee begins when reports are introduced in formal meetings, which are followed by discussion in informal meetings. Following these meetings, draft resolutions are created and discussed in informal consultations. There are two readings per draft resolution. If consensus cannot be reached, the resolution is not passed by the committee. However, if there is consensus, the draft resolution is first adopted informally, then tabled by the chair and, finally, formally adopted by the committee. The Committee rarely formally votes as most resolutions are adopted by consensus.

As all draft resolutions with budget implications must be examined by the committee, it is usually the last committee to complete its work, usually in mid- to late-December.

== Reporting Bodies ==
The following bodies report through the Fourth Committee to the General Assembly:

- Advisory Committee on Administrative and Budgetary Questions (ACABQ)
- Board of Auditors
- Committee on Conferences
- Committee on Contributions
- Committee on Programme Coordination (CPC)
- Independent Audit Advisory Committee (IAAC)
- International Civil Service Commission (ICSC)
- Joint Inspection Unit (JIU)

== Current state ==
In its 81st Session, the Committee focused on organizational, administrative and other matters:

- Appointments to fill vacancies in subsidiary organs and other appointments
- Revitalization of the work of the General Assembly
- Financial reports and audited financial statements, and reports of the Board of Auditors
- Review of the efficiency of the administrative and financial functioning of the United Nations
- Programme budget for 2026
- Proposed programme budget for 2027
- Programme planning
- Improving the financial situation of the United Nations
- Pattern of conferences
- Scale of assessments for the apportionment of the expenses of the United Nations
- Human resources management
- Joint Inspection Unit
- United Nations common system
- United Nations pension system
- Administrative and budgetary coordination of the United Nations with the specialized agencies and the International Atomic Energy Agency
- Report on the activities of the Office of Internal Oversight Services
- Administration of justice at the United Nations
- Financing of the International Residual Mechanism for Criminal Tribunals
- Activities arising from Security Council Resolution 1863 (2009)
- Financing of the United Nations Support Office in Haiti
- Administrative and budgetary aspects of the financing of the United Nations peacekeeping operations

The peacekeeping operations that financing are evaluated for are the:

- Interim Security Force for Abyei
- Multidimensional Integrated Stabilization Mission in the Central African Republic
- Peacekeeping Force in Cyprus
- Organization Stabilization Mission in the Democratic Republic of the Congo
- Mission in East Timor
- Interim Administration Mission in Kosovo
- Multidimensional Integrated Stabilization Mission in Mali
- Peacekeeping forces in the Middle East
- Mission in South Sudan
- Mission for the Referendum in Western Sahara

== Bureau ==
The following make up the bureau of the Fifth Committee for the 81st Session of the General Assembly:

Name	Country	Position
Ibrahim Folorunsho Jimoh	Nigeria	Chairperson
Pablo Rodríguez	Dominican Republic	Vice-chair
Costantino Tarducci	Italy	Vice-chair
Noelle Tam	Singapore	Vice-chair
Corina Moroi	Moldova	Rapporteur

== See also ==
- United Nations General Assembly First Committee
- United Nations General Assembly Second Committee
- United Nations General Assembly Third Committee
- United Nations General Assembly Fourth Committee
- United Nations General Assembly Sixth Committee
