= United Nations General Assembly Fourth Committee =

United Nations committee

- Abbreviation: SPECPOL, C4
- Legal status: Active
- Headquarters: New York, United States
- Head: Chair; Coly Seck; Senegal
- Parent organization: United Nations General Assembly
- Website: www.un.org/en/ga/fourth

The United Nations General Assembly Fourth Committee (also known as the Special Political and Decolonization Committee or SPECPOL or C4) is one of six main committees of the United Nations General Assembly. It deals with a diverse set of political issues, including UN peacekeeping and peaceful uses of outer space. However, the issues of decolonization and the Middle East take up most of its time.

== Mandate ==
When it was first created, the Fourth Committee was solely responsible for trusteeship- and decolonization-related matters. However, after independence was granted to all the United Nations trust territories on its agenda, the committee's workload decreased. Consequently, the Fourth Committee was merged with the Special Political Committee, which had been created as a seventh main committee to deal with certain political issues.

The Fourth Committee deals with: items, the effects of atomic radiation, questions relating to information, a comprehensive review of the question of peacekeeping operations, review of special political missions, United Nations Relief and Works Agency for Palestinian Refugees in the Near East, the report of the Special Committee on Israeli Practices and international cooperation in the peaceful uses of outer space.

== Working Methods ==
The Fourth Committee meets every year from late September to mid-November, but also convenes briefly in the spring to adopt any resolutions and decisions relating to peacekeeping passed by the Special Committee on Peacekeeping Operations. All 193 member states of the UN can attend its meetings.

Unlike most other United Nations bodies, there is no general debate at the beginning of the committee's work. The committee also allows for petitioners, i.e. civil society representatives and other stakeholders, to address it on decolonization issues. Finally, the committee usually adopts about 30-35 draft resolutions and several draft decisions annually, usually by consensus.

== Reporting Bodies ==
The following bodies report through the Fourth Committee to the General Assembly:

- Committee on Information
- Committee on the Peaceful Uses of Outer Space (COPUOS)
- Special Committee on Peacekeeping Operations (C-34)
- Special Committee on Decolonization (C-24)
- Special Committee to Investigate Israeli Practices Affecting the Human Rights of the Palestinian People and other Arabs of the Occupied Territories
- United Nations Relief and Works Agency for State of Palestine Refugees in the Near East (UNRWA)
- United Nations Scientific Committee on the Effects of Atomic Radiation (UNSCEAR)

== Current state ==
In its 81st Session, the committee focused on maintenance of international peace and security:

- Effects of atomic radiation
- International cooperation in the peaceful uses of outer space
- United Nations Relief and Works Agency for Palestine Refugees in the Near East
- Israeli Practices Affecting the Human Rights of the Palestinian People and Other Arabs of the Occupied Territories
- Comprehensive review of the whole question of peacekeeping operations in all their aspects
- Comprehensive review of special political missions
- Questions relating to information
- Information from Non-Self-Governing Territories transmitted under Article 73 e of the Charter of the United Nations
- Economic and other activities which affect the interests of the peoples of the Non-Self-Governing Territories
- Implementation of the Declaration on the Granting of Independence to Colonial Countries and Peoples by the specialized agencies and the international institutions associated with the United Nations
- Offers by Member States of study and training facilities for inhabitants of Non-Self-Governing Territories
- Implementation of the Declaration on the Granting of Independence to Colonial Countries and Peoples
- Eradicating colonialism in all its forms and manifestations

== Bureau ==
The following make up the bureau of the Fourth Committee for the 81st Session of the General Assembly:

Name	Country	Position
Coly Seck	Senegal	Chairperson
Fahad Mohammad Alajmi	Kuwait	Vice-chair
Deborah Maria Borg	Malta	Vice-chair
Andrei Nicolenco	Moldova	Vice-chair
Matthew Moxey	Bahamas	Rapporteur

== See also ==
- United Nations General Assembly First Committee
- United Nations General Assembly Second Committee
- United Nations General Assembly Third Committee
- United Nations General Assembly Fifth Committee
- United Nations General Assembly Sixth Committee
