= United Nations General Assembly Third Committee =

Social, Humanitarian & Cultural Committee

- Abbreviation: SOCHUM, C3
- Legal status: Active
- Headquarters: New York, United States
- Head: Chairperson; James Martin Larsen; Australia
- Parent organization: United Nations General Assembly
- Website: www.un.org/en/ga/third

The United Nations General Assembly Third Committee (also known as the Social, Humanitarian, and Cultural Committee or SOCHUM or C3) is one of six main committees at the General Assembly of the United Nations. It deals with human rights, humanitarian affairs and social matters.

The Third Committee meets every year in early October and aims to finish its work by the end of November. All 193 member states of the UN can attend. As in previous sessions, an important part of the work of the committee will focus on the examination of human rights questions, including reports of the special procedures of the Human Rights Council which was established in 2006.

== Mandate ==
The work of the committee focuses on human rights, humanitarian affairs and social issues. In addition, it also considers issues relating to:

- The advancement of women
- The protection of children
- the protection of Indigenous populations, and related issues
- The treatment of refugees, and related issues such as racism and discrimination
- The promotion of fundamental freedoms
- The right to self-determination
- Youth, family, and aging
- The rights of persons with disabilities
- Crime prevention and criminal justice
- The international drug trade, and related issues

== Working methods ==
The work of the Third Committee begins in early October and is usually finished by the end of November.

Unlike most other bodies of the General Assembly, the work of the Third Committee does not begin with a general debate between its members. Instead, its agenda items are debated individually from the beginning of the session.

The Third Committee hosts interactive dialogues with the High Commissioner for Human Rights and the High Commissioner for Refugees each year.

== Current state ==
In its 81th Session, the committee focused on:

A. Promotion of sustained economic growth and sustainable development in accordance with the relevant resolutions of the General Assembly and recent United Nations conferences.

- Social development
- Advancement of women

B. Maintenance of international peace and security

- Report of the United Nations High Commissioner for Refugees, questions relating to refugees, returnees and displaced persons and humanitarian questions

C. Promotion of human rights

- Report of the Human Rights Council
- Promotion and protection of the rights of children
- Rights of indigenous peoples
- Elimination of racism, racial discrimination, xenophobia and related intolerance
- Right of peoples to self-determination
- Promotion and protection of human rights

D. Drug control, crime prevention and combating international terrorism in all its forms and manifestations

- Crime prevention and criminal justice
- International drug control

== Bureau ==
The following make up the bureau of the Third Committee for the 81st Session of the General Assembly:

Name	Country	Position
James Martin Larsen	Australia	Chairperson
Flavia Umulisa	Rwanda	Vice-chair
Jovana Bubanja	Montenegro	Vice-chair
Abosede Hazlewood	Guyana	Vice-chair
Safaa Hijab Yaseen	Iraq	Rapporteur

== See also ==
- United Nations General Assembly First Committee
- United Nations General Assembly Second Committee
- United Nations General Assembly Fourth Committee
- United Nations General Assembly Fifth Committee
- United Nations General Assembly Sixth Committee
