= Standards of Conduct for the International Civil Service =

The document Standards of Conduct for the International Civil Service is a text document of the United Nations System that lays out a set of standards of conduct for international civil servants. These standards were introduced in 2013 by the International Civil Service Commission (ICSC) to replace the Standards of Conduct in the International Civil Service, which had been introduced in 1954 and revised in 2001.

== Development of the standards ==
=== 1954 ===
The report on Standards of Conduct in the International Civil Service by the International Civil Service Advisory Board (ICSAB), which preceded the ICSC, was highly recognized. Still in 1995, it was referred to as "a classic which still today guides the international official".

According to the ICSC Framework for Human Resources Management, standards for ethical conduct "promote common values and define the behaviour and performance expected of international civil servants."

=== 2001 ===
The revised Standards of conduct for the international civil service of 2001 (“2001 standards”), were drafted under the guidance of Mohsen Bel Hadj Amor, chairman of the ICSC, adopted by the ICSC in 2001 and approved by the UN General Assembly in its resolution 56/244 of 24 December 2001.

The standards of conduct for the international civil service are reflected in the Secretary-General’s bulletin on Status, basic rights and duties of United Nations staff members. This bulletin was published with the express purpose of ensuring that all United Nations staff were made aware of the 2001 standards. According to this bulletin, the standards are intended to assist staff members and executive heads of the organizations to understand better the obligations placed on staff conduct by the UN Charter and the UN Staff Regulations and Rules.

It is noted that: "The standards of conduct do not have the force of law as they provide a discussion of expected standards to help staff understand their role as international civil servants rather than a set of binding rules."

=== 2013 ===
The 2013 edition of the Standards of Conduct for the International Civil Service were drafted under the guidance of Kingston Rhodes, then chairman of the ICSC, and approved by the UN General Assembly in its resolution 67/257. Rhodes wrote in his foreword to the 2013 standards:

"Adapted to meet the new challenges of the twenty-first century, the new standards reflect the way in which the world has changed in recent decades and embody the values promoted by the organizations of the United Nations system. These values, which concern fundamental human rights, social justice, the dignity of the human person and respect for the equal rights of men and women, should inspire and guide international civil servants in their professional activities as well as in their personal conduct."

== Related texts ==
The UN Staff Regulations of 1 January 2014, in Article 100, state:

1. In the performance of their duties, the Secretary General and the staff shall not seek or receive instructions from any Government or from any other authority external to the Organization. They shall refrain from any action which might reflect on their position as international officials responsible only to the Organization.
2. Each Member of the United Nations undertakes to respect the exclusively international character of the responsibilities of the Secretary-General and the staff and not to seek to influence them in the discharge of their responsibilities.
