= Noblemaire principle =

Method of determining UN staff compensation

The Noblemaire Principle is the foundational basis used by the United Nations (UN) and its common system to determine the conditions of service and base salary levels for staff in the Professional and higher categories. The primary purpose of the Noblemaire Principle is to ensure that the United Nations can attract and retain the best talent from around the world.

== Background ==
Named after Georges Noblemaire, a French diplomat who chaired a 1921 League of Nations committee on the organization of the Secretariat, the principle establishes that international civil servants should be compensated at a level that allows the organization to recruit from all Member States, including the one with the highest salary levels, and which ensures equal pay for work of equal value regardless of the employee's nationality. Under this framework, the salaries of UN Professional staff are determined by reference to those applicable in the civil service of the country with the highest pay levels, known as the "comparator" civil service. The principle has been codified and administered by the International Civil Service Commission (ICSC), an independent expert body established by the UN General Assembly in 1975 to regulate conditions of service across the UN common system.

By aligning international compensation with the highest-paying national civil service, the UN aims to prevent a situation where citizens of high-income countries are financially disincentivized from joining the international civil service. Human Resources industry data consistently show that professionals generally will not leave their current employer for a new organization without a meaningful salary premium. HR practitioners and career specialists recommend professionals target a standard salary increase of 15 to 25 percent when changing companies. The ICSC regularly reviews UN compensation packages to ensure they remain competitive, arguing that adequate remuneration is essential for maintaining a highly skilled, diverse, and geographically representative workforce capable of executing the complex mandates of the UN system.

Since the inception of the United Nations in 1945, the United States federal civil service has served as the comparator under the Noblemaire Principle. The relationship between UN salaries and the comparator is measured through the net remuneration margin, which compares US federal civil service salaries in Washington, D.C., to UN salaries in New York, adjusted for cost-of-living differences. Over the years, the UN General Assembly has established a target margin range of 10 to 20 percent above the US civil service to account for the expatriate nature of international service and the requirement to recruit globally. As of recent ICSC reviews, the margin is at approximately 17 percent, in the range that market research identifies as the minimum premium professionals typically require before agreeing to change employers.

However, periodic reviews by the ICSC have revealed that several countries now offer civil service compensation packages that exceed those of the US federal civil service, complicating the application of the Noblemaire Principle at the UN. In its mandate to identify the directly comparable national civil service, the ICSC has found that the total compensation packages of both the German and Swiss civil services (in addition to several other countries) are significantly higher than that of the US federal civil service. Despite these findings, the ICSC and the General Assembly have to date retained the United States as the comparator, citing the size, structure, and comparability of the US federal system.
