= Kingston Rhodes =

Former United Nations official

Kingston Rhodes (born 25 October 1942) served as the Chairman of the United Nations International Civil Service Commission (ICSC) until 14 December 2018. Rhodes resigned after an inquiry by the United Nations Office of Internal Oversight Services (OIOS) into accusations of sexual harassment.
