= International Civil Service Commission =

Subsidiary of the United Nations General Assembly

The International Civil Service Commission (ICSC) is a subsidiary body of the United Nations General Assembly, established pursuant to General Assembly Resolution 3357 (XXIX) of 18 December 1974. According to its statute, the ICSC is charged with the regulation and coordination of the conditions of service for the United Nations common system staff.

The ICSC, which has its headquarters in New York City, is composed of fifteen members, appointed by the General Assembly for four-year terms. The fifteen members include the chairman and the vice-chairman as full-time members.

The current Chairman is Larbi Djacta of Algeria and the current Vice-Chairman is Boguslaw Winid of Poland.

== See also ==
- Standards of Conduct for the International Civil Service
