= United Nations General Assembly Building =

Building in Manhattan, New York

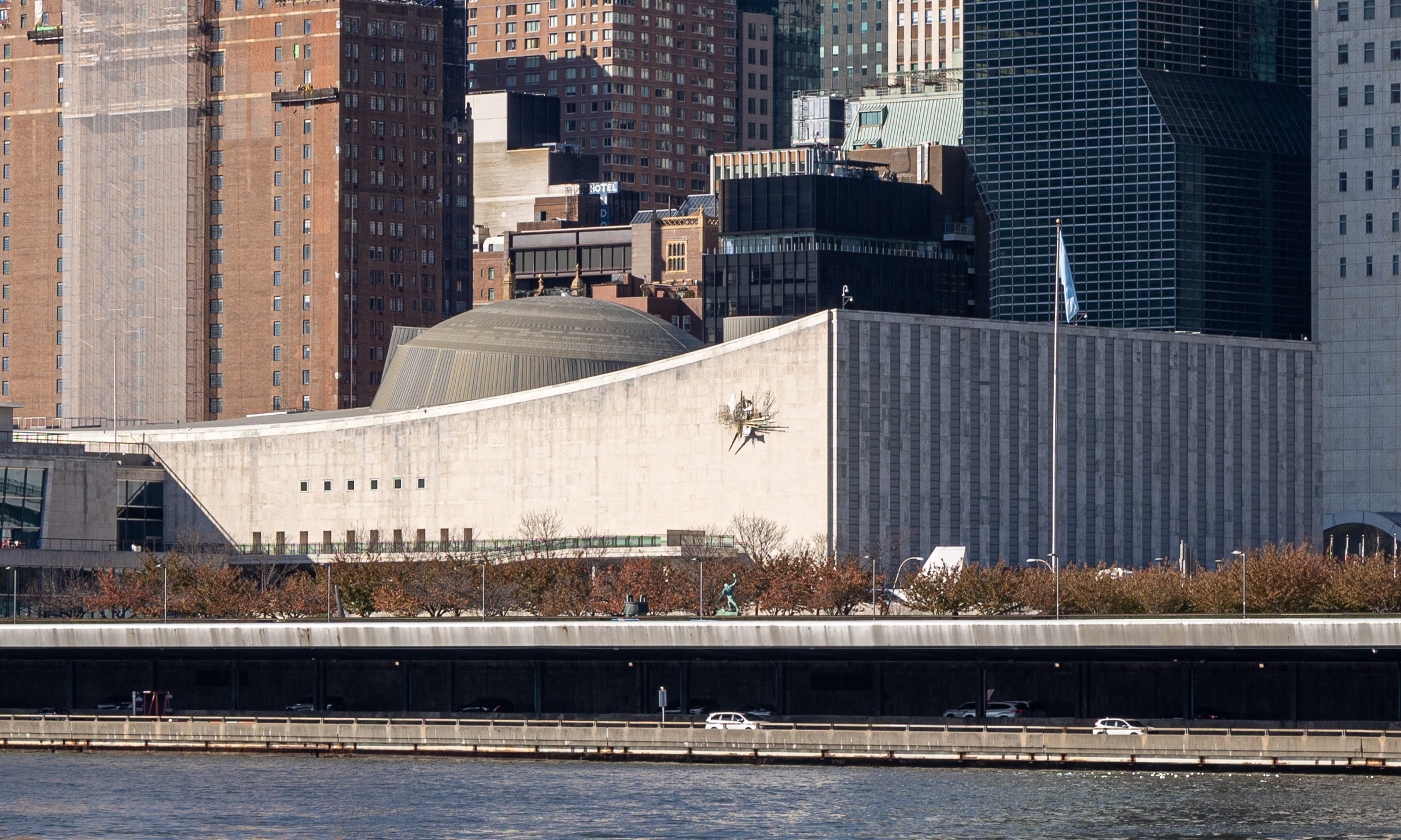
- View of the General Assembly Building from the East River
- Interactive map of the United Nations General Assembly Building area

General information
- Type: Assembly hall
- Architectural style: Modern
- Location: International territory in Manhattan, New York City, United States (host country)
- Coordinates: 40°45′00″N 73°58′04″W
- Current tenants: United Nations General Assembly
- Groundbreaking: September 14, 1948 (complex)
- Construction started: February 16, 1950
- Opened: October 10, 1952
- Renovated: 1978–1979, 2013–2014
- Governing body: United Nations

Dimensions
- Other dimensions: 380 by 160 ft (116 by 49 m)

Technical details
- Structural system: Steel superstructure
- Material: Portland limestone (facade)
- Floor count: 5

Design and construction
- Architects: United Nations Headquarters Board of Design (Wallace Harrison, Oscar Niemeyer, Le Corbusier, etc.)
- Main contractor: George A. Fuller Company; Turner Construction; Walsh Construction Company; Slattery Contracting Company

The United Nations General Assembly Building is part of the headquarters of the United Nations in the Turtle Bay neighborhood of Manhattan in New York City. It contains the main assembly hall of the United Nations General Assembly, the main deliberative, policymaking, and representative organ of the United Nations (UN). The building was designed by a group of architects led by Wallace Harrison. It is connected to the other buildings in the UN headquarters, including the Secretariat Building and the Dag Hammarskjöld Library. Although the building is physically within the United States, it is exempt from some local regulations because the site is under UN jurisdiction.

The General Assembly Building is a four-story structure measuring 380 by 160 ft (116 by 49 m), with concave walls to the west and east, as well as a concave roof with a dome. The building contains a lobby for journalists and the general public to the north, as well as a lobby for delegates to the south. The central portion of the General Assembly Building is the General Assembly Hall, which has a seating capacity of 1,800 and measures 165 ft (50 m) long, 115 ft (35 m) wide, and 75 ft (23 m) tall. Each delegation has six seats in the hall, which face south toward a rostrum and a paneled semicircular wall with booths. The building also contains other spaces, including a delegates' lounge and the president of the United Nations General Assembly's offices on the second floor; a meditation room on the ground floor; and various shops and conference rooms in the basement.

The design process for the United Nations headquarters formally began in February 1947. The General Assembly Building was the third building to be constructed at the headquarters, after the Secretariat and Conference buildings. Construction of the General Assembly Building's steelwork began in February 1950, and the building was formally dedicated on October 10, 1952. The rapid enlargement of the United Nations prompted the UN to modify the hall's layout several times in the 1960s. The General Assembly Hall was closed for renovation from 1978 to 1979 to accommodate additional delegations. The building started to deteriorate in the 1980s due to a lack of funding, and UN officials considered renovating the complex by the late 1990s, but the project was deferred for several years. As part of a wide-ranging project that began in 2008, the General Assembly Building was renovated from 2013 to 2014.

== Site ==
The General Assembly Building is part of the headquarters of the United Nations in the Turtle Bay neighborhood of Manhattan in New York City. It occupies a land lot bounded by First Avenue to the west, 42nd Street to the south, the East River to the east, and 48th Street to the north. Although it is physically within the United States, the underlying land is under the jurisdiction of the United Nations (UN). The site is technically extraterritorial through a treaty agreement with the US government, though it is not a territory governed by the UN. Most local, state, and federal laws still apply within the UN headquarters. Due to the site's extraterritorial status, the headquarters buildings are not New York City designated landmarks, since such a designation falls under the purview of the New York City Landmarks Preservation Commission.

The General Assembly Building occupies the center of the United Nations site, stretching roughly between 44th Street to the south and 45th Street to the north. The building is directly connected to the Conference Building (housing the Security Council) at its southeast, and it also indirectly connects with the United Nations Secretariat Building and the Dag Hammarskjöld Library to the south. The Japanese Peace Bell is just south of the building, and a grove of sycamore trees is planted to the side. On the western part of the site, along First Avenue, are the flags of the UN, its member states, and its observer states. Outside of the UN headquarters, Trump World Tower and the Japan Society are to the northwest, and One and Two United Nations Plaza (including the Millennium Hilton New York One UN Plaza hotel) are to the southwest.

Historically, the site was part of a cove called Turtle Bay. The cove, located between what is now 45th and 48th Streets, was fed by a stream that ran from the present-day intersection of Second Avenue and 48th Street. A creek from the southern end of modern-day Central Park also drained into Turtle Bay. The first settlement on the site was a tobacco farm built in 1639. The site was developed with residences in the 19th century. Slaughterhouses operated on the eastern side of First Avenue for over a hundred years until the construction of the United Nations headquarters. The UN purchased the site in 1946 under the sole condition that it could never slaughter cattle on the land.

== Architecture ==
The General Assembly Building was designed in the International Style by a team of ten architects working under planning director Wallace K. Harrison. The Board of Design comprised N. D. Bassov of the Soviet Union; Gaston Brunfaut of Belgium; Ernest Cormier of Canada; Le Corbusier of France; Liang Seu-cheng of China; Sven Markelius of Sweden; Oscar Niemeyer of Brazil; Howard Robertson of the United Kingdom; G. A. Soilleux of Australia; and Julio Vilamajó of Uruguay. In addition, David Fine of United States Steel oversaw the construction of the General Assembly Building.

=== Form and facade ===
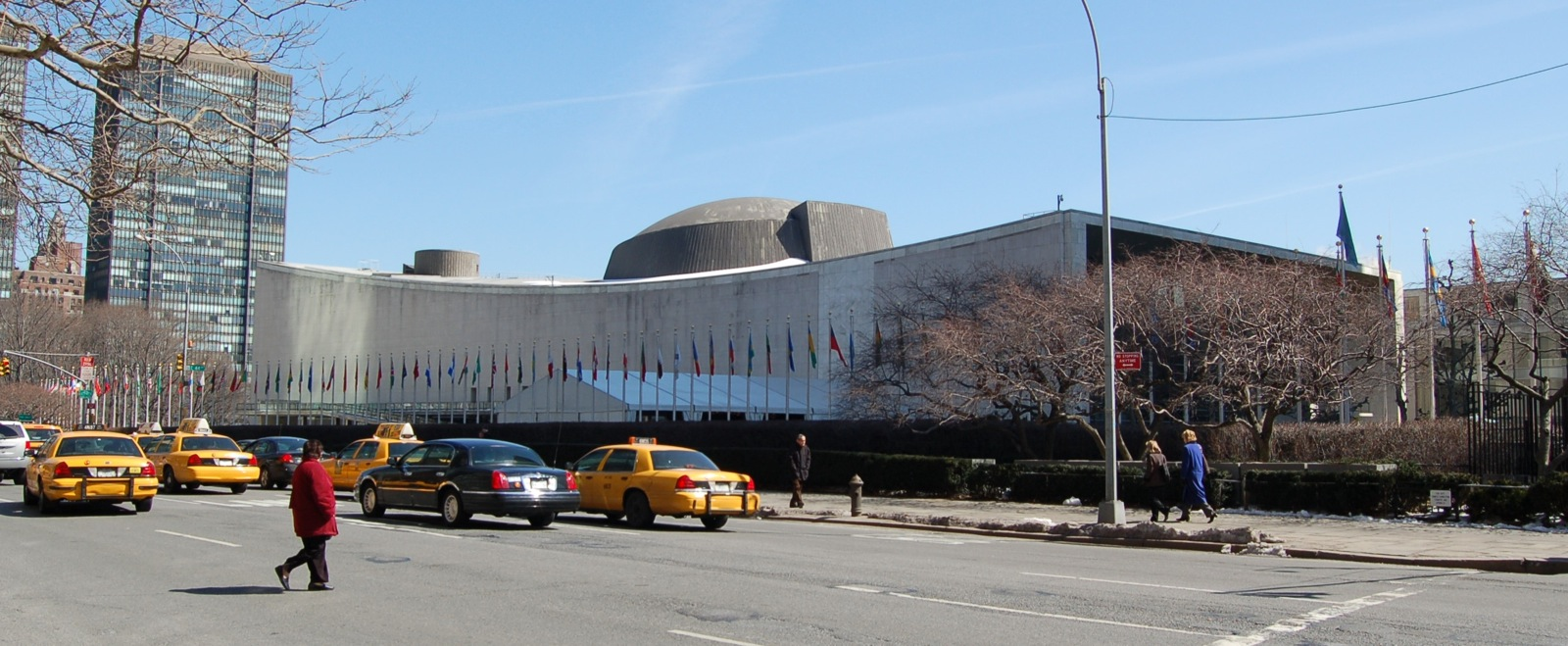
The building as seen from 44th Street, with its shallow dome at center

The five-story massing of the General Assembly Building is shaped similarly to a saddle. The wide western and eastern elevations of the facade curve inward and measure approximately 380 ft (120 m) wide. The roof of the building also curves inward, leading Time magazine to compare the building to a tarpaulin. The narrower northern and southern elevations are flat and measure 160 ft (49 m) wide. There are no windows on First Avenue. The original plans for the building called for the facade to be made of marble, but the facade was ultimately built of Portland stone from England. The facade contains about 12,000 ft^{3} (340 m^{3}) of Portland stone. There is a double-level emergency exit ramp facing First Avenue.

In contrast to the rectangular Secretariat Building, the General Assembly Building has a curving massing; even the walls and floors are not perpendicular. Le Corbusier, who had designed the building's massing, had intended for the curving shape to be the visual focal point of the entire headquarters complex. The center of the building, directly above the General Assembly Hall, contains a shallow dome above it. The building's roof was initially supposed to be an uninterrupted curve, but the dome was added after the chief of the United States Mission to the United Nations had suggested it. According to one account, the inclusion of the dome was intended to convince United States Congress to approve funding for the headquarters more quickly, at a time when there was not much funding available for the project.

The doorways to the General Assembly Building are on the southern and northern elevations of the facade. The south elevation measures about 53.5 ft (16.3 m) tall; it contains glass walls that are recessed within a marble frame and divided by a grid of metal window frames. The north elevation contains vertical marble piers interspersed with photosensitive glass. The architects wanted to create a lighting effect commonly seen in cathedrals, so they made the glass walls translucent. Heating ducts are embedded within these marble piers. The Canadian government donated seven nickel-and-bronze doors, which were installed at the main entrances of the building. Each door measures about 4 ft (1.2 m) wide by about 10 ft (3.0 m) tall. There are four bas relief panels on each door, which depict peace, justice, truth, and fraternity. The southern entrance near 44th Street is used by delegates, while the northern entrance between 45th and 46th Street is used by the public.

=== Interior ===
The building contains three levels of galleries; the delegates use the second level, while the public and members of the media use the first and third levels. The passageways used by journalists and members of the public were physically separated from the passageways used by delegates. In keeping with the UN's international character, the building's interior is decorated with furniture, artwork, and other fittings from around the world. For example, the governments of India and Ecuador donated rugs and carpets, while the Thai government donated seats. The building also contains artwork donated by the governments of Belgium and Brazil, as well as a Foucault pendulum donated by the Netherlands. In addition, the building contained over 3,000 specimens of plants, representing 20 species. The interiors retain some of their 1950s-era design details, such as synchronized office clocks and vintage exit signs.

==== Lobbies ====
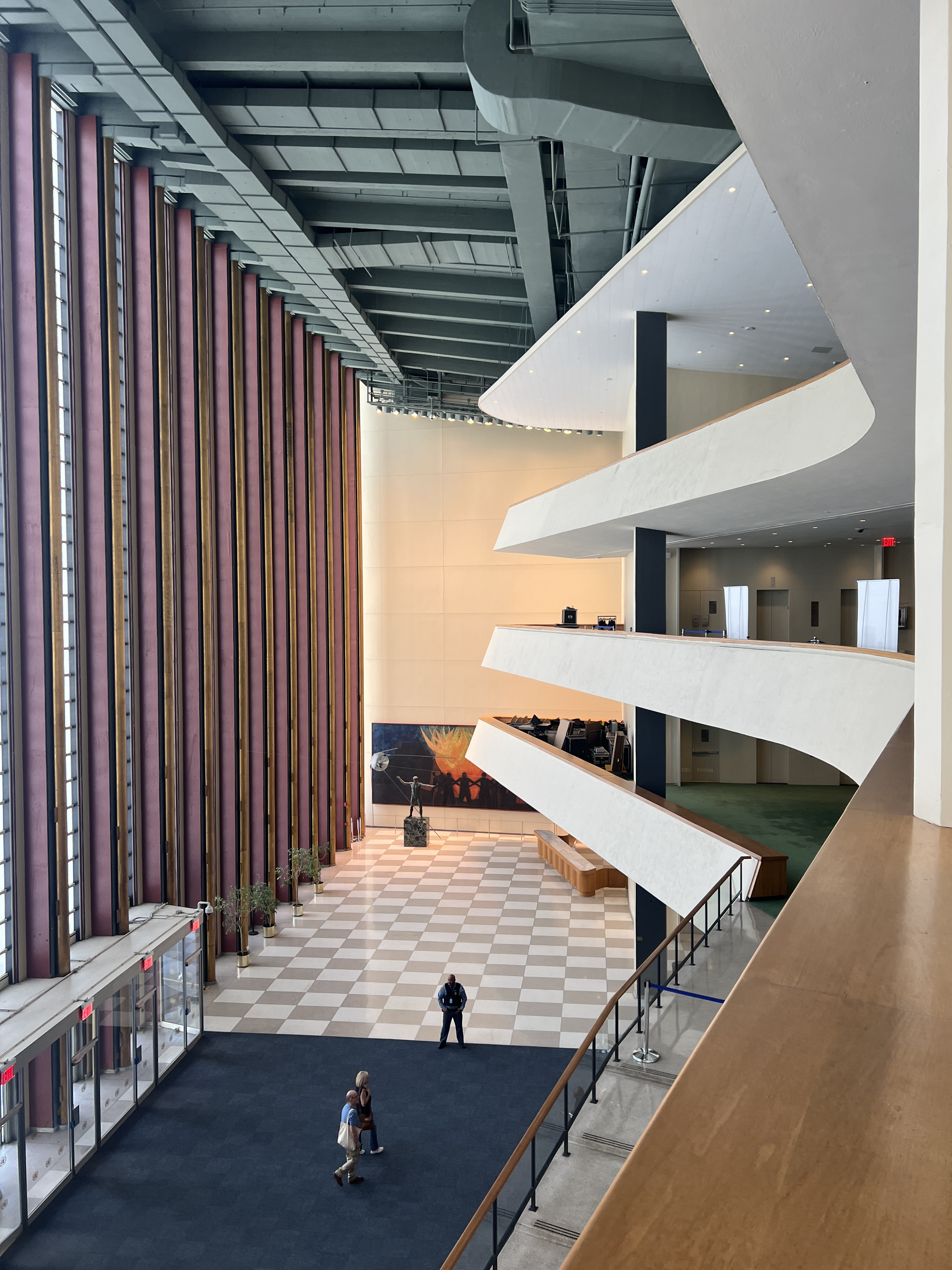
Interior of the north lobby, with the stepped ramp in the background

The north lobby was designed as the entrance for journalists and members of the public. Three balcony levels are cantilevered over the space. The lobby measures 75 ft (23 m) high and is topped by a circular skylight measuring about 4 ft (1.2 m) across. A statue of the ancient Greek god Poseidon, donated by the Greek government, stands in the middle of the lobby. The space also contains a scallop-shaped information kiosk. A stepped ramp leads from the ground level to the first balcony. It contained numerous species of plants, which were illuminated by concealed spotlights. There is a 200 lb (91 kg) Foucault pendulum adjacent to the stepped ramp, donated by the Dutch government. The left (east) wall of the north lobby contains a concourse leading to the south lobby, while the right (west) wall includes a meditation room. The north lobby also contains passageways to meeting rooms, as well as space for exhibits.

The south lobby is the delegates' entrance. There is a hospitality room next to the delegates' lobby, as well as two information desks in that lobby. Directly behind the south lobby's glass facade is a set of escalators for delegates. On the second floor is a tapestry designed by Belgian artist Peter Colfs, entitled Triumph of Peace. The tapestry depicts numerous allegorical figures on a blue-and-green background. Measuring 43 ft 6 in (13.26 m) wide and 28 ft 6 in (8.69 m) high, it was the world's largest tapestry when it was completed. Brazilian painter Candido Portinari also designed War and Peace, a pair of murals on the first floor. Each mural measures 46 by 34 ft (14 by 10 m).

==== General Assembly Hall ====
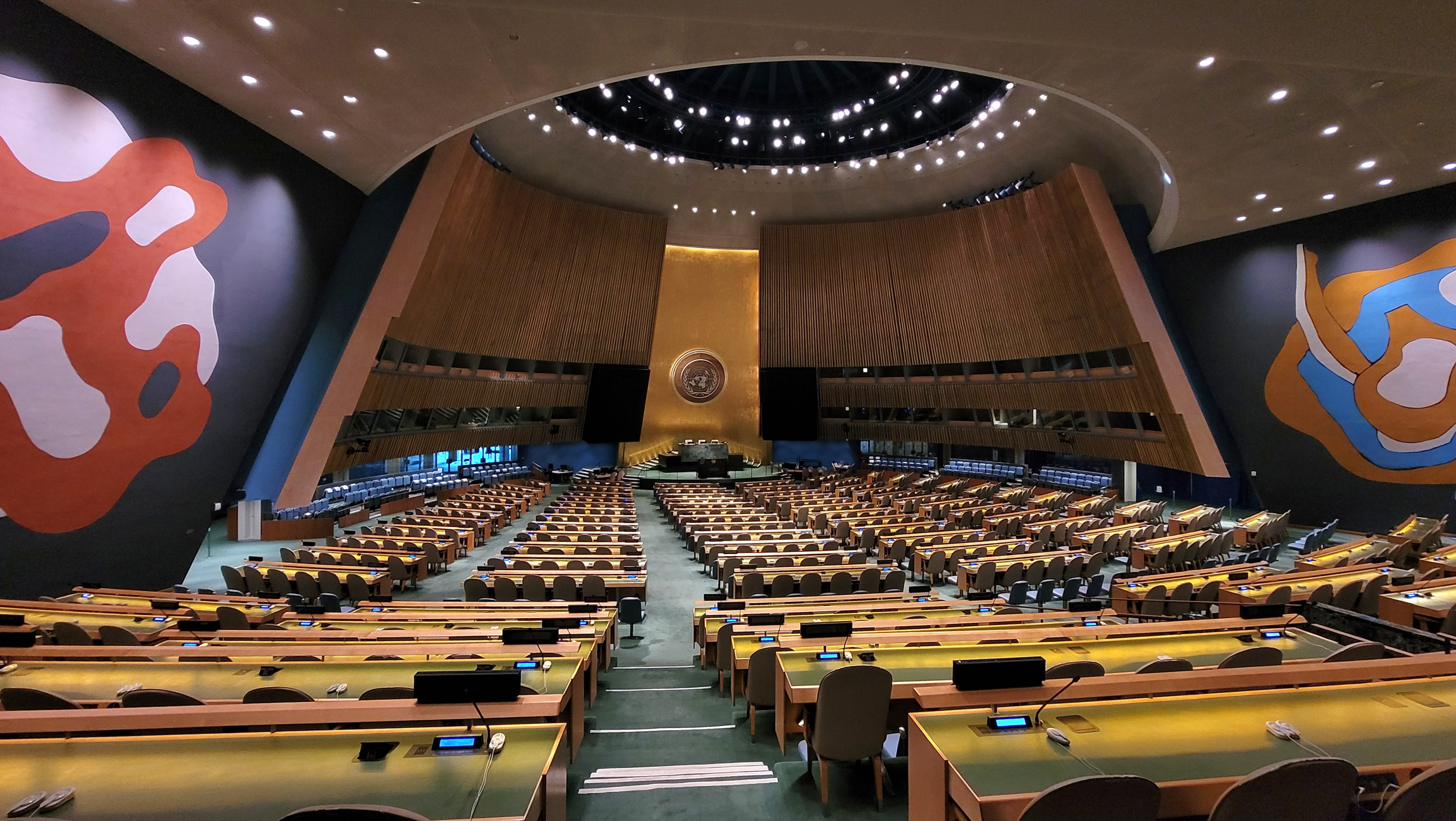
Full view of the hall

The central feature of the building is the General Assembly Hall, which has a seating capacity of 1,800. The room is 165 ft (50 m) long and 115 ft (35 m) wide. The hall occupies the second through fourth stories of the building. During planning, the General Assembly Hall was intended to accommodate 850 delegates, 350 journalists, and 900 members of the public. (Note: According to Progressive Architecture, the building had to accommodate 800 diplomats (80 nations with 5 delegates and 5 advisors each), 300 observers, 320 journalists, and 1,000 members of the public.) As built, the main floor could seat either 636 or 750 delegates, while the booths and balconies within the hall could accommodate 234 journalists and 800 members of the public. By 1977, the hall could accommodate 1,060 delegates and alternate delegates; 160 journalists; 336 members of the public; and 542 advisers or guests of delegations.

===== Rostrum =====
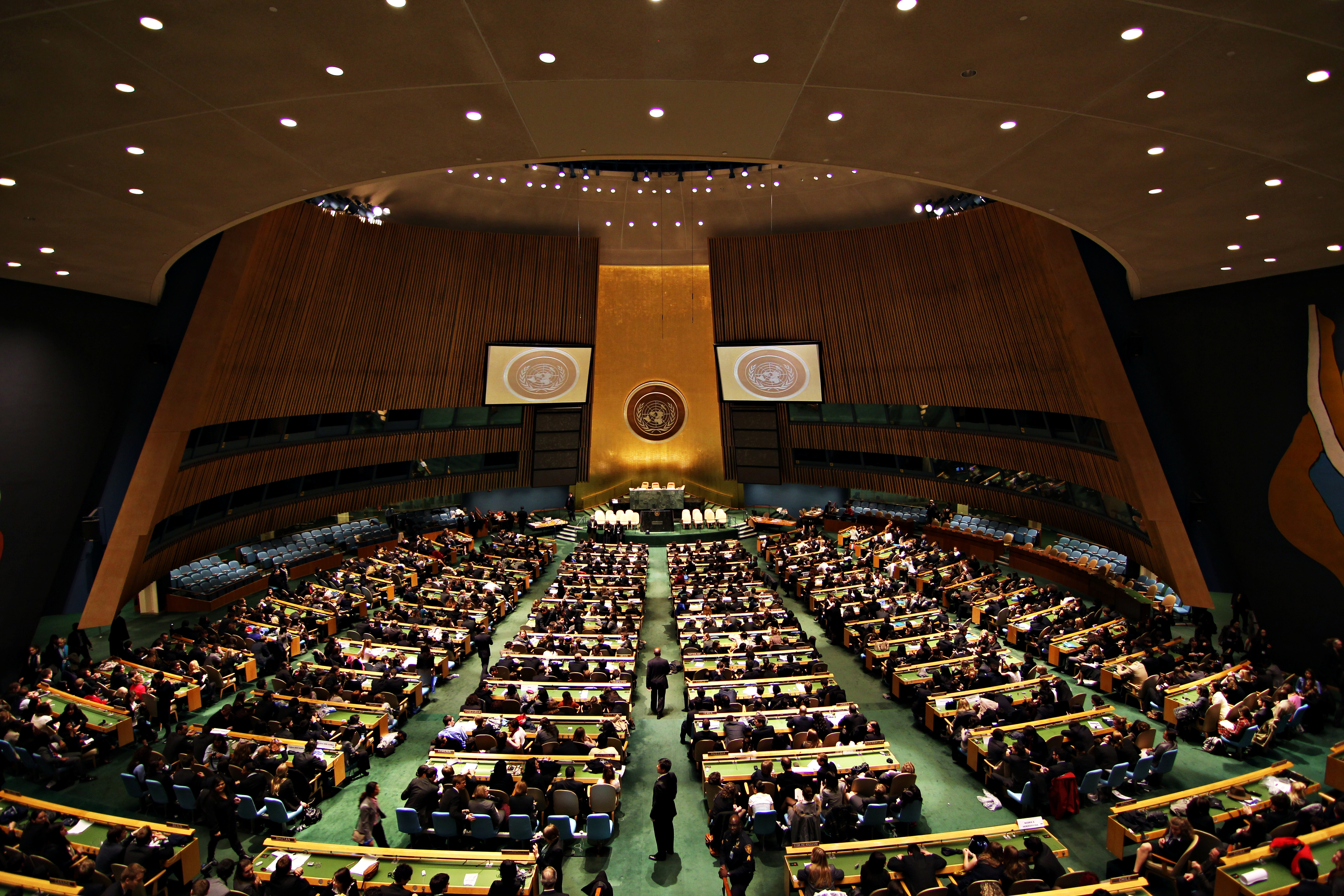
United Nations General Assembly hall, facing the rostrum

At the front (south) of the chamber is the rostrum containing the green serpentinite desk for the President of the General Assembly, the Secretary-General, and the Under-Secretary-General for General Assembly Affairs and Conference Services. There is also a podium designed in a similar style. Behind the rostrum is the UN emblem on a gold background, which is surrounded by shields measuring 3 ft (0.91 m) across. The seal was originally surrounded by disc-shaped lights, but reporters could not take high-quality photos and videos of speakers at the rostrum as a result, so the lights were covered with gold leaf. The south wall of the General Assembly Hall, behind the rostrum, was originally adorned with the seals of countries that were part of the UN in 1952. American artist Bruce Gregory created the seals. The emblems of the UN's 51 original member states would have been mounted in English alphabetical order, while the seals of later additions would have been placed to the sides. Of the 60 seals ordered, 54 were completed before Secretary-General Dag Hammarskjöld scrapped the seals in 1955. The existing seals were removed in 1956.

Flanking the rostrum, in the southern half of the room, is a paneled semi-circular wall that tapers as it nears the ceiling and surrounds the front portion of the chamber. The lower section of the wall is made of a fluted wood (possibly mahogany) with either brass or copper alloy. The wall's upper section is made of acoustic tile. The fluted wood walls were intended to improve the hall's acoustics. The hall is surrounded by two levels of booths for interpreters, the media, and photographers. These booths are placed within the fluted-wood panels; there were initially 34 booths in total. The booths are arranged in a similar layout to a theater in the round but are enclosed. The north balcony of the General Assembly Hall contains a little-used double door with a marble doorway and circular handles. This door is most often used by high officials and royalty, and it leads to a corridor that slopes down steeply to the center of the hall.

The ceiling above the rostrum is a shallow dome measuring 75 ft (23 m) high. The dome is similar to those in buildings constructed for the US federal government. The upper part of the dome is painted in a sky-blue color and is plain in design. Four sets of floodlights surround the dome. In addition, the top of the dome contains a plaster medallion, with a skylight measuring 5 ft (1.5 m) across.

===== Delegates' seats =====
The northern half of the room has a more standard layout, with delegates' seats on the main floor and a balcony surrounding this level. Each delegation sits at a desk facing the rostrum. Each delegate's desk is fitted with a fixed receiver, a microphone control, and buttons for electronic voting. There are also earphones, allowing delegates to listen either to the speakers at the rostrum or to interpreters speaking in one of the official languages of the United Nations. The delegations in the first row are selected randomly each year, and the remaining delegations are seated in English alphabetical order following the delegations in the front row. (Note: For example, in 1952, the Soviet Union (seated under the name USSR), United Kingdom, and United States were seated in the front. The next countries alphabetically were Uruguay, Venezuela, and Yugoslavia, which were seated in the second row. Since Yugoslavia was the last country alphabetically, the third row contained the delegation of Afghanistan, the first country alphabetically. The rearmost row contained the delegation of South Africa, which preceded the Soviet Union alphabetically.) The General Assembly Hall was expanded in 1980, when capacity was increased to accommodate the increased membership. Each of the delegations has six seats in the hall: three beige chairs for full delegates and three blue seats for alternate delegates.

This section contains two murals, which were designed by the French artist Fernand Léger and painted by his student Bruce Gregory. The murals each measure 30 ft (9.1 m) high. The mural on the left wall is painted in orange, gray, and white, while the mural on the right wall is painted in blue, yellow, and white. US president Harry S. Truman called the left mural "Scrambled Eggs" and the right mural "Bugs Bunny". The murals were presented by the American Association for the United Nations on behalf of an anonymous donor. Aline B. Louchheim characterized Léger's murals as "something handsome" and said that each of the murals' different shapes had vitality. The ceiling of the hall lacks decorative finishes and contains recessed lighting.

==== Other first- and second-story spaces ====
On the second floor, directly behind the General Assembly Hall, is the GA 200 room. The room, which spans either 2,000 or 2,500 ft^{2} (190 or 230 m^{2}), contains offices for the Secretary-General of the United Nations and the President of the United Nations General Assembly. The space is used for private meetings with the Secretary-General, and it also contains a press area, offices, and lounge. The wall is decorated with an oil painting by Johannes Kjarval, a gift from the Icelandic government. In 2005, a group of Swiss firms redecorated the space in a minimalist style. The modern design contains walnut-wood walls, a cream-colored carpet, sliding partitions, and custom furniture. The offices for the General Assembly President and the Secretary-General are placed behind the sliding partitions. The room's furniture, walls, and floor contains the word "peace" inscribed in the official languages of the United Nations. In addition, the preamble to the charter of the United Nations is inscribed on the north wall, directly behind the rostrum.

There is a delegates' lounge on the south side of the second floor, which also connects with the Conference Building along the East River. In 1961, The New York Times characterized the room as "the place where understandings on critical matters are often prearranged". The north wall of the delegates' lounge, facing the East River, is made of glass. The lounge contained modern-style furniture such as Ludwig Mies van der Rohe's Barcelona chairs and Florence Knoll's club chairs, and the plants in the room were selected based on whether they could survive wind drafts and tobacco smoke. The lounge originally measured 23 ft (7.0 m) high; a mezzanine was added above the lounge in the 1970s, but the mezzanine was removed in 2013 following a renovation designed by Rem Koolhaas and several Dutch designers. The modern lounge contains a resin bar and information desk, as well as a digital bulletin board to the west. Next to the delegates' lounge is the East Foyer (which connects directly to the south lobby) and the Indonesian Lounge. The Kiswa of the Holy Kaaba, a gift from the government of Saudi Arabia, is hung in the Indonesian Lounge.

The meditation room next to the north lobby can accommodate about 30 people. When the meditation room opened in 1952, it was centered around a 250-year-old African mahogany stump. This was replaced in 1957 with a piece of Swedish iron ore measuring 6.5 short tons (5.8 long tons; 5.9 t), donated by the King of Sweden and the Government of Sweden. The meditation room also contained a fresco by Swedish artist Bo Beskow, which was dedicated in 1957. The meditation room was closed in the 1980s due to vandalism, though it was reopened in 1998. The first story of the General Assembly Building also contains silk-rug portraits of all Secretaries-General of the United Nations, which were donated by Iran in 1997.

==== Basement spaces ====
There is a large conference room and eight smaller conference rooms (originally four) in the basement beneath the General Assembly Hall. The large room can fit about 60 people, while the smaller rooms can fit 40 people each. One of the conference rooms is decorated with wood paneling donated by the British government; each panel depicts an animal, bird, or flower in the United Kingdom. That room, which has 33 seats, is officially labeled as Conference Room 8 but is nicknamed the United Kingdom Room. The governments of Australia and New Zealand also donated wood paneling for the conference rooms.

The basement also has television and radio studios, a sound-recording studio, and a master control room for the United Nations headquarters' communication system. The main TV studio, known as Studio H, is used for both live broadcasts and taped messages; there are also five radio studios. In addition, the basement has several facilities for visitors including a coffee shop, gift shop, stamp sales counter, souvenir shop, and bookstore. The United Nations' Public Inquiries Unit is also housed in the basement.

== History ==
=== Development ===
Real estate developer William Zeckendorf purchased a site on First Avenue in 1946, intending to create a development called "X City", but he could not secure funding for the development. At the time, the UN was operating out of a temporary headquarters in Lake Success, New York, although it wished to build a permanent headquarters in the US. Several cities competed to host the UN headquarters before New York City was selected. John D. Rockefeller Jr. paid US$8.5 million for an option on the X City site, and he donated it to the UN in December 1946. The UN accepted this donation, despite the objections of several prominent architects such as Le Corbusier. The UN hired planning director Wallace Harrison, of the firm Harrison & Abramovitz, to lead the headquarters' design. He was assisted by a Board of Design composed of ten architects.

==== Planning ====
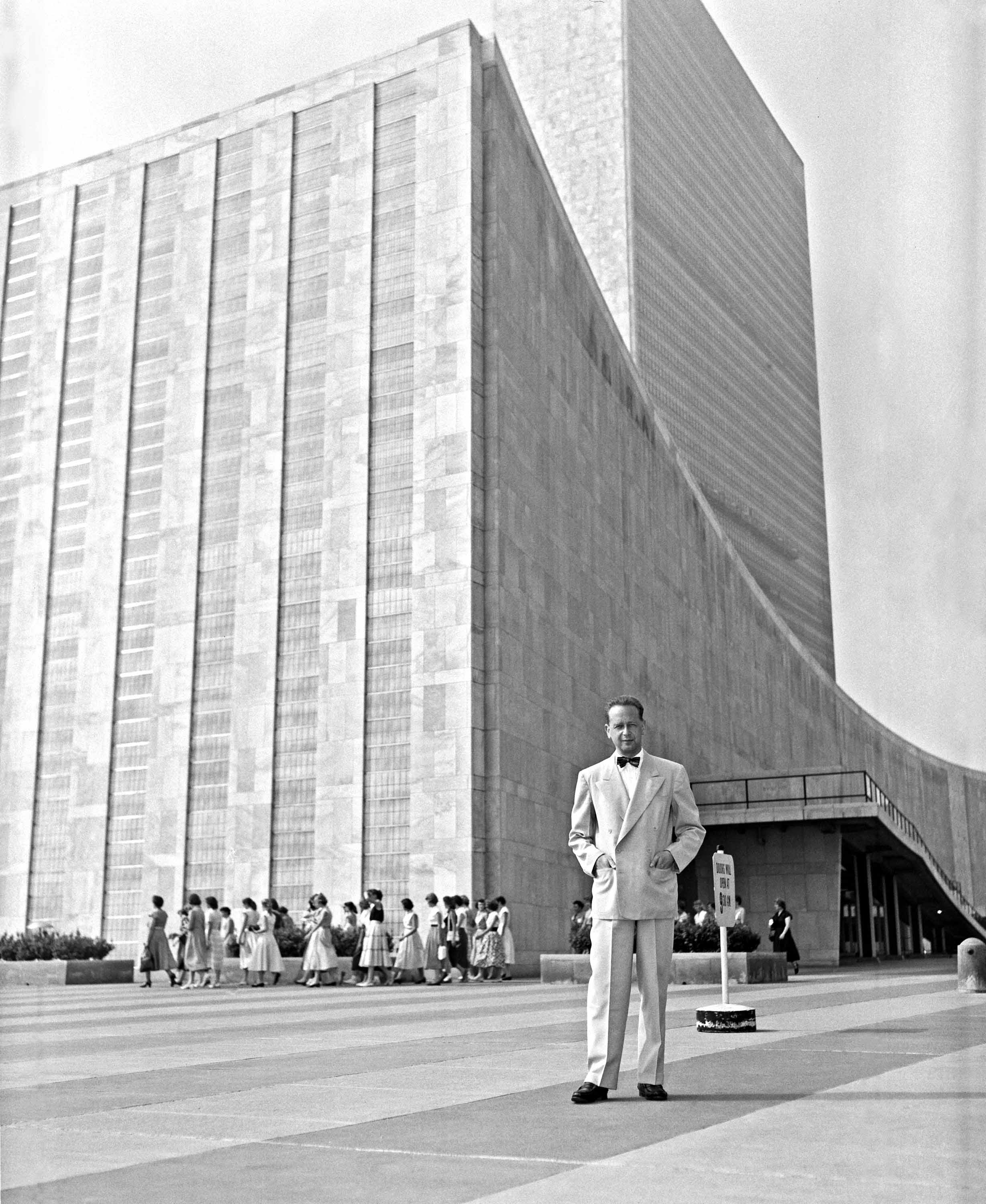
The 2nd Secretary-General of the United Nations, Dag Hammarskjöld, in front of the General Assembly Building with the Secretariat Building in the background

The design process for the United Nations headquarters formally began in February 1947. Each architect on the Board of Design devised his own plan for the site, and some architects created several schemes. All the plans had to include at least three buildings: one each for the General Assembly, the Secretariat, and conference rooms. The plans had to comply with several "basic principles". For instance, the General Assembly Building was to be built on the northern end of the site, opposite the Secretariat Building on the south end. By March 1947, the architects had devised preliminary sketches for the headquarters. The same month, the Board of Design published two alternative designs for a five-building complex, anchored by the Secretariat Building to the south and a pair of 35-story buildings to the north.

After much discussion, Harrison decided to select a design based on the proposals of two board members, Oscar Niemeyer and Le Corbusier. Even though the design process was a collaborative effort, Le Corbusier took all the credit, saying the buildings were "100% the architecture and urbanism of Le Corbusier". The Board of Design presented their final plans for the United Nations headquarters in May 1947. The plans called for a 45-story Secretariat tower at the south end of the site, a 30-story office building at the north end, and several low-rise structures (including the General Assembly Building) in between. The committee unanimously agreed on this plan. In the original plan, the massing of the General Assembly Building had resembled a giant fan.

The project was facing delays by mid-1947, when a slaughterhouse operator on the site requested that it be allowed to stay for several months. The complex was originally planned to cost US$85 million. Demolition of the site started in July 1947. The same month, UN Secretary-General Trygve Lie and the architects began discussing ways to reduce construction costs by downsizing the headquarters. The General Assembly voted to approve the design for the headquarters in November 1947. By the following month, the architects were revising plans for the General Assembly Building, though the rest of the complex was to remain unchanged. The revised plan called for a "wedge-shaped" structure with blank walls. There would have been two auditoriums, which would have faced each other in an hourglass-shaped arrangement, with straight western and eastern walls. The architects eliminated one of the auditoriums to reduce construction costs, but the hourglass-shaped layout of the building was retained, albeit with curved side walls.

==== Construction ====
In April 1948, US president Truman requested that the United States Congress approve an interest-free loan of US$65 million to fund construction. Because Congress did not approve the loan for several months, there was uncertainty over whether the project would proceed. Congress authorized the loan in August 1948, of which US$25 million was made available immediately from the Reconstruction Finance Corporation. Lie predicted the US$25 million advance would only be sufficient to pay for the Secretariat Building's construction, thus delaying the completion of the other buildings. The groundbreaking ceremony for the initial buildings occurred on September 14, 1948, when work on the Secretariat Building commenced. The General Assembly Building would be the third and final major structure in the complex to be completed, with a projected opening date of late 1951. Fuller Turner Walsh Slattery Inc., a joint venture between the George A. Fuller Company, Turner Construction, the Walsh Construction Company, and the Slattery Contracting Company, was selected in December 1948 to construct the Secretariat Building and the foundations for the remaining buildings.

The site had been excavated by February 1949. The project was delayed later that year due to a labor strike by steelworkers. That December, the UN awarded a steel contract for the building to the American Bridge Company. By then, the structure was scheduled to be completed in 1952. The contract, as finalized in March 1950, called for 10,000 short tons (8,900 long tons; 9,100 t) of steel at a cost of US$1.7 million. In response to criticism that the general contracts for the construction of the UN headquarters had been awarded exclusively to American firms, UN officials indicated that they might hire foreign firms to supply materials for the General Assembly Building. That July, the UN awarded a US$11 million contract to Fuller Turner Walsh Slattery Inc. for the construction of the General Assembly Building, as well as the northern half of the UN headquarters' parking lot (directly under the building). At the time, the hall was slated to be completed in time for the sixth session of the General Assembly in 1952.

Construction of the building's steelwork began on February 16, 1951, at which point the basement garage was nearly completed. By that April, workers were rapidly erecting the steelwork for the General Assembly Building. There were significant delays in importing the Portland stone, and only one-fourth of the total stonework had been delivered by May 1951. This led officials to express concern that the building would not be able to host the General Assembly in 1952. In addition, the American Bridge Company said there were difficulties in constructing the steel structure for the dome. All of the stonework had arrived by August 1951. The building was nearly complete by May 1952, when the delegations voted to delay the start of the General Assembly session by one month, allowing workers to install electrical equipment and furnish the interior. The General Assembly Building hosted an architectural exhibition of the United Nations headquarters in June 1952, prior to the building's official opening.

=== Opening and early years ===
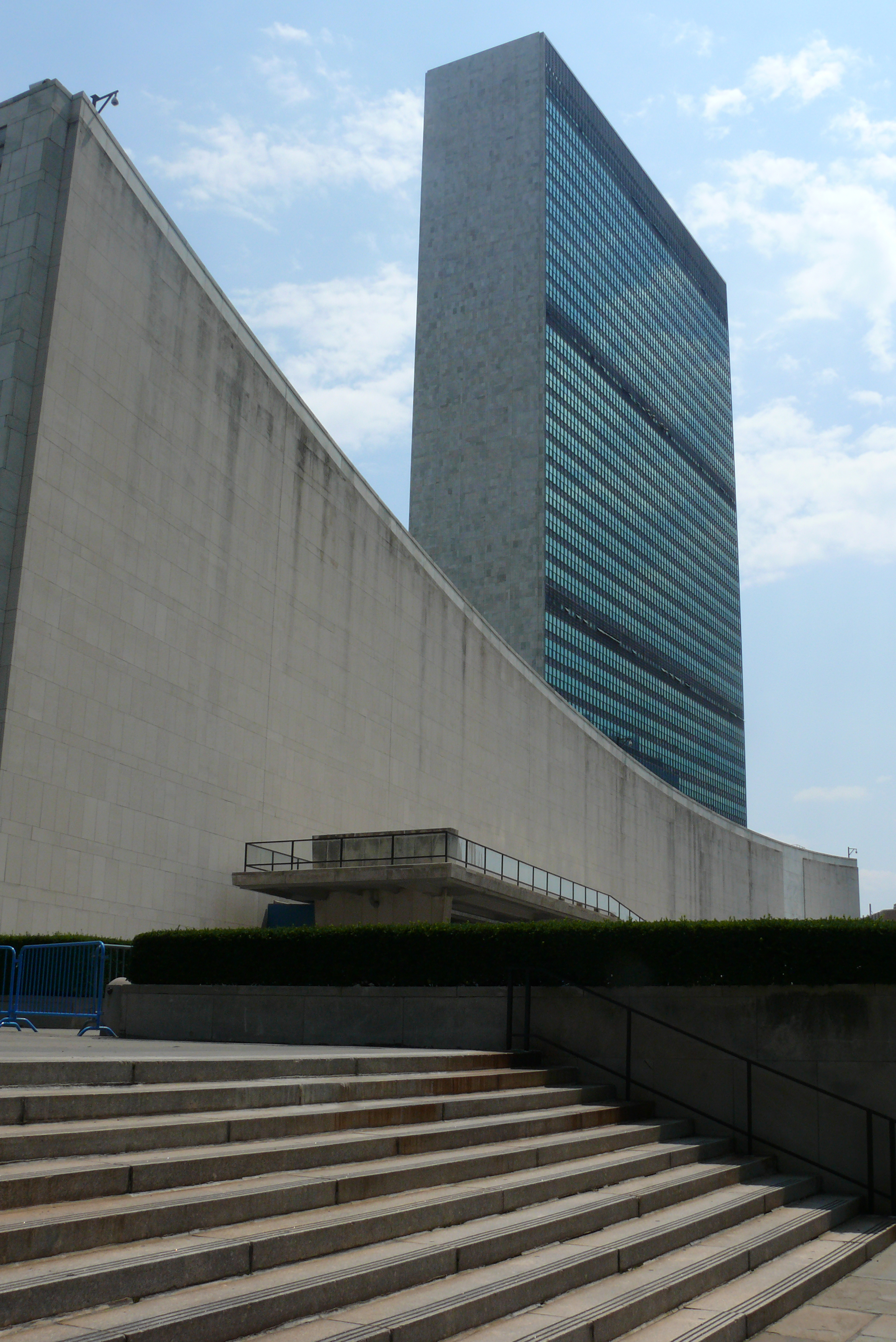
Seen from the northern end of the building, with the Secretariat Building in the background

The building was formally dedicated on October 10, 1952, when Secretary-General Trygve Lie presided over a ceremony there. The event marked the completion of the United Nations headquarters, which had cost US$68 million to construct, about US$3 million over the original budget. The first General Assembly session in the building commenced four days later on October 14. Former US first lady Eleanor Roosevelt dedicated a gift shop in the General Assembly Building's basement the same day. The General Assembly Hall could fit 90 delegations, more than enough to accommodate all 60 UN members at the time of the building's completion. The New York Times wrote in 1954: "It is taken for granted here that there will continue to be a considerable amount of waste space in the hall for some time to come." The American Association for the United Nations started conducting guided public tours of the headquarters when the General Assembly Building was completed. The guided tours were highly popular, attracting 250,000 guests during six months in 1953.

UN officials installed a temporary meditation room next to the north lobby in late 1952, although a lack of funds prevented the installation of a permanent room. The UN built a security checkpoint next to the north lobby in February 1953, and Columbia University Press began operating the bookshop in the building's basement later that year. Under the tenure of Secretary-General Dag Hammarskjöld, the General Assembly Building also began hosting concerts on United Nations Day and other special occasions; the first such concert took place on United Nations Day in 1954. The UN dedicated Peter Colfs's Triumph of Peace tapestry at the building that October. A coffee shop in the basement opened in August 1954 as part of a US$380,000 renovation of the basement, and the seals in the Assembly Hall's rostrum were removed that year. The meditation room next to the north lobby was remodeled in February 1957, and Candido Portinari's War and Peace murals were dedicated at the building that September.

=== UN expansion ===
By 1957, the UN had 82 member states and was expanding rapidly. UN officials planned to replace portions of the observers' seating areas with seats for delegates. At the 1960 meeting of the General Assembly, Hammarskjöld had proposed a wide-ranging renovation program costing US$7.7 million, but this was not executed due to a lack of funds. Instead, the UN commenced a smaller renovation of the General Assembly Hall and the adjacent Conference Building in June 1960, which was estimated to cost US$100,000. The UN removed over 100 observers' seats and installed desks for six additional delegations. The work was completed in August 1961. The same year, Abstract Sculpture by American artist Ezio Martinelli was mounted on the eastern elevation of the building's facade. Prior to the 1962 General Assembly session, the UN reduced the size of the journalists' galleries so the hall could accommodate 108 delegations. Even so, there was so little space that some delegates had to sit in the journalists' seating area during the 1962 meeting.

The UN's planners had concluded that the headquarters could not fit additional delegations without undergoing significant renovations. To fit the new delegations, Secretary-General U Thant proposed either moving the journalists' seating areas or reducing each delegation to five seats. In late 1962, the General Assembly's budgetary committee approved plans to install microphones for delegates and to expand the hall's seating capacity to accommodate 126 delegations, though the committee rejected a more expensive proposal to expand the headquarters. Following complaints that the hall's cramped layout made it difficult to conduct roll call votes, the General Assembly started testing an electronic voting system in 1964. The UN also renovated the hall for US$3 million the same year. The work included reducing the number of seats for each delegation from 10 to 6; relocating the journalists' seating areas to make way for delegates' seating; and dividing part of the basement to create a TV studio and additional office space.

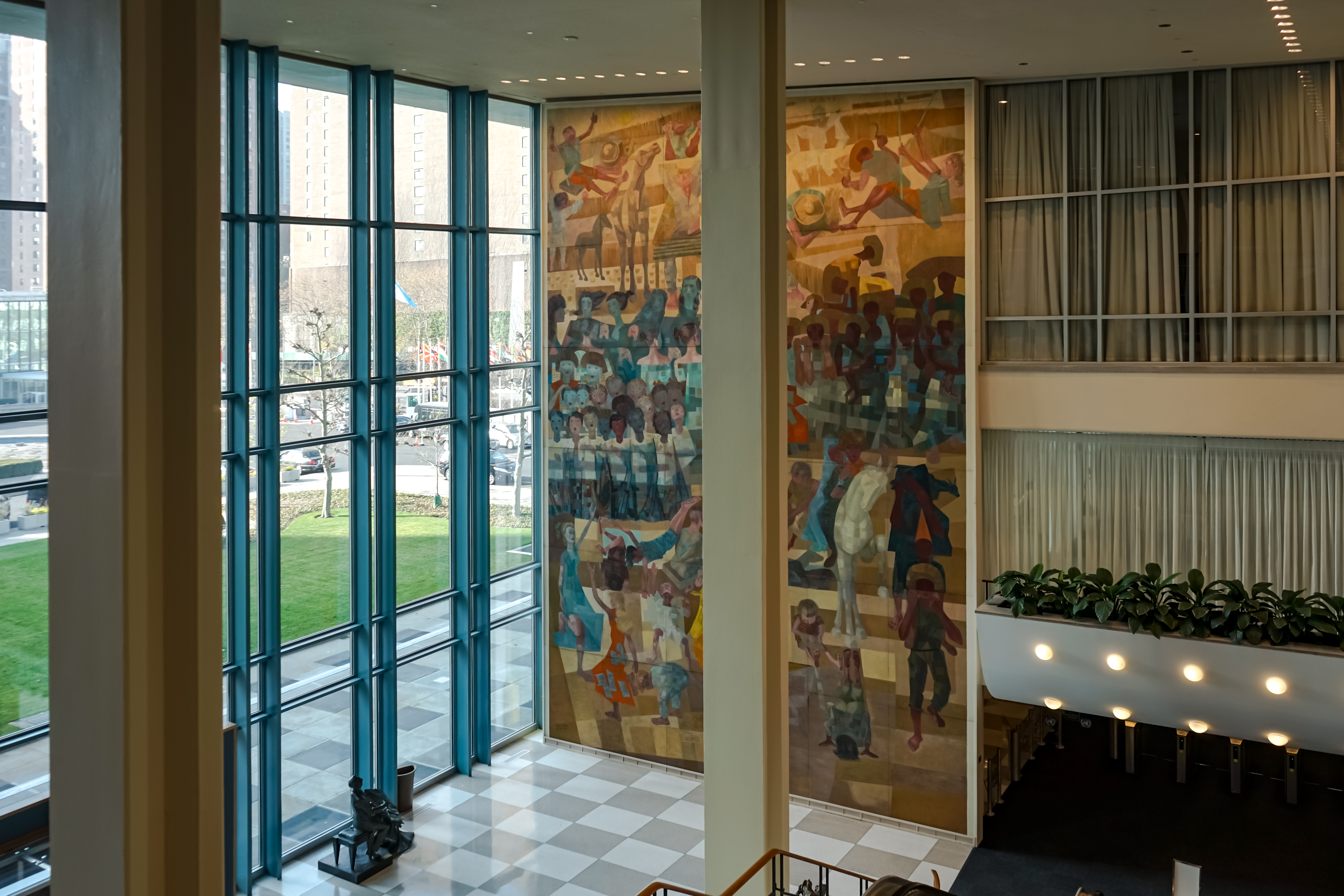
South lobby of the General Assembly Building

The UN continued to expand through the 1970s, further straining its physical facilities. By 1977, the General Assembly was considering expanding the Assembly Hall to accommodate up to 178 delegations. A bronze bust of the composer Pablo Casals, who had performed at the General Assembly Hall twice, was dedicated in the north lobby the same year. The Fuller Company began expanding the General Assembly Hall in January 1978 as part of a US$26 million renovation of the entire complex, designed by Harrison & Abramovitz. Workers installed new wiring under the concrete floors, and the UN hired a Canadian company to refurbish the delegates' chairs, since the manufacturer of the original chairs no longer existed. The first phase of the renovation was completed in September 1979, prior to the opening of the General Assembly session. The expanded hall could fit up to 182 delegations. The renovation project as a whole was completed by 1981.

All nations were given six General Assembly seats regardless of how large their delegations were. Some of the smaller delegations had as few as one member and always left several seats empty, while other delegations had to alternate their seats between dozens of members. Smoking was initially allowed in the entire complex, but the General Assembly banned smoking in some of the building's smaller rooms in 1983. At the time, people were still allowed to smoke within the General Assembly Hall and in private offices. The General Assembly typically only met between September and December, but the UN continued to host tours of the hall throughout the year. In addition, the delegates' cafeteria and the basement shops were open to tourists.

=== Renovation and 21st century ===
Due to funding shortfalls in the 1980s, the UN diverted funding from its headquarters' maintenance fund to peacekeeping missions and other activities. By 1998, the building had become technologically dated, and UN officials considered renovating the headquarters. The mechanical systems were so outdated that the UN had to manufacture its own replacement parts. The New York Times wrote that "if the United Nations had to abide by city building regulations [...] it might well be shuttered". At the time, the UN had proposed renovating the building for US$800 million, as UN officials had concluded that the long-term cost of renovations would be cheaper than doing nothing. The UN's proposed budget for 1999 included US$22 million for fixing the roofs of the General Assembly Building and other structures in the UN complex. The UN commissioned a report from engineering firm Ove Arup & Partners, which published its findings in 2000. The report recommended renovating the UN headquarters over a six-year period, including the General Assembly Hall. The UN could not secure funding for the project at the time.

After Switzerland joined the UN in 2002, the Swiss government renovated the GA 200 room behind the General Assembly Hall's rostrum, which was rededicated in 2005. In addition, Ranan Lurie's mural Uniting Painting was temporarily installed in the north lobby in 2005, marking the first time that the UN allowed a large-scale independent art installation at its headquarters. The UN decided to renovate its existing structures over a seven-year period for US$1.6 billion. Louis Frederick Reuter IV originally designed the renovation, but he resigned in 2006 following various disputes between UN and US officials. Michael Adlerstein was hired as the new project architect. Engineering firm Skanska was hired to renovate the Secretariat, Conference, and General Assembly buildings in July 2007. At that point, the cost of the project had risen to US$1.9 billion.

The renovation of the United Nations headquarters formally began in 2008, though other buildings were renovated first; the same year, the General Assembly banned smoking in the remainder of the General Assembly Building. The complex was retrofitted with various green building features as part of the project. The General Assembly Building was closed for renovations on May 31, 2013. During the project, the General Assembly met at a temporary building on the UN headquarters' North Lawn. Audio speakers were installed in place of the hall's former ashtrays, which had become obsolete. The project also included cleaning the walls, as well as removing asbestos fireproofing and mercury from the hall. Workers installed an air-conditioning system under the General Assembly Hall's floor and added monitors to the desks. The murals by Fernand Leger were also restored. An ivory sculpture in the north lobby, a gift from the Chinese government, was also removed. When the building reopened in September 2014, it was the last structure in the UN headquarters to have been upgraded to New York City building codes.

== Critical reception ==
When the building was completed in 1952, Architectural Forum wrote that the "new Assembly Hall is almost as different as possible from the expectation raised by its chaste marble shell". According to Architectural Forum, the design of the building "marked an architectural shift—from emphasis on 'function' and structural logic to emphasis on form and the logic of art." The New York Herald Tribune wrote that the roof "provides a dramatic foil to [the headquarters'] rigorous lines". Life magazine characterized the building as having a "clifflike front of marble and glass" along with "pinch-waisted walls", while the South China Morning Post said the building had been likened to a "modern motion picture palace". Architectural Forum spoke in support of the design, saying it had arisen from "a different temper and a different approach from some of the best known modern masters".

Many commentators were highly critical of the design. Architectural Forum wrote: "Only a handful of the critics seemed willing to recognize that perhaps Harrison, a man of many notable accomplishments, might have had some good reason for deviating so far from canons of contemporary architecture." George Howe of the Yale School of Architecture disagreed with Architectural Forum's characterization of the building as "popular baroque", saying: "I should prefer a more analytical adjective. One might call this interior, for example, the legislative phase of modern architecture." Pietro Belluschi of the MIT School of Architecture and Planning was even more direct in his disapproval, saying: "If this is the fruit of 50 years' trial and error in architectural thinking, there is reason to be discouraged." Architectural Forum also interviewed Robert Woods Kennedy, a younger architect who called it "eclecticism turned modern", and Landis Gores, a modernist who said "the ineptness apparent everywhere in the Assembly Building cannot be excused by a counteroffensive against architectural principle". One of the few supporters of the design was Nathaniel A. Owings of the architectural firm Skidmore, Owings & Merrill, who said it was a "very interesting and successful building, with nothing about it that wasn't a logical development of a reasonable research program".

There was criticism that the building's massing did not necessarily reflect its function, which contrasted with many modern architects' views that form follows function. Architectural critic Lewis Mumford said that "one could forgive all the architectural lapses" in the complex when they viewed the buildings from the north. Mumford likened the "billowing forms" of the north lobby's parapets to drawings by German architect Erich Mendelsohn. British journalist Alistair Cooke wrote for The Manchester Guardian that the dome "looks as if it had keeled over in a bog of cement that had failed to harden". The modernist architect Paul Rudolph said "the building is not really a product of the International Style but rather a background for a grade 'B' movie about 'one world' with Rita Hayworth dancing up the main ramp". Rudolph also criticized the fact that the building's exterior did not at all resemble its interior.

The General Assembly Building and its connected structures have been depicted in numerous films such as The Glass Wall (1953) and North by Northwest (1959). The 2005 film The Interpreter was the first to actually be filmed inside the headquarters. During the filming of The Interpreter in 2004, The New York Times wrote that the building "was not an instant hit with the architectural community when it opened in 1952, and it is interesting in light of this latest chapter in its history to see how its detractors chose to put it down".
