= Adlerstein (surname) =

Adlerstein is a surname. Notable people with the surname include:

- Michael Adlerstein, United Nations official
- Yitzchok Adlerstein (born 1950), American Orthodox rabbi
