= War and Peace (Portinari) =

Murals by Candido Portinari at United Nations Headquarters

- Guerra e Paz (Portuguese)
- Artist: Candido Portinari
- Year: 1952–1956
- Type: Oil on wood panels
- Dimensions: 1432 cm × 1066 cm (564 in × 420 in)
- Location: United Nations General Assembly Building, New York City

War and Peace (Portuguese: Guerra e Paz) is a mural diptych (Note: A diptych is a work consisting of two parts intended to be viewed as a whole. A mural painting is created to occupy a wall or another architectural space.) by Brazilian painter Candido Portinari, created between 1952 and 1956 and presented by the Brazilian government to the United Nations (UN) in 1957. The two panels occupy opposite walls in the delegates' lobby (Note: At the UN, delegates are people appointed by the governments of member states to represent them in meetings and negotiations. They may be diplomats, ministers, civil servants, or experts.) of the General Assembly Building at United Nations Headquarters in New York City. Each composition measures approximately 14 by 10 m (46 by 33 ft).

On the lobby walls, the passage from one panel to the other traces two opposing human conditions. The blue of War envelops mothers holding dead children, kneeling groups, shrouded corpses, beasts, and the Four Horsemen of the Apocalypse. The violence has no country, date, or battlefield. There are no soldiers, weapons, or scenes of victory. There are bodies overcome by fear and grief. In Peace, luminous yellows cover work in the fields, the harvest, music, dance, and children's games. Peace is depicted as food, shelter, and communal life. Retirantes (Note: In Brazil, retirantes are people who leave their homeland in search of better living conditions, often to escape drought, hunger, and a lack of work. The subject had appeared in Portinari's paintings since the 1930s.), rural laborers, and children from Brodowski give the murals' international message a vocabulary shaped by Brazilian experience. Delegates encounter War as they enter the building and Peace as they leave. The arrangement places suffering before the Assembly's sessions and the possibility of peace at the end of the passage.

The work grew out of approximately 180 preparatory studies (Note: A preparatory study is a drawing or painting made before the final work. The artist uses it to experiment with figures, gestures, colors, and parts of the composition.) produced over four years. Portinari completed the final panels in nine months, even after receiving medical warnings about poisoning caused by the pigments. He called the ensemble the "work of my life". Before being sent to New York, the murals were exhibited at the Theatro Municipal do Rio de Janeiro. It was the only time Portinari saw them fully assembled. The artist did not attend the unveiling at the UN because of his ties to the Brazilian Communist Party. At the 1957 ceremony, Secretary-General Dag Hammarskjöld called the diptych "the most important monumental work of art donated to the United Nations".

Access to the panels was restricted for decades because they were located in the lobby used by delegations. Their removal during the renovation of United Nations Headquarters allowed them to be restored and publicly exhibited in Brazil and Paris between 2010 and 2014. Hundreds of thousands of people attended the exhibitions before the works were reinstalled in New York. At the second public unveiling ceremony for the murals in 2015, Secretary-General Ban Ki-moon called them "a call to action". Reinstalled in the same lobby, War remains before those entering and Peace before those leaving.

== Commission and production ==
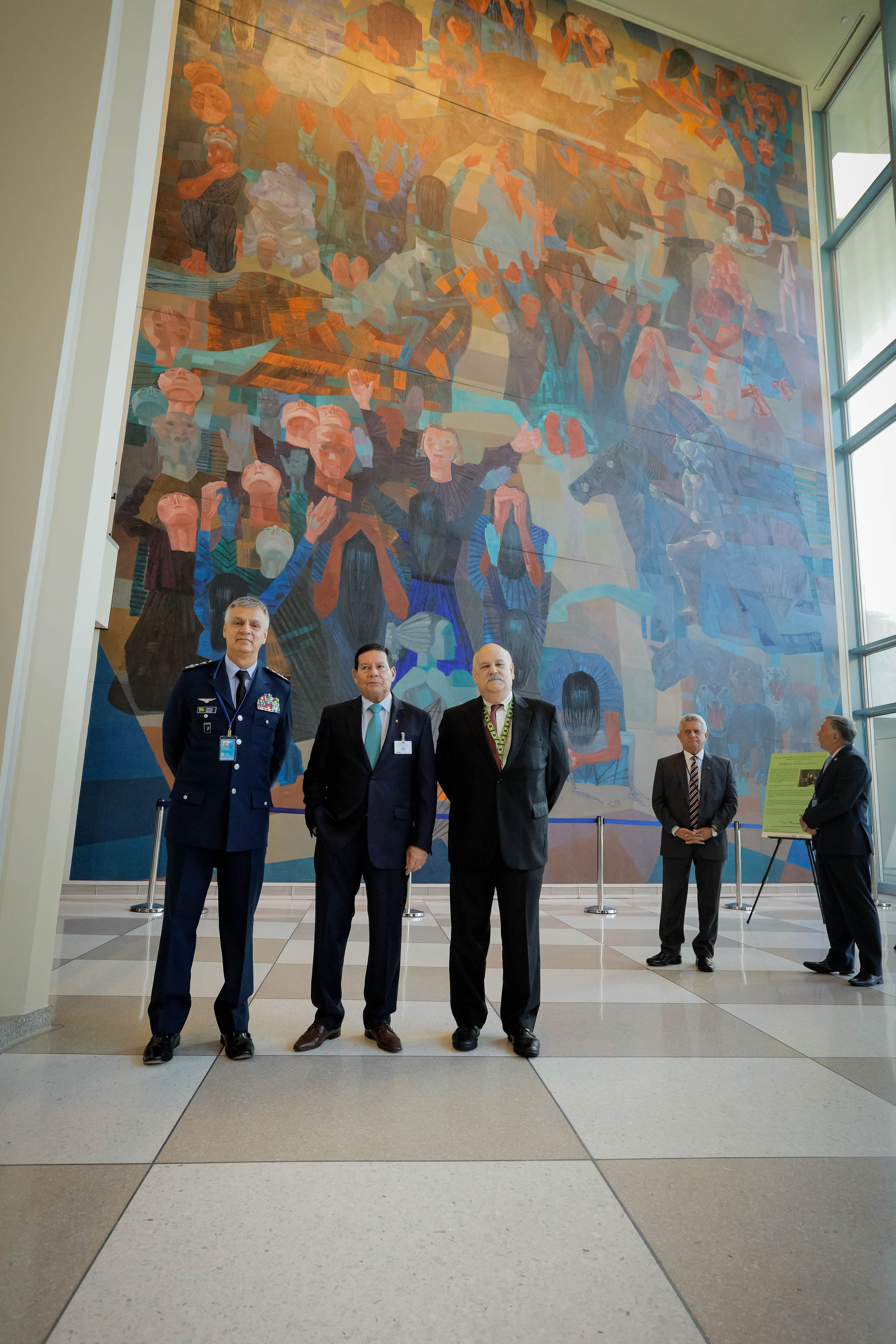
The panels at United Nations Headquarters

The commission for War and Peace originated in the early 1950s, when the Brazilian government decided to present the United Nations with a large-scale work of art. Portinari began his studies for the panels in 1952 and completed the works in 1956. The subject was chosen in keeping with the United Nations' founding purpose after World War II and the organization's commitment to preventing war and promoting peace.

In 1952, while completing a commission for the Banco da Bahia depicting the arrival of the Portuguese royal family in Bahia, Portinari began his studies for War and Peace. The final murals were painted in oil on marine plywood (Note: Plywood consists of thin sheets of wood glued together. The adhesive and manufacturing process used for marine plywood make it more resistant to moisture.) over nine months. Portinari was assisted by the painters Enrico Bianco and Maria Luiza Leão.

Before the panels were sent to New York, President Juscelino Kubitschek opened an exhibition of the works at the Theatro Municipal do Rio de Janeiro in 1956. It was the first and only time Portinari saw the two murals fully assembled. At the opening, Kubitschek presented the artist with the gold medal of the International Fine Arts Council, which had named him the best painter of 1955. Portinari also received Brazil's Guggenheim Award in 1956.

At the opening, Kubitschek presented Portinari with the gold medal of the International Fine Arts Council and declared:

His painting and his art possess such extraordinary force that they could not be contained even within the boundaries of his little Brodowski ...

— Juscelino Kubitschek, Speech at the exhibition opening, 1956

The artist produced approximately 180 preparatory studies over four years and then painted the final panels in nine months. The work was produced during the final decade of the artist's life, when he was suffering the effects of poisoning caused by the pigments he used. Projeto Portinari describes the murals as his most universal contribution.

Portinari's decision to paint the panels despite medical warnings became part of the work's history. While he was developing the preparatory studies, doctors had advised him not to paint because of the risk of renewed poisoning from the paints, but the artist proceeded with the commission.

== Composition and iconography ==
=== Structure of the diptych ===
The two murals were conceived as complementary parts of a single visual statement, but they contrast in their color schemes and expressive effects. In War, cool, dark blues predominate and are associated with melancholy and suffering; in Peace, yellow and other warm, luminous tones prevail over the remaining blues. There is also a compositional difference: although both have a vertical structure, Peace is organized in horizontal bands. According to the critic Israel Pedrosa, the opposition between the "symphony in blue" of War and the golden tones of Peace establishes a tonal counterpoint (Note: Tonal counterpoint is the deliberate contrast between colors and degrees of light and dark. In the murals, the blues of War contrast with the luminous yellows of Peace.) between cataclysm and communal life.

=== War ===
Rather than depicting a particular battle, War eliminates identifiable weapons, soldiers, and specific military episodes and focuses on the consequences of violence for civilians. The figures appear in groups: kneeling, hunched over, with arms raised or hands covering their faces. This arrangement represents a humanity that "weeps together"; suffering is therefore not presented as the isolated experience of a hero or an individual victim, but as collective mourning in which solidarity persists among those affected. The absence of references to a particular conflict also broadens the scene's scope: Portinari does not identify any war, as though all wars were equivalent in their production of horror and dehumanization.

Among the groups of mourners are shrouded corpses and women holding dead children, a motif that Mariani and other interpreters liken to the Pietà (Note: Pietà means "pity" in Italian. In the visual arts, the term refers to images of Mary holding the body of Jesus after the Crucifixion.). Art historian Annateresa Fabris relates the expressive treatment of these figures both to the impact of Guernica and to the Retirantes series, in which Portinari had already addressed child death and displacement. In the UN diptych, however, the mothers no longer belong only to a Brazilian social drama but instead embody pain of universal scope. The threat that produces this suffering is condensed in the lower right corner in the Four Horsemen of the Apocalypse, positioned above beasts and repeated as shadows in other parts of the composition. Their ride is associated with the ideas of conquest, war, famine, and death; the animal figures, in turn, visually extend the notion of predatory violence without turning the mural into a literal narrative of a battlefield.

=== Peace ===
Peace responds to this world through scenes of daily life. The composition brings together rural labor and the harvest, celebrations, music, dance, and children's games. Children ride seesaws, turn somersaults, dance, and sing in a chorus; these activities were conceived to convey the "sweetness of peace". The panel's iconography (Note: Iconography is the set of figures, actions, and symbols used to construct the visual meaning of a work.) is summarized in the triad "work, celebration, and play" and connects the harvest scenes, choruses, and games with memories of life in the countryside. The fellowship of productive work, the ciranda circle dance, and children's games transform peace into a collective experience rather than merely the absence of combat. Recurring motifs in Portinari's work—the rural laborer, childhood in Brodowski, and popular culture—are thus reorganized as images of coexistence, trust, and renewal.

=== Relationship to Guernica ===
Portinari saw Pablo Picasso's Guernica in the United States in 1942. In his later works, he fragmented figures and reduced bodies to the gestures and forms necessary to communicate pain and fear. Portinari employed these devices in the Retirantes series and used them again in War, in the mothers with dead children, the groups of mourners, and the bodies bent by suffering. Mário de Andrade called this approach the assimilation of a "formal solution", (Note: "Formal" in this usage refers to the visual organization of shapes, lines, volumes, and spaces.) without unthinking imitation.

Guernica was created in response to the bombing of the Basque town in 1937. War is not fixed to a particular conflict, territory, or moment. It also eliminates recognizable weapons, soldiers, and military leaders. The panel's range of blues is complemented by the yellows of Peace. The second mural makes room for rural labor, the harvest, music, and children's games. The diptych combines formal devices assimilated from Picasso with characters and subjects that Portinari had already painted in Brazil.

== Installation at the United Nations ==
The murals were presented to the United Nations by the Brazilian government in 1957 and installed on the east and west walls of the delegates' lobby on the ground floor of the General Assembly Building.

Portinari did not attend the inauguration because of his ties to the Communist Party, and Brazil was represented at the ceremony by Ambassador Cyro de Freitas Valle.

For decades, the murals remained in a space used primarily by delegates, diplomats, heads of state, and other officials entering the General Assembly. Their location gave them a symbolically central position at the UN, but did not always allow easy access for the general public.

== Removal, restoration, and exhibitions ==
=== Removal and return to Brazil ===
After more than five decades in the General Assembly Building, the panels showed the effects of exposure and environmental conditions. In 2010, the renovation of United Nations Headquarters required their removal. The murals were dismantled and sent to Brazil for restoration and exhibition.

The panels arrived in Brazil in December 2010 and were displayed for twelve days at the Theatro Municipal do Rio de Janeiro. More than 44,000 people visited the exhibition.

=== Restoration ===
The restoration took place over four months in a studio open to the public at the Gustavo Capanema Palace, then the headquarters of the Ministry of Culture. More than 6,000 people observed the work there.

The War and Peace Project, organized by Projeto Portinari with institutional partners, coordinated the work in Brazil. The team conducted scientific examinations, cleaning, conservation, and documentation of the panels. The cleaning removed accumulated dust and made the colors visible again. The documentation compiled information on the works' materials, technique, and physical condition before their return to the United Nations.

=== Traveling exhibitions ===
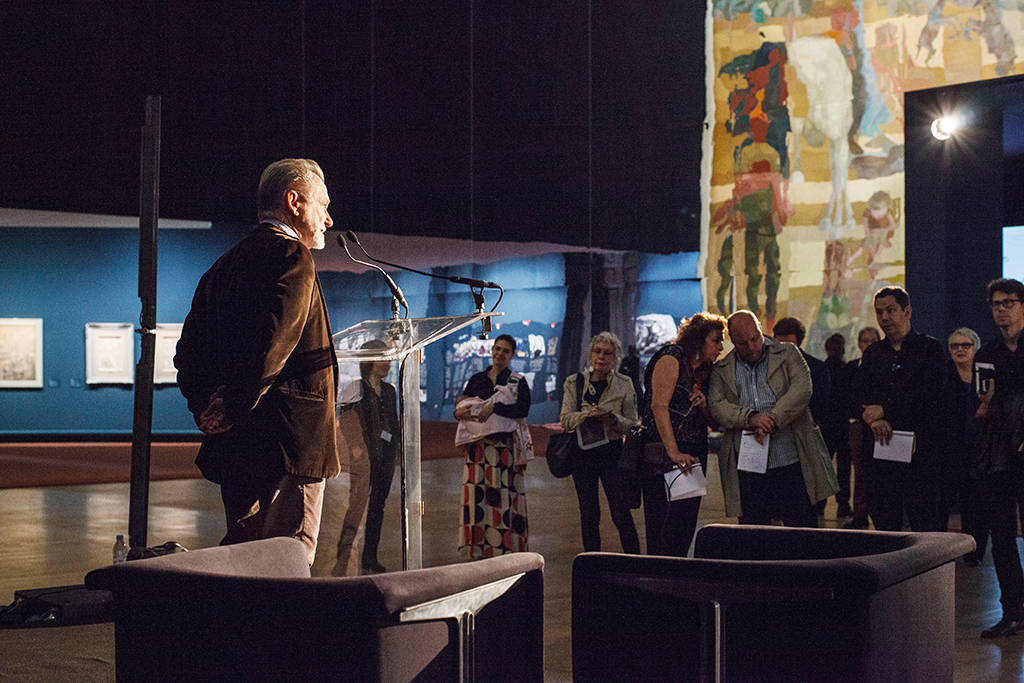
The panels during an exhibition

In February 2012, the restored murals and nearly one hundred preparatory studies were exhibited at the Latin America Memorial in São Paulo. The exhibition remained open for ninety days and received approximately 200,000 visitors.

Between October 2012 and January 2013, the University of Fortaleza presented approximately fifty original preparatory studies.

In October 2013, the murals were exhibited at the reopened Cine Theatro Brasil in Belo Horizonte. More than 80,000 people visited the exhibition over forty days. In May 2014, the panels traveled to the Salon d'Honneur (Note: Salon d'Honneur means "Hall of Honor" in French. It is the name of the Grand Palais's ceremonial and exhibition hall.) of the Grand Palais in Paris, where they received more than 35,000 visitors.

=== Reinstallation at the United Nations ===
The panels returned to United Nations Headquarters and were reinstalled in December 2014. They remained covered in the delegates' lobby until 8 September 2015, when the second unveiling ceremony took place.

In his speech at the ceremony, Ban Ki-moon called the murals "a call to action" and contrasted the "terrible toll of war" with the "universal dream of peace".

== Interpretation and significance ==
War and Peace returns to characters and situations that Portinari had painted since the 1930s. Rural laborers, retirantes, mothers with dead children, and boys from Brodowski reappear under the subjects chosen for the UN. In War, the drought and migration of the Retirantes series give way to the suffering of civilians in a conflict without a date or territory. In Peace, work in the fields, the harvest, and children's games define peace through the possibility of working, eating, playing, and living in a community. The Brazilian subjects remain recognizable, but the figures do not belong to a specific national episode.

Portinari championed mural painting as an instrument of social art. The wall belonged to the community and could tell a story to a broad public. Painting and architecture formed a unified whole outside the private circuit of galleries and collections. In War and Peace, this proposal was applied to a building intended for international negotiation. The subject corresponded to the aim, inscribed in the Charter of the United Nations, of preventing further armed conflicts.

The Brazilian donation was part of the first phase of decorating United Nations Headquarters, when the organization depended on gifts from member states to furnish the new architectural complex. The earliest gifts came mainly from Western Europe and North America. Latin America provided two large-scale gifts during this period: Portinari's murals and a roughly 3,000-year-old Peruvian funerary mantle. The donation brought modern Brazilian painting into the delegates' lobby and expressed the Brazilian government's support for the organization's objectives.

In the General Assembly Building, delegates encounter War as they enter and Peace as they leave. The passage between the two panels places the images along the route to and from sessions and negotiations. The panel devoted to war precedes the entrance to the Assembly. The panel devoted to peace accompanies the exit. The sequence directs the message toward the representatives charged with voting on resolutions and negotiating agreements.

The location created a disparity between the public for whom mural painting was intended and the public that could see it. The lobby was reserved for delegates. For security reasons, UN guided tours did not provide access to the panels. After their removal in 2010, the murals were restored in an open studio at the Gustavo Capanema Palace. Exhibitions in Brazil and Paris gave the public access to the works before they were reinstalled in New York.

== Critical reception ==
The completion of the panels prompted a campaign for them to be shown in Brazil before being sent to New York. Intellectuals, artists, cultural organizations, and labor unions participated in the appeal. The Ministry of Foreign Affairs installed the works on the stage of the Theatro Municipal do Rio de Janeiro, where the exhibition opened on 27 February 1956. Mario Barata wrote in the Diário de Notícias:

Never, anywhere in the world of modern art, has a painter seen his works take the place of the chords of Wagner and Verdi, the fantasy of Chopin's ballets, and the majesty of symphony orchestras. For the first time in the 20th century, a city's greatest theater has become a temple of painting.

— Mario Barata, Diário de Notícias, March 2, 1956

The exhibition received tributes from institutions associated with art education. The University Council of the University of Brazil approved the inclusion of a commendation for Portinari in the minutes of its 8 March 1956, meeting. The proposal came from Alfredo Galvão, director of the National School of Fine Arts.

José Geraldo Vieira objected to one aspect of the installation at the Theatro Municipal. The panels had been placed side by side, although the design for the UN called for opposite walls. Vieira wrote in the magazine Habitat that war and peace should not be seen from the same perspective. His objection focused on the spatial relationship between the works.

At the presentation ceremony at the UN on 6 September 1957, Secretary-General Dag Hammarskjöld called the diptych "the most important monumental work of art donated to the United Nations". He added that the murals gave form to the choice between war and peace made by the world's peoples in the organization's Charter. At the 2015 reinstallation, Ban Ki-moon called the murals "a call to action" and contrasted the "terrible toll of war" with the "universal dream of peace".

The public commissions Portinari received during the governments of Getúlio Vargas gave rise to the label "official painter". Advocates of abstraction also criticized his figurative painting. (Note: Figurative painting depicts recognizable people, objects, or places. In abstract art, colors, lines, and shapes need not reproduce the visible world.) The same paintings gave space to laborers, retirantes, and socially marginalized groups. In the murals depicting economic cycles at the Ministry of Education and Health, manual labor occupied the scenes without the celebratory tone of the official narrative. The commission for War and Peace came from the Brazilian government and was used as a diplomatic gift. The painted figures are civilians affected by war, rural laborers, and children, with no heads of state, generals, or scenes of military victory.

== Legacy ==
The murals are among the most visible works of Brazilian art in an international public institution. Their restoration and reinstallation in the 2010s renewed public attention to Portinari's work and to Brazil's contribution to the United Nations art collection.

War and Peace has also remained central to the work of Projeto Portinari, which uses the murals in educational programs, exhibitions, restoration projects, and public-history initiatives related to the artist's legacy.

== See also ==
- Brazil and the United Nations, the diplomatic relationship that led to the donation
- Candido Portinari, the painter who created the murals
- Modernism, the artistic movement to which Portinari belonged
- Projeto Portinari, the institution responsible for documenting and restoring the work
