= Projeto Portinari =

Project to rescue and present the life and work of Candido Portinari

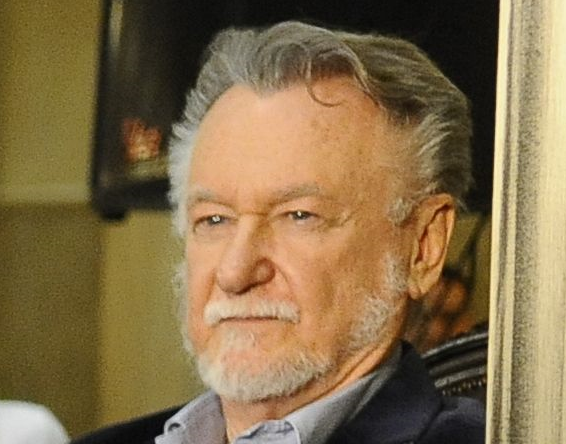
- João Candido Portinari
- Formation: 2 April 1979; 47 years ago
- Founder: João Candido Portinari
- Founded at: Rio de Janeiro
- Legal status: Active
- Purpose: Rescue of Portinari's work and allow "allows the artist's work to serve the greater goal of finding our cultural identity and preserving our national memory."
- Headquarters: PUC-RJ
- Official language: Portuguese
- General-director: João Candido Portinari
- Website: portinari.org.br

The Projeto Portinari (Portinari Project) was established by João Candido Portinari with initial support from FINEP and resources from FNDCT, on 2 April 1979, with the PUC-RJ, for the rescue of Candido Portinari's work and its placing in public access.

== History ==
[...] It is as a Brazilian that I feel it's my duty to work so that all of us may reencounter your work, and through it ourselves.

— João Candido Portinari, Introduction,

=== Historical context ===
In the years after the end of the Brazilian military dictatorship, several initiatives emerged to rescue Brazilian history, with the movement of Diretas Já and the return of those exiled by the dictatorship.

=== Origin ===
In 1967, after 10 years living abroad and taking care of his academic formation, João Candido Portinari returned to Brazil, at the invitation of PUC-RJ to establish the Mathematics Department, of which he became director the following year. As much as at first he preferred to distance himself from his father's work, he came close to seeing that his memory was being forgotten a mere 17 years after the painter's death and impacted after revisiting the Van Gogh Museum in 1978, in the following year within PUC-RJ, he established the Projeto Portinari in an office loaned by Américo Jacobina Lacombe, president from the Fundação Rui Barbosa. In 1980, PUC-RJ finally officially welcomed the project. In the same year, a Globo Repórter documentary about the painter directed by Eduardo Coutinho was made by Rede Globo in partnership with the Portinari Project.

Until that time, as indicated in the O Globo article, Portinari, the painter: A famous unknown, more than 95% from the painter's work was out of public access, and the whereabouts of most of the works were unknown to the extent that the "Museum of Modern Art of New York had more information about Portinari than all the Brazilian institutions gathered", according to the founder.

Initially he based himself on documents from his father and those he inherited from his mother, who had been a memorialist in Portinari's history and for more than a decade Varig has subsidized its international trips. The first 25 years were dedicated to the search of the artist's works in Brazil and beyond, where the project received support from Rede Globo, Correios and Itamaraty. Around 5,400 works were gathered (in 2000, 200 works were considered false and 500 were not located), 25,000 documents and a 130-hour Oral History Program of later digitized interviews and a Catalogue raisonné, whose founder claims to be the first of an artist in all of Latin America, and the South of Ecuador.

After the cataloguing phase, the project started to do educational activities, mainly focused on children and teenagers.

== Projects ==
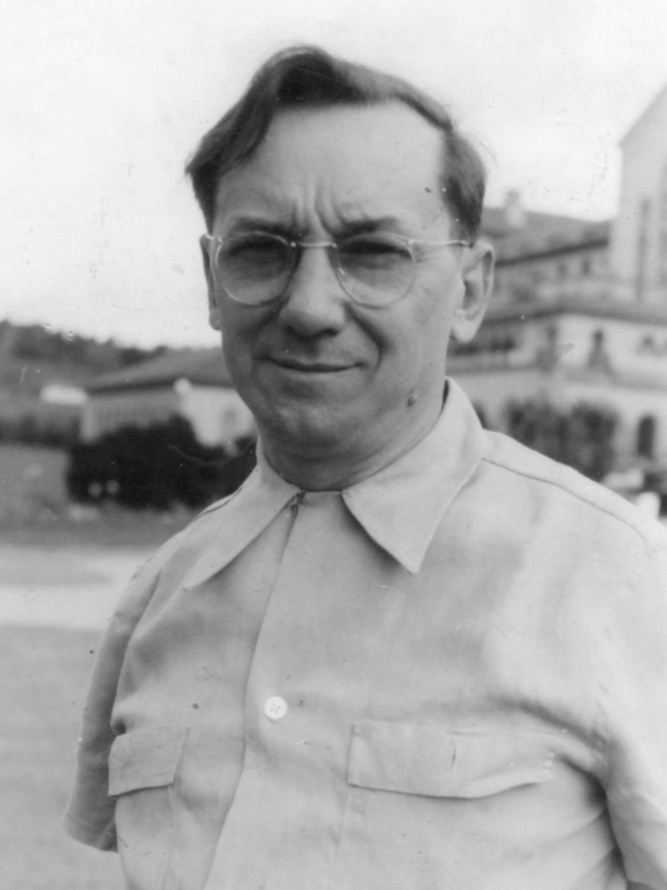
Candido Portinari

Some projects developed involve a virtual museum with Google Arts & Culture the Projeto Pincelada, for the proof of authorship of artistic works, the relaunch of the painter's poetry book the re-launch, after more than 7 decades, alongside Antofágica, of illustrations made for The Posthumous Memoirs of Brás Cubas, O alienista the production of a mini-series supposed to be released in 2021 and even the restoration followed by exposition in Brazil and France of the work War and Peace.

=== Projeto Pincelada ===
Using areas of artificial intelligence, neural networks, among others, the Projeto Pincelada (Brush Project) makes a macro photography of the paintings to establish their authenticity.

Idealized in 1990 by João Candido, the goal was to enrich authorship recognition techniques through the "morphology of the author's brushstrokes" and George Svetlichny, from the Mathematics Department, had the idea to put a sample of brushstrokes in the Autoclass program, developed by NASA and was first presented to the scientific public at Cambridge University by the founder of the Projeto Portinari in 1993.

According to Professor Ruy Luiz Milidiú, the image is divided into several squares of 4mm x 4mm, which should contain the movement of a brush stroke. The first phase of the project was to see if the program could differentiate Portinari's works from Enrico Bianco's, and the second phase was to compare them with the falsifications of Portinari's works.

=== Catalogue raisonné ===
Released in 2004 is a collection of 5 volumes, each representing more than 4,600 works from the painter.

=== Digitization ===
Originally proposed in 1983 and started in 1984, the project has sought to use new technologies to digitize Portinari's collection, after noting the difficulty of preserving the originals.
