= João Candido Portinari =

Brazilian writer and teacher

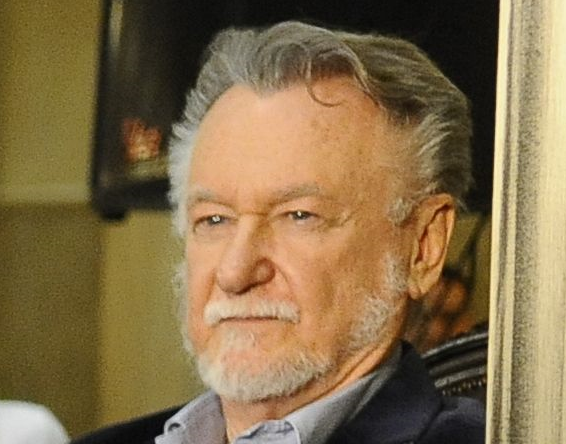
- Born: 1939 (age 86–87)
- Education: Lycée Louis-Le-Grand de Paris (1960); École Nationale Supérieure des Télécommunications (1963); Massachusetts Institute of Technology (1966)
- Occupations: Teacher and writer
- Known for: Founder of Projeto Portinari
- Father: Candido Portinari
- Awards: Prêmio Jabuti de Literatura (2008); Prêmio Sérgio Milliet (2008)
- Executive Director from Projeto Portinari
- 1979 – today
- Website: portinari.org.br

João Candido Portinari (born 1939), is a teacher and Brazilian writer. The only son of Candido Portinari, he is the founder and executive director of the Projeto Portinari and a mathematician with a doctorate in telecommunications engineering.

He was awarded the Prêmio Jabuti in the category "Architecture and Urbanism, Communication and Arts" in 2005, released the Catalogue raisonné of his father's complete work in 2004 and also won the Sergio Milliet Award in 2005.

He has also written several books on Portinari's life and work, especially the book Menino de Brodowski.

== Article ==
- Portinari, João Candido (2000). "Projeto Portinari". Estud. Av. (in Brazilian Portuguese). 14 (38): 369–400. doi:10.1590/S0103-40142000000100021.
