= Brodowski, São Paulo =

Municipality in the state of São Paulo, Brazil

Brodowski Município de Brodowski
- Municipality
- Municipality of Brodowski
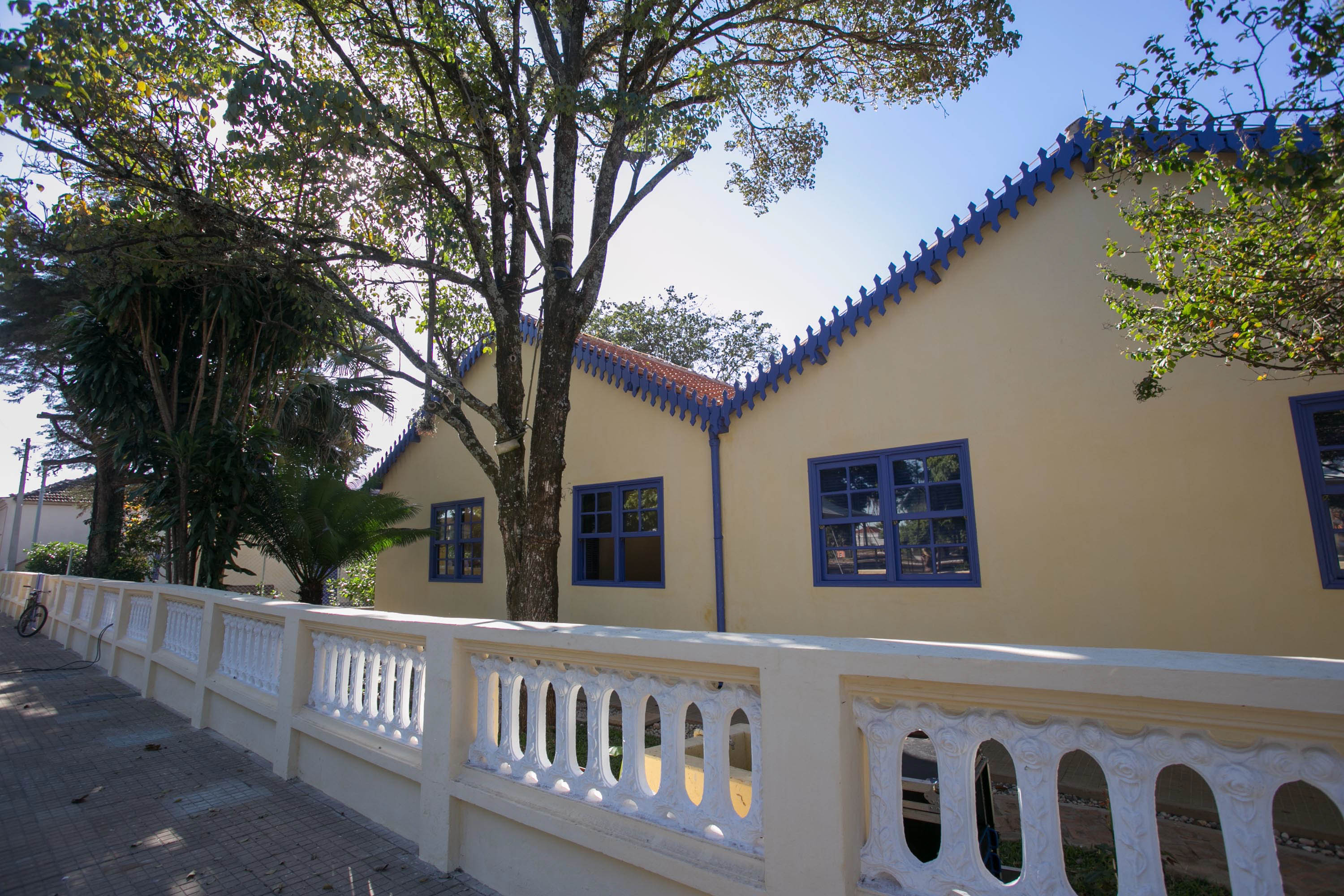
- Museu Casa de Portinari

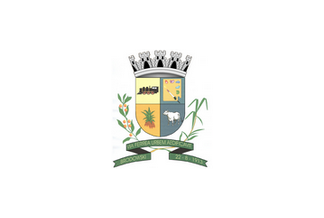
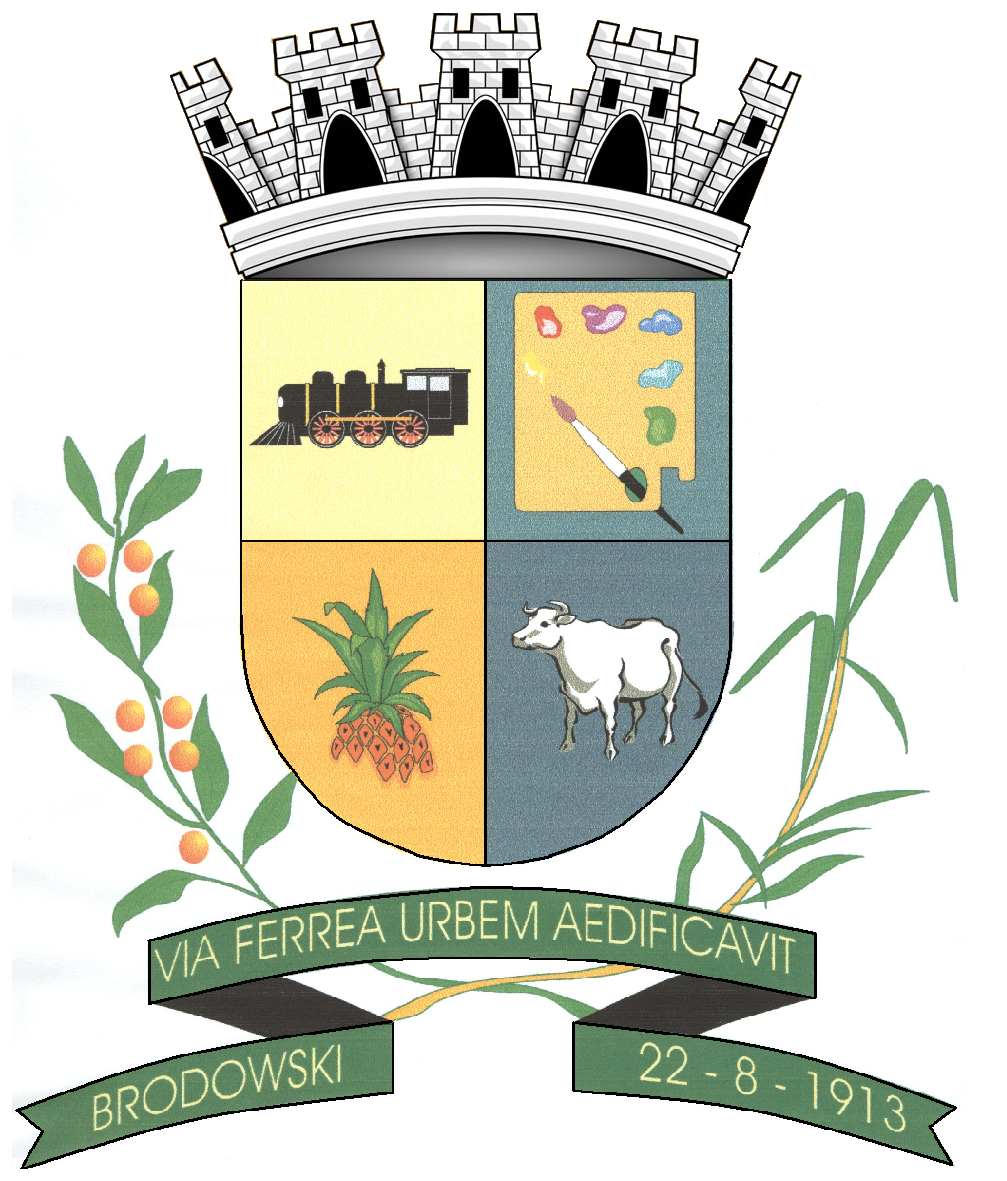
- Flag Coat of arms

- Location in the state of São Paulo

- Location in Brazil
- Country: Brazil
- Region: Southeast
- State: São Paulo
- Intermediate region: Ribeirão Preto
- Immediate region: Ribeirão Preto
- Founded: 5 September 1894
- Municipality: 22 August 1913
- Named for: Alexandre Brodowski

Government
  - Mayor: Fábio Maximiniano Vercezi Severi (PODE, 2025–2028)

Area
  - Total: 278.458 km^{2} (107.513 sq mi)
- Elevation: 861 m (2,825 ft)

Population (2022 census)
  - Total: 25,201
  - Density: 90.502/km^{2} (234.40/sq mi)
- Time zone: UTC−3 (BRT)
- Area code: +55 16
- Website: brodowski.sp.gov.br

Brodowski is a municipality in the state of São Paulo, Brazil. It is located in the northeast of the state, about 29 kilometres (18 miles) from Ribeirão Preto and approximately 305 kilometres (190 miles) from the state capital, São Paulo, and is part of the Metropolitan Region of Ribeirão Preto. According to the Brazilian Institute of Geography and Statistics (IBGE), the municipality had a population of 25,201 inhabitants in the 2022 census and an area of 278.458 square kilometres (107.51 square miles).

The municipality is best known as the birthplace of the painter Candido Portinari, one of the most important Brazilian artists of the twentieth century.

== History ==
The origins of Brodowski are connected to the nineteenth-century expansion of the Companhia Mogiana de Estradas de Ferro, the railway company that linked Campinas, Mogi Mirim, Casa Branca, Franca and other towns in the interior of São Paulo state.

The railway crossed the lands of Fazenda Belo Monte, between Jardinópolis and Batatais. After the inauguration of the Batatais station in 1886, local landowner Colonel Lúcio Enéas de Melo Fagundes proposed donating land for the construction of a new railway station on his property. The proposal was supported by neighboring landowners and accepted by the Companhia Mogiana.

The station was built under the direction of the Polish engineer Alexandre Brodowski, then inspector-general of the Companhia Mogiana. It was inaugurated on 5 September 1894 with a warehouse and maneuvering yard and was named in his honor. The settlement that grew around the station later became the municipality of Brodowski.

Brodowski was elevated to the category of municipality on 22 August 1913, by Law No. 1,381. At the time, Rodrigues Alves was president of the state of São Paulo and Altino Arantes was secretary of the interior.

In the twentieth century, Brodowski became closely associated with Candido Portinari, who was born on a coffee farm near the municipality in 1903. The town and its rural surroundings became recurring sources of memory and imagery in his work.Brodowski is home to the Museu Casa de Portinari, a historic house museum installed in the residence where the artist lived during his childhood and youth.

== Geography ==
Brodowski is located in the northeastern part of the state of São Paulo, about 27 kilometres from Ribeirão Preto. The municipality covers 278.458 square kilometres and sits at an average altitude of approximately 861 metres above sea level.

The municipality borders Batatais to the north, Ribeirão Preto and Serrana to the south, Altinópolis to the east and Jardinópolis to the west. Under the regional division used by IBGE, Brodowski belongs to the immediate and intermediate geographic region of Ribeirão Preto.

== Demographics ==
In the 2022 Brazilian census, Brodowski had 25,201 inhabitants. The population increased from 21,107 inhabitants in the 2010 census, reflecting the municipality's continued growth within the broader Ribeirão Preto region.

The municipality is predominantly urban, like much of the interior of São Paulo. Its demographic development has been shaped by its railway origins, its proximity to Ribeirão Preto and the economic expansion of the surrounding agricultural and service region.

== Economy and infrastructure ==
Brodowski developed historically around the railway station built by the Companhia Mogiana in the late nineteenth century. The town's early growth was tied to the circulation of people, agricultural products and goods through the railway network of northeastern São Paulo.

Today, the municipality is part of the economic and urban influence area of Ribeirão Preto. Its economy includes services, commerce, industry and agricultural activity, reflecting both its local base and its proximity to one of the main urban centers of the interior of São Paulo.

== Culture and tourism ==
Brodowski is strongly associated with Candido Portinari, who was born in the area in 1903 and repeatedly used memories of childhood, rural labor, family life and the coffee-growing interior of São Paulo in his art. The city's cultural identity is closely tied to this legacy.

The Museu Casa de Portinari is one of the municipality's principal cultural institutions. It is located in the house where Portinari lived during his childhood and youth and to which he returned throughout his life to spend periods with family and friends. The museum preserves mural paintings made by Portinari on the walls of the house and chapel, including works in fresco and tempera techniques, as well as personal objects, furniture and family material connected to the artist.

The museum was inaugurated on 14 March 1970 and is listed as cultural heritage by both the Instituto do Patrimônio Histórico e Artístico Nacional (IPHAN) and CONDEPHAAT, the São Paulo state heritage council. The museum's official mission is to preserve, research and communicate the house, mural paintings and collections as heritage objects connected to local, regional and national history.

Brodowski also promotes local memory through routes and cultural activities connected to Portinari. The museum has participated in initiatives such as Caminhos de Portinari, a project intended to connect the museum with other places of memory and visitation in the city.

== Name and spelling ==
The municipality is named after Alexandre Brodowski, the Polish engineer associated with the construction of the railway station around which the settlement developed. The spelling of the municipality's name has sometimes been discussed in relation to the Portuguese form Brodósqui, but the official municipal spelling remains Brodowski.

== Notable people ==
- Candido Portinari (1903–1962), painter, born on a coffee farm near Brodowski.
- Saulo Ramos (1929–2013), jurist, writer and former minister of justice of Brazil, born in Brodowski.

== Gallery ==
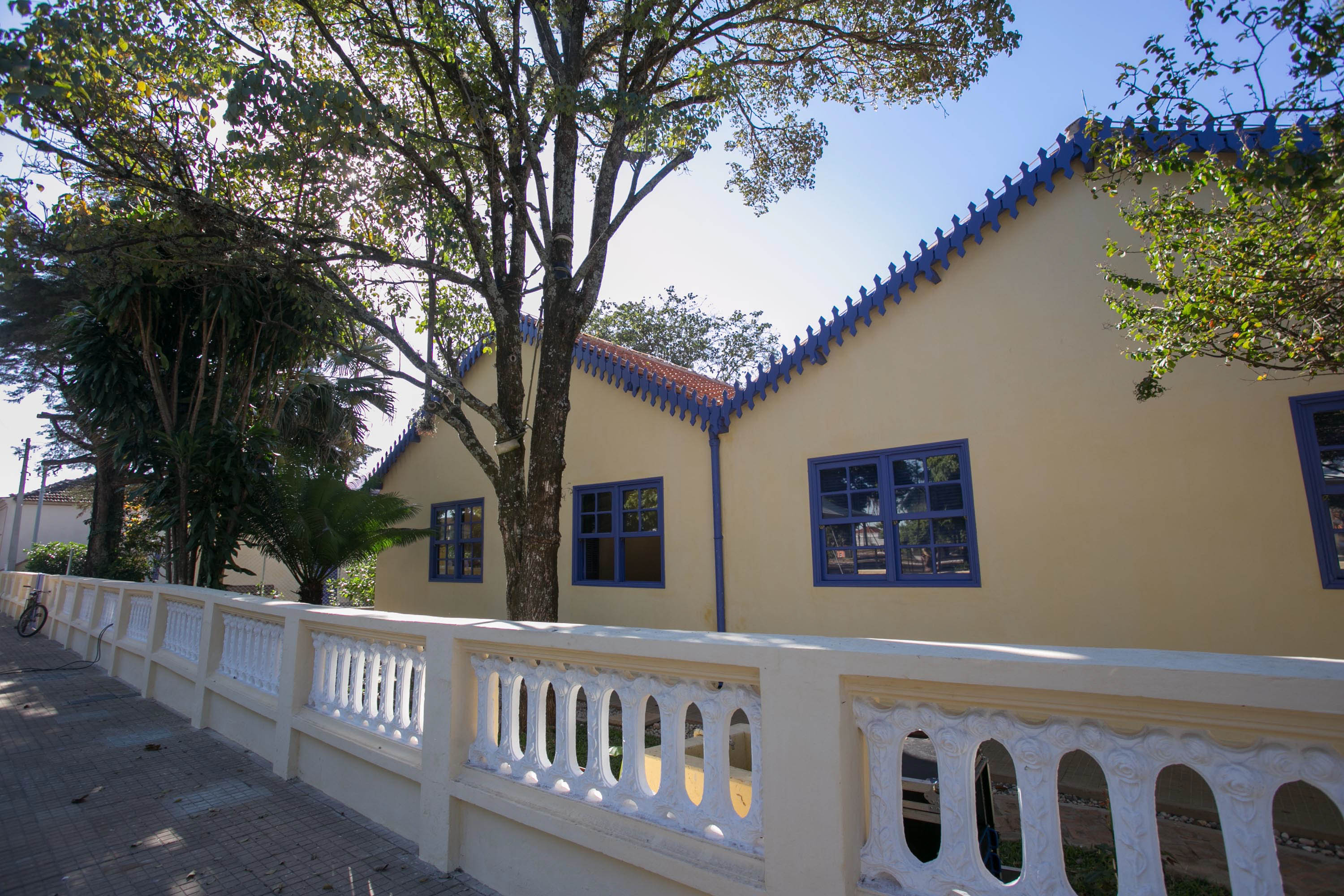
Museu Casa de Portinari

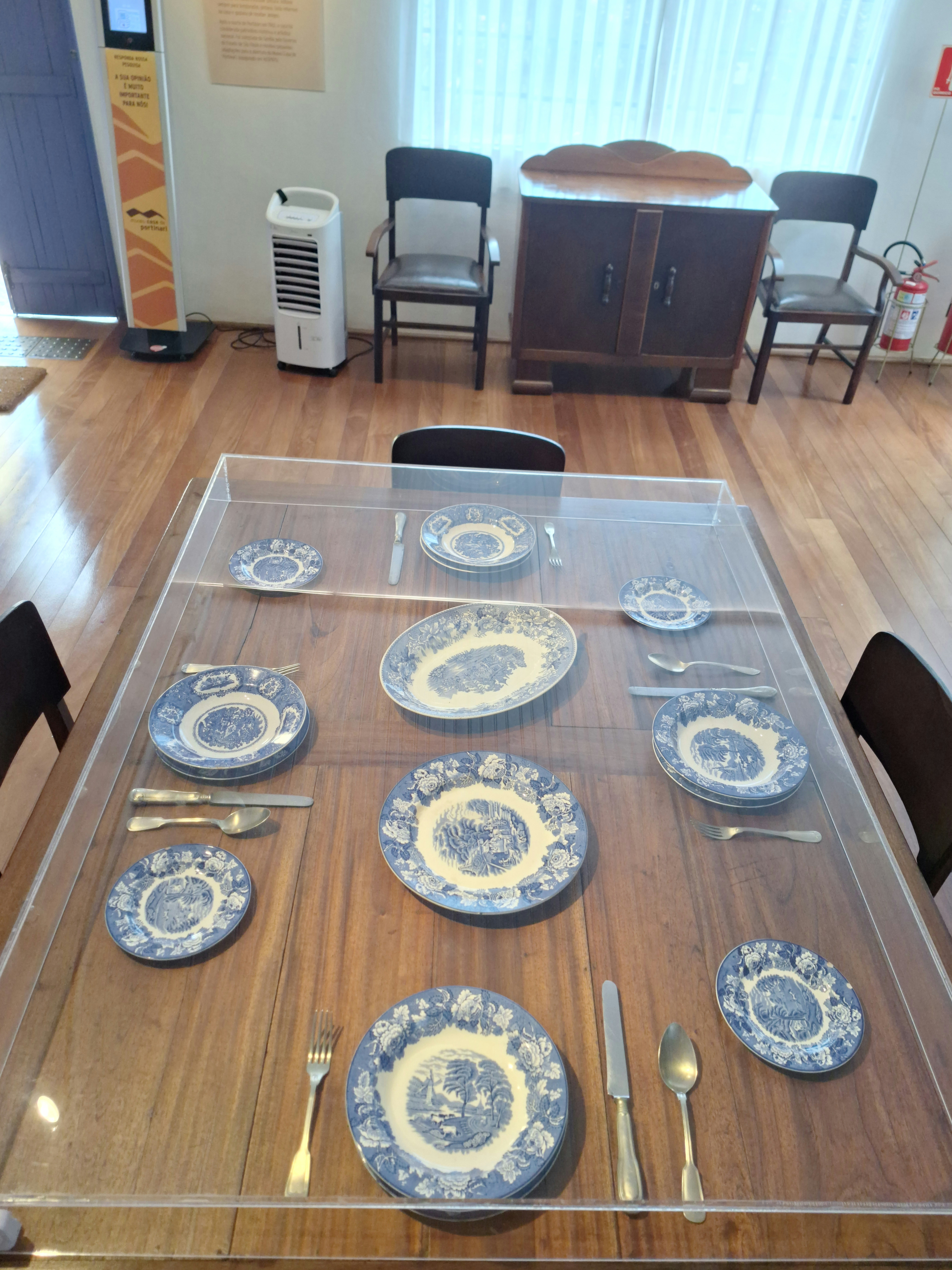
Museu Casa de Portinari in Brodowski

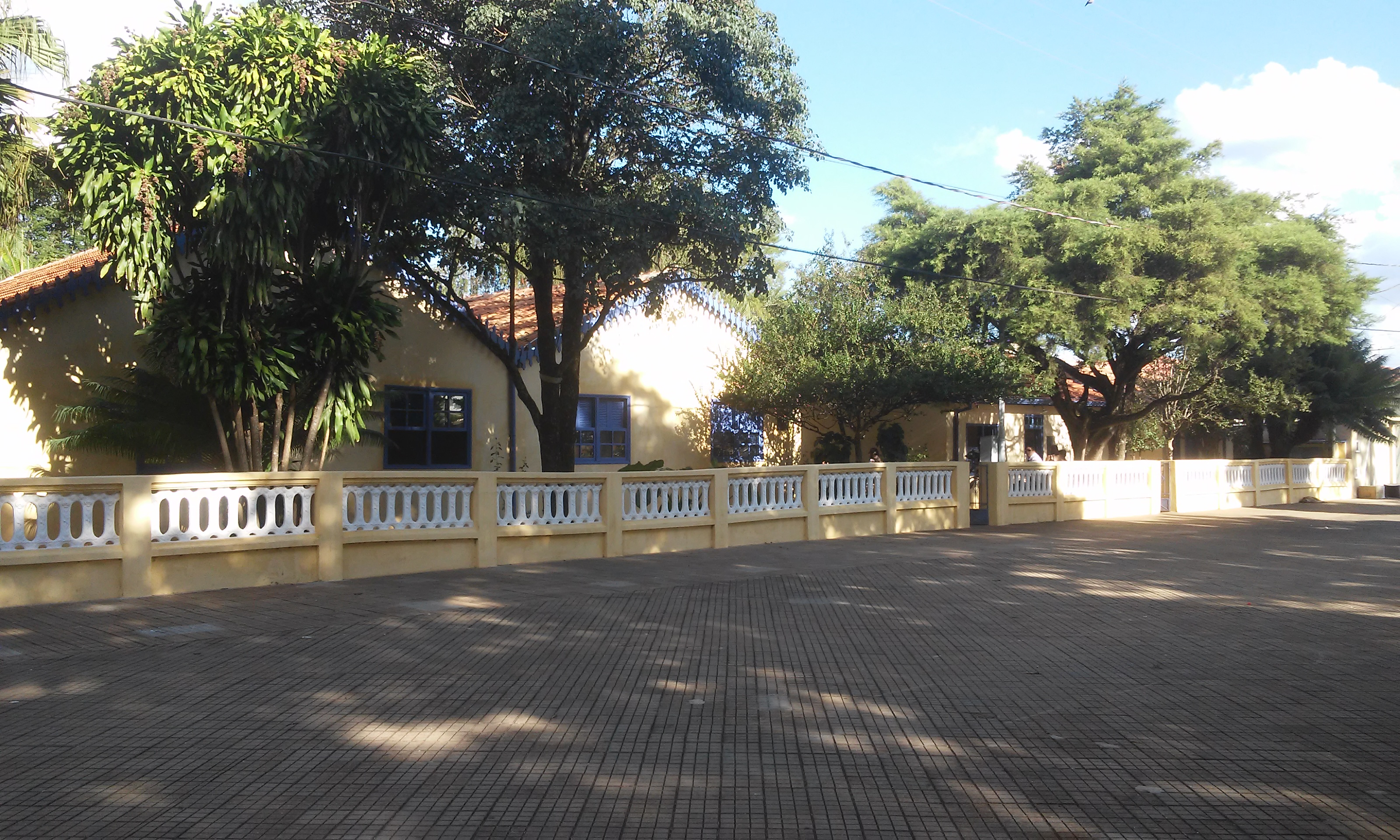
Exterior of the Museu Casa de Portinari

== See also ==
- List of municipalities in São Paulo
- Interior of São Paulo
- Museu Casa de Portinari
- Candido Portinari
- Metropolitan Region of Ribeirão Preto
