= Michael Adlerstein =

American architect

Michael Adlerstein was the Assistant Secretary-General of the United Nations and Executive Director of the United Nations Capital Master Plan, a five-year program to restore and renovate the historic United Nations Headquarters in New York, NY. He was appointed to the position by United Nations Secretary-General Ban Ki-moon in July 2007.

Adlerstein obtained his architectural degree from Rensselaer Polytechnic Institute and was a Loeb Fellow at Harvard University’s Graduate School of Design. Before joining the United Nations, he was the Vice-President and Chief Architect at the New York Botanical Garden. He previously served in positions throughout the National Park Service, and was in charge of the planning, design and construction program for the agency's Northeast region, consisting of states from Maine to Virginia. His work included partnership projects at Gettysburg, Valley Forge, Acadia and Jamestown.

In the 1980', he served as Project Director for the restoration of Ellis Island and the Statue of Liberty, the United States Department of the Interior's most ambitious historic restoration project. The success of the project led to his promotion as Chief Historical Architect. He was recognized as a national expert in the field of historic preservation.

Adlerstein served as a Peace Corps Volunteer in Colombia, and has worked as a State Department consultant on preservation issues on projects, including the preservation of the Taj Mahal. He is a Fellow of the American Institute of Architects. Since 2017, he has been teaching architecture classes as an adjunct professor at Columbia University, specializing in historic preservation.
