= United States–Gulf Cooperation Council relations =

Multilateral relations

- United States: Gulf Cooperation Council

The United States and the Gulf Cooperation Council have maintained close bilateral, economic, and military relations since the GCC was founded in 1981. This is due to the United States' close relationship with the six-member states of the GCC, Bahrain, Kuwait, Oman, Qatar, Saudi Arabia, and the United Arab Emirates. Despite the U.S. not having formal membership in or representation to the GCC, the United States has chaired formal meetings with the GCC and both sides have been brought closer due to mutual hostility with Iran since the Iranian Revolution in 1979 and the Soviet Union over fears of spread of Communism during the Cold War. Both sides worked together in conflicts such as the Soviet–Afghan War, Iran–Iraq War, and the Gulf War.

Following the September 11 attacks, the GCC and the United States alliance grew closer as they began to cooperate further against terrorism and conduct regular direct meetings and summits. With the rise of the Arab Spring and civil wars in Arab nations, friction between member states of the GCC grew, putting the United States in the middle to resolve the issues through diplomacy seen during the Qatar diplomatic crisis from 2017 to 2021. Following the end of the crisis, relations have only grown stronger and closer in mutual opposition against Iran.

== History ==
=== Background ===
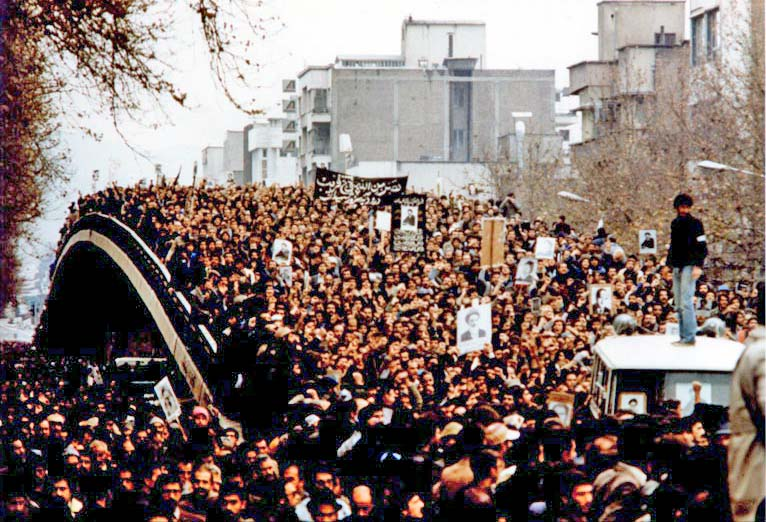
Mass demonstrations of people protesting against the Shah and the Pahlavi government on 11 December 1978 at College Bridge, Tehran.

After the end of colonialism in the Middle East, particularly the French and British Empires granting independence to its former Arab colonies, the United States filled the void by exerting its influence in the region since World War II. Although the interests of the U.S., such as expanding human rights and democracy across the world, didn't align with the member states of the GCC, they have shared the same geopolitical interests since the Cold War which was to prevent the expansion of Communism by the Soviet Union and the newly installed anti-American regime in Iran following the Iranian Revolution. Ruhollah Khomeini, the leader of the revolution and the first Supreme Leader of Iran, called for the overthrow of the American-backed monarchies in the Gulf amplifying the fears of the Arab regimes in the Gulf that they would meet a similar fate as Mohammad Reza Pahlavi. This added a sectarian element as they perceived the rise of a theocratic Iran after the 1979 revolution with a Shia leader would inspire Shia's in the predominantly Sunni Gulf Arab states would seek the removal of the Sunni leaders. Another culminating factor was the Soviet invasion of Afghanistan. Since 1979, the U.S. and GCC have been involved in indirect proxy conflicts known as the Iran–Saudi Arabia proxy war and the Iran–Israel proxy conflict, despite most of the GCC member states do not recognize or have formal relations with Israel due to their long standing position for the creation of an independent Palestine.

In 1981, the Gulf Cooperation Council was founded to counter these events to unite Arab nations as according to the founding charter of the Council, "Having the conviction that coordination, cooperation, and integration between them serve the sublime objectives of the Arab nation. And since then the United States and the GCC have formed a united front against Iran which continues to this very day. Since the establishment of the GCC, the United States has worked closely with the GCC members in using diplomacy to help deescalate conflicts in the region.

=== Soviet–Afghan War ===
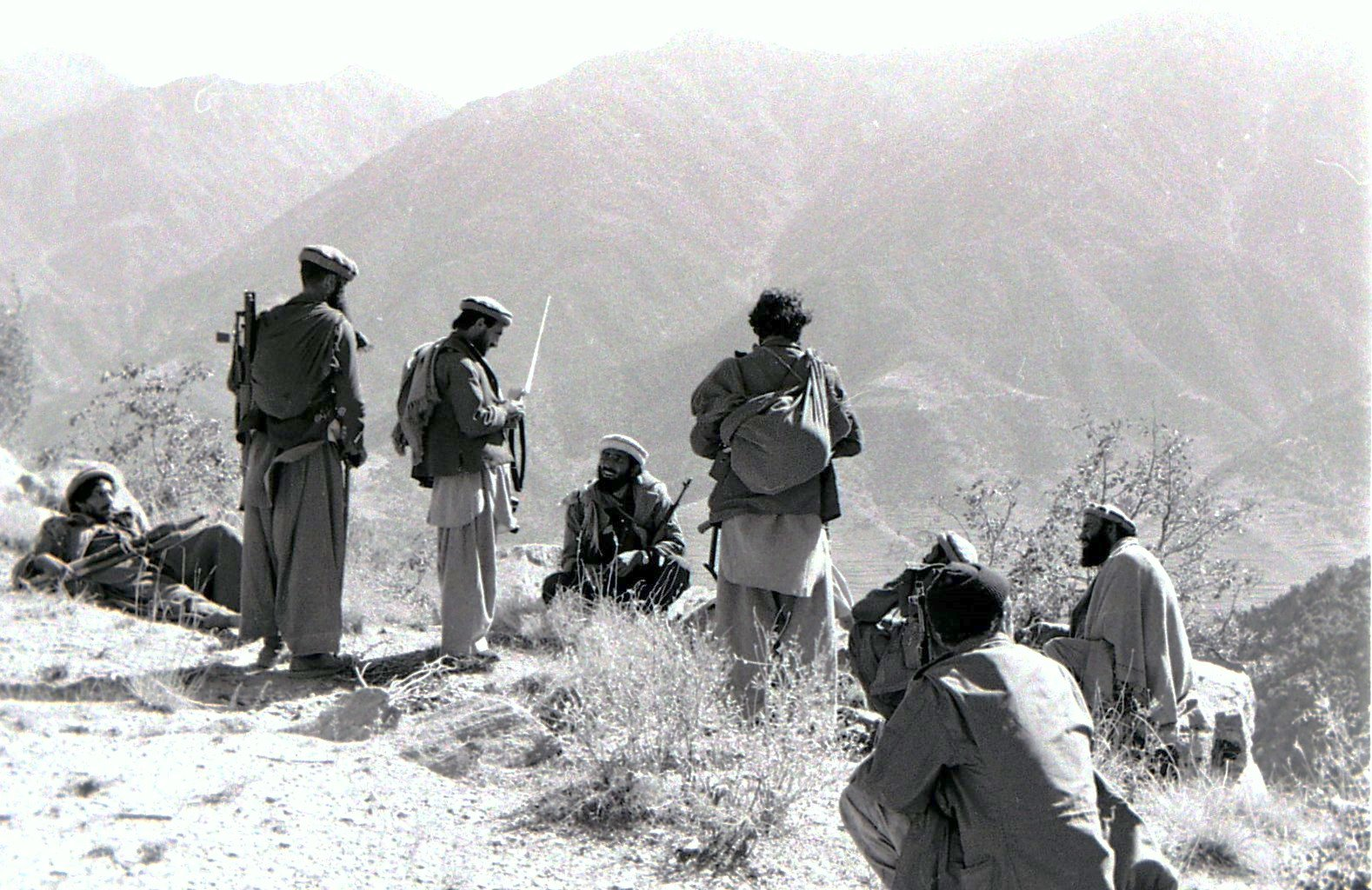
Mujahideen fighters in Afghanistan were largely backed by Saudi Arabia and the United States.

In 1979, the Soviet Union invaded Afghanistan, two years before the establishment of the GCC. Before the formation of the bloc, the United States was a major arm supplier through Saudi Arabia and into neighboring Pakistan to supply the Afghan mujahideen. With the backdrop of the Iranian Revolution, it led to the notion that the Gulf states needed to be able to protect themselves and to be more adept in international affairs taking place and that diplomacy and negotiation was needed in a modern world. Given Afghanistan's proximity to the Gulf, a fear developed of political and military strikes on the Gulf states, and from a political standpoint, a threat because it intensified fears of the possible spread of communism to the region. One year later, Soviet leader Leonid Brezhnev proposed a ban on foreign troops in the Gulf. In response, Saudi Minister of Information, Muhammad Abduh Yamani stated "the Gulf area is in no need of custodianship and that its people are capable of defending it." Omani Undersecretary of Foreign Affairs, Yusuf bin Alawi bin Abdullah stated, "these proposals will provide the Soviet Union with the opportunity to interfere in the area’s domestic affairs." Saudi Minister of Foreign Affairs Saud bin Faisal Al Saud when discussing the issue of Afghanistan "confirmed the need for Gulf states to depend on themselves for the protection of their independence and resources."

=== Iran–Iraq War ===
As President Reagan's Special Envoy to the Middle East, Donald Rumsfeld met with Saddam Hussein during a visit to Baghdad on December 20, 1983, during the Iran–Iraq War.

The GCC and the U.S. cooperated in support of Saddam Hussein of Iraq against Iran during the Iran–Iraq War. The GCC member states heavily relied on the United States for arms support while maintaining relations with Iran, but opted to support Iraq.

Support for Iraq came in various ways. The United States provided Iraq several billion dollars worth of economic aid, the sale of dual-use technology, non-U.S. origin weaponry, military intelligence, and special operations training. However, no direct arms support was given. Saudi Arabia, Bahrain, Kuwait, Qatar, and the United Arab Emirates provided mainly financial support to Iraq. Oman, on the other hand, remained neutral as it maintained relations with both Iran and Iraq calling for diplomacy and supported UN Security Council resolutions to end the conflict. Although in 1980, one year prior to the establishment of the GCC, Oman considered allowing Iraq to use military bases in the country to attack Iran, but backed away after the U.S. objected.

During the presidency of Ronald Reagan, the U.S. continued aid for Iraq against Iran through the GCC member states such as Saudi Arabia. In 1987, the U.S. sold five Boeing E-3 Sentry planes to the Saudis included provisions for "overbuilding" Saudi air bases to accommodate increasing US military intervention. In Oman and Bahrain, both countries accelerated military construction as the U.S. encouraged Saudi Arabia to push for an integrated air defense network for the Gulf Cooperation Council. Following the U.S. sinking of the Iranian naval vessel Iran Ajr on September 21, 1987, for laying naval mines in the Persian Gulf to target U.S.-flagged oil tankers, the U.S. pursued efforts with the GCC to protect U.S.-flagged ships in the Gulf.

=== Gulf War ===
After the end of the Iran–Iraq War, Kuwait and Saudi Arabia owned much of Iraq's debt. Saudi Arabia loaned somewhere between $20 to $26 billion while Kuwait had loaned $14 billion. Saddam Hussein begged both countries to forgive the debt, but they refused. In response to their refusal, Iraq invaded and annexed Kuwait prompting the launch of the Gulf War. Once again, the GCC relied on the United States for support to liberate Kuwait and restore order in the region. The bloc during the 1990 GCC summit issued the Doha Declaration in which the leaders recognized the ineffectiveness of the GCC defense and security arrangements and their failure either to deter the Iraqi aggression or to protect Kuwait.

The Gulf War began on January 17, 1991, until February 28, which resulted in a resounding defeat for Saddam Hussein. One hundred hours after the ground campaign started, on 28 February, President George H. W. Bush declared a ceasefire, and he also declared that Kuwait had been liberated.

=== 9/11 and War on Terror ===
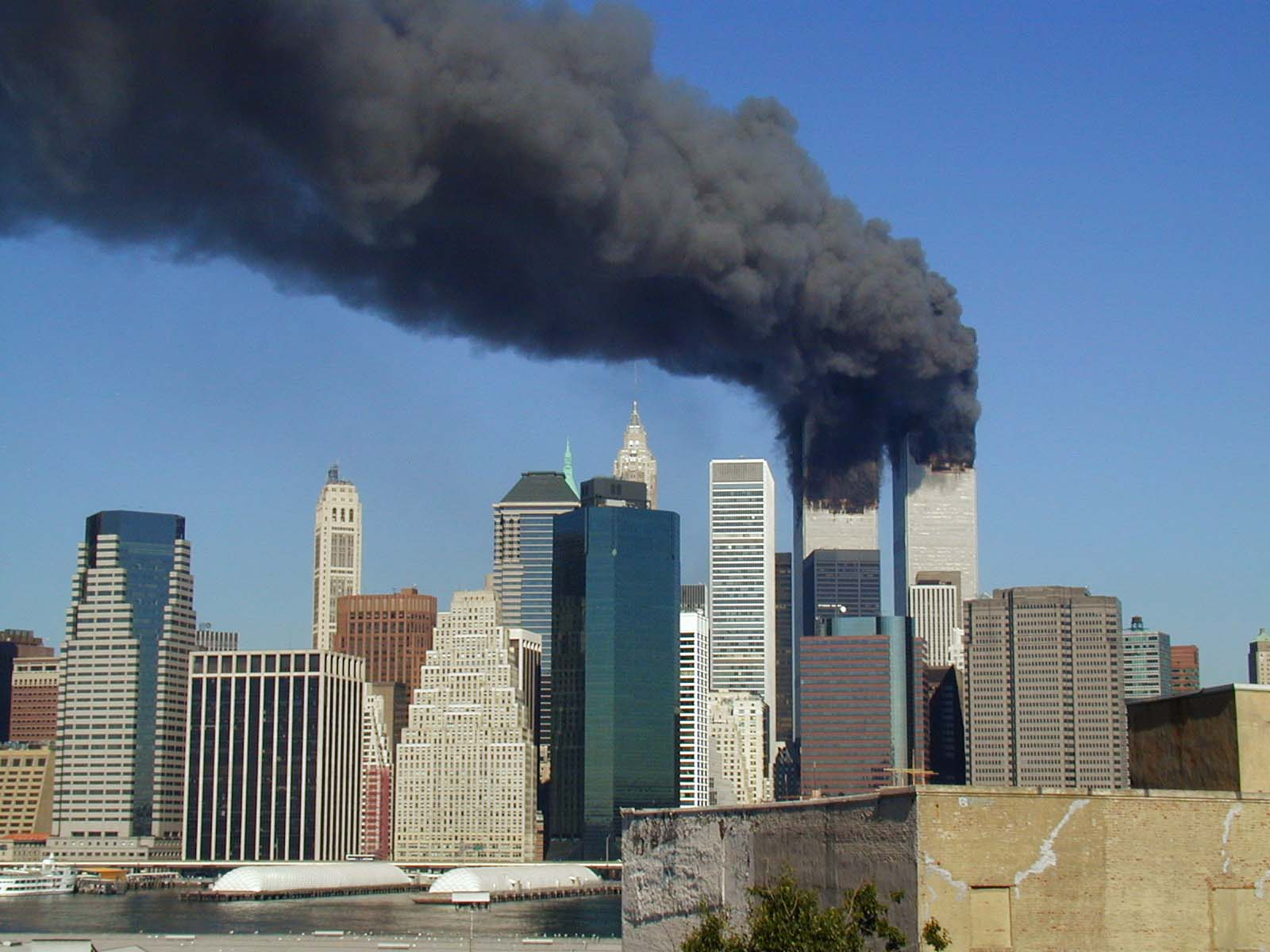
The 9/11 attacks and response by the United States and the GCC brought both sides closer to combat a common enemy and threat.

Following the September 11 attacks in 2001, the U.S. and GCC pledged to cooperate in combating terrorism and were very supportive of U.S. initiatives. However, the attacks poisoned relations between Saudi Arabia and the U.S. due to the fact that fifteen of the Al-Qaeda hijackers were Saudi Arabian and the leader of the organization was Osama bin Laden, who was born in Saudi Arabia. And long-standing accusations of Saudi involvement. Another two out of the total nineteen were from the United Arab Emirates.

On November 11, one month after the attack, Secretary of State Colin Powell held a meeting with the GCC foreign ministers during the Fifty-sixth session of the United Nations General Assembly where the ministers pledged to support the U.S in fighting Al-Qaeda. This was the first such meeting between the U.S. and the GCC. Among the key topics of discussion was the U.S. detailing a vision of a Palestinian state in accordance with the United Nations, where the GCC pressed for greater U.S. involvement in the Israeli–Palestinian conflict, requesting more than just broad statements, hoping for direct talks and a meeting between George W. Bush and Yasser Arafat.

In the aftermath of 9/11, the Bush administration pursued a global initiative to oust Saddam Hussein by military intervention claiming that Hussein had an active nuclear weapons program and ties to Al-Qaeda. None of which were proven true. During a meeting between Powell and foreign ministers of the GCC in September 2002 during the Fifty-seventh session of the United Nations General Assembly, all the GCC member states rejected any military intervention against Iraq. Despite this, in March 2003, the U.S. invaded Iraq starting the Iraq War.

On September 23, 2004, during the Fifty-ninth session of the United Nations General Assembly, Powell met with the foreign ministers of the GCC, the first in two years and the first since the Iraq War, focusing on combating terrorism, stabilizing Iraq, and advancing freedom in the Middle East.

After Condoleezza Rice became Secretary of State replacing Colin Powell in 2005, she met with the GCC foreign ministers on September 19 during the Sixtieth session of the United Nations General Assembly. The following year, she attended the GCC Summit of foreign ministers in Abu Dhabi on February 23, 2006. The first such meeting to take place outside the U.S. On September 20, during the Sixty-first session of the United Nations General Assembly, Rice met with the foreign ministers of the GCC. While speaking about regional issues, formal membership of the United States in the GCC was discussed but no agreement was reached. Issues with membership included the creation of a permanent GCC representation and whether it would be in New York City or Washington, D.C.

On January 16, 2007, Kuwait hosted a meeting of the GCC, Egypt, Jordan, and the U.S. between the foreign ministers in Kuwait City. Key subjects of discussion included supporting the development of the Palestinian economy, pledging political and financial support to Lebanon condemning the assassination of Rafic Hariri in 2004 and the assassination of Pierre Amine Gemayel two months earlier in November 2006, and preventing the spread of sectarian warfare from Iraq as the Arab nations pledged support for the troop surge. The participants also resolved to counter the pursuit of nuclear weapons technology in contravention of the Nuclear Non-Proliferation Treaty.

On July 31, a high-level ministerial meeting was held in Sharm El Sheikh, Egypt, between the foreign and defense ministers from the GCC, Egypt, Jordan, and Secretary Rice and United States Secretary of Defense Robert Gates. The summit addressed the Israeli–Palestinian conflict, combating terrorism, the growing threat and risk of Iran and its nuclear program. The U.S. officially announced plans to give military aid worth more than $43 billion to Saudi Arabia, Israel, Egypt and other Gulf states to which Iran criticized stating "America has always considered one policy in this region, and that is creating fear and concerns in the countries of the region and trying to harm the good relation between these countries, and making an effort to create a chance to sell its arms and impose the export of these arms to countries in the region." Another meeting between Rice and the foreign ministers took place on September 25 during the Sixty-second session of the United Nations General Assembly.

On April 21, 2008, the GCC summit of the foreign ministers was held in Manama, Bahrain with the U.S., Egypt, and Jordan. All parties released the Manama Declaration where they reaffirmed their commitment to the sovereignty and territorial integrity of regional states and cooperate against threats to regional peace, supported a peace agreement based on the commitments from the Annapolis Conference and international principles for a two-state solution, called for states to prevent the pursuit of nuclear weapons in violation of the Non-Proliferation Treaty while supporting transparent development of civilian nuclear energy, and referenced the 2005 Riyadh Declaration which called for the rejection of ideologies that instigate hatred, condemned terrorism, extremism, and sectarian violence while emphasizing the need for educational and cultural opportunities and strengthening values of tolerance and dialogue.

On September 26, 2009, Secretary of State Hillary Clinton met with her GCC foreign minister counterparts including the foreign ministers of Egypt, Iraq, and Jordan at the Waldorf Astoria New York during the Sixty-fourth session of the United Nations General Assembly.

=== Arab Spring, civil wars, and shifting alliances ===
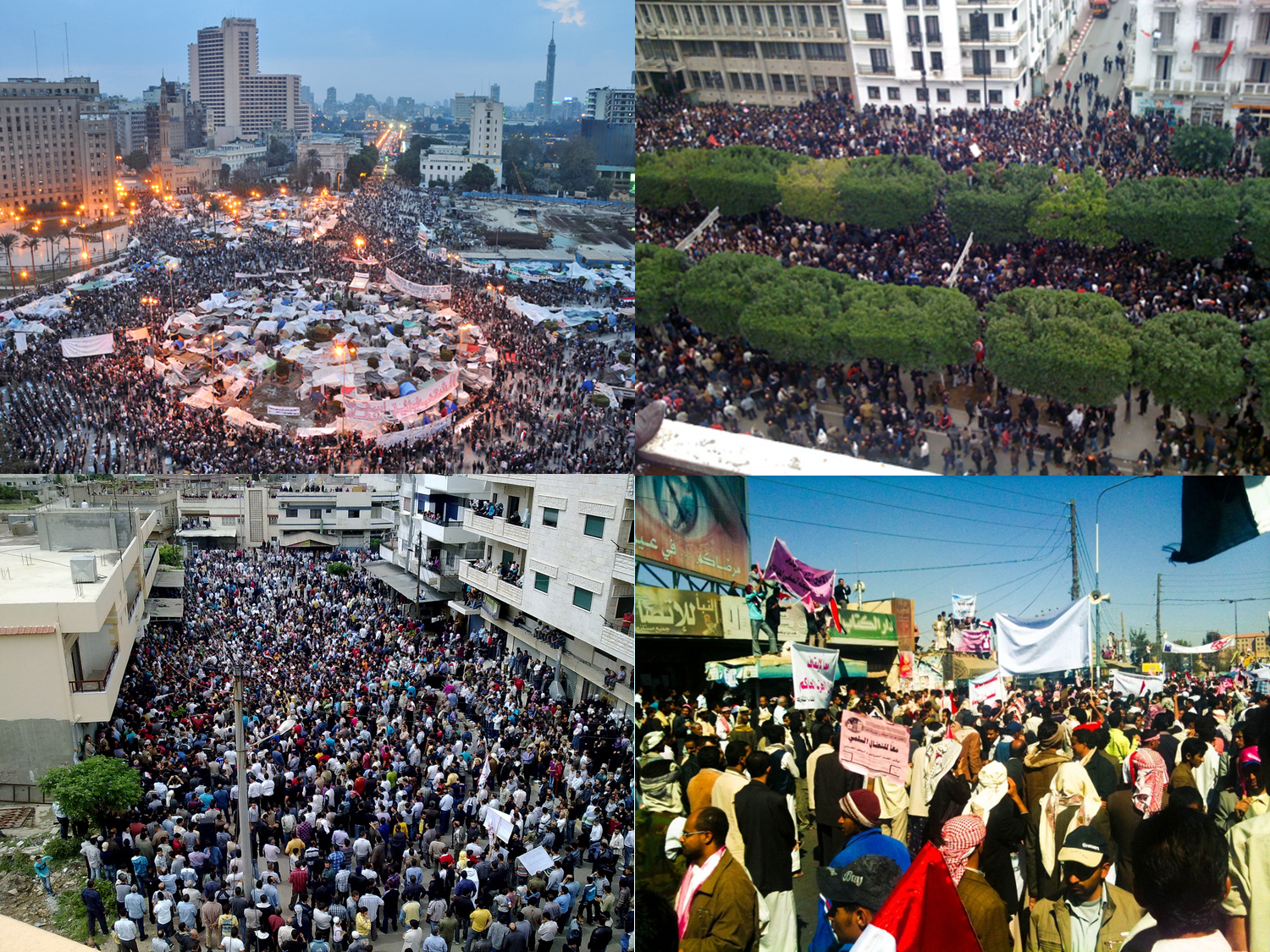
Protesters gathered at Tahrir Square in Cairo, Egypt, 9 February 2011; Habib Bourguiba Boulevard, protesters in Tunis, Tunisia, 14 January 2011; Dissidents in Sanaa, Yemen, calling for president Ali Abdullah Saleh to resign on 3 February 2011; Crowds of hundreds of thousands in Baniyas, Syria, 29 April 2011

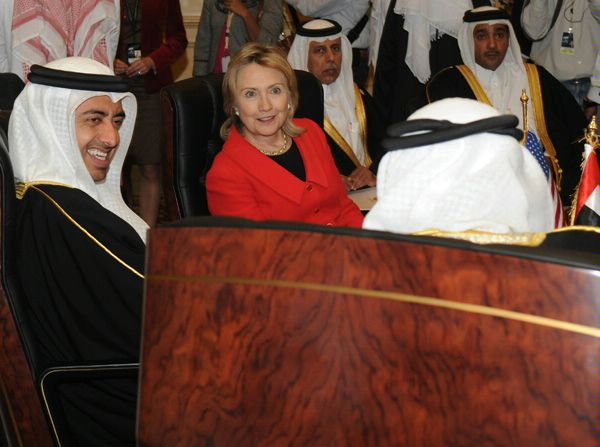
United States Secretary of State Hillary Rodham Clinton and United Arab Emirates Foreign Minister Abdullah bin Zayed Al Nahyan before the start of a Gulf Cooperation Council roundtable meeting on January 12, 2011, in the Qatari capital of Doha.

In late 2010, protests occurred in the Middle East in predominately Arab nations for all but two member states of the GCC, Qatar and the United Arab Emirates, known as the Arab Spring. The primary goal of the protests were to peacefully change the authoritarian regimes for democracy, economic freedom, employment, free elections and broader political and societal reform.

Regime changes in Tunisia led to the ouster of Zine El Abidine Ben Ali. In Egypt it led to the ouster of Hosni Mubarak. The crisis in Egypt brought the bloc into opposite sides for the first time. Saudi Arabia favored Mubarak while Qatar favored the Muslim Brotherhood in Egypt. After Mohamed Morsi of the Freedom and Justice Party, which is affiliated with the Muslim Brotherhood, was deposed by Abdel Fattah el-Sisi in the 2013 Egyptian coup d'état, Saudi Arabia designated the group as a terrorist organization in 2014. Saudi Arabia and the UAE supported the coup against Morsi.

For members of the GCC, only Saudi Arabia, Oman, and Kuwait had minor protests that resulted in some reform and political change only in Oman and Kuwait. Major protests occurred in 2011 in Bahrain that resulted in Saudi-led military intervention through the Peninsula Shield Force resulting in suppressing the protests. The GCC fully supported the intervention. Oman was the only member state not to send any of its forces, but did officially support the intervention. However, it strained ties between Saudi Arabia and the United States. A representative described the government as "shocked" by the move but opposed the Iranian characterization of the intervention as an invasion. Despite this, on June 7 Barack Obama met with Bahraini Crown Prince Salman bin Hamad Al Khalifa at the White House. The meeting wasn't on Obama's daily schedule. An administration official told the Wall Street Journal that Obama would "drop by" a meeting between Salman and National Security Adviser Tom Donilon. The meeting was described as productive.

On January 12–13, 2011, Clinton visited Doha, Qatar, meeting with the foreign ministers of the GCC and on the 12th and on the 13th addressing the Forum for the Future conference. During the sidelines of the conference she encouraged Arab leaders to reform their countries in wake of the protests. Later in the year on September 23, Clinton met with the foreign ministers of the GCC along with Secretary of Defense Leon Panetta during the Sixty-sixth session of the United Nations General Assembly.

==== Qatar–Saudi Arabia diplomatic conflict ====
In 1995, when Hamad bin Khalifa Al Thani took power deposing his father in the 1995 Qatari coup d'état, Qatar fundamentally began to shift its foreign policy not only in the region, but also around the world. Al-Thani believed Qatar could find security only by transforming itself from a Saudi appendage to a rival of Saudi Arabia. Qatar was considered a vassal state of Saudi Arabia. Since Qatar has the world's largest natural gas field, South Pars/North Dome Gas-Condensate field, and since Qatar like Saudi Arabia is a U.S. ally, it hosts the largest American base in the Middle East, Al Udeid Air Base since 2002 with a formal pact, it had enough leverage to counter Saudi Arabia and not be dependent on them.

Al Jazeera, the state-owned news agency of Qatar, became another flash point of tensions between the two countries. Saudi Arabia accused Al Jazeera of negative coverage of Saudi Arabia to which both the network and Qatar denied. The coverage in the Saudi view prompted Saudi Arabia enough that it withdrew its ambassador in 2002 until 2008 in hopes it would change course, but it did not work.

Terrorism

But the biggest concern was Qatar's foreign policy toward Iran, Israel, and support for Islamist groups in the region to which the rest of the bloc viewed as a threat. Qatar has long been accused of supporting terrorism in the region. Qatar has been accused of financing groups and allowing their country to finance groups such as Al-Qaeda. Khalid Sheikh Mohammed, the mastermind behind 9/11, was in Qatar in 1996 when the FBI was tracked in Doha and almost arrested him. However, Mohammed was tipped off and fled the country. It has been alleged that Khalifa bin Hamad Al Thani's cousin, Abdullah bin Khalid Al Thani, the then-Interior Minister, tipped off Mohammed and Qatar-provided passport on a "government executive jet". Abdullah was briefly detained under house arrest for this. Abdullah's ties to KSM date back to this time as Minister of Islamic Affairs from 1992 to 1995 and alleged to have provided funding to KSM to support him in combat in the Bosnian War. Qatar has also been a long supporter of Palestinian terrorist organizations like Hamas and even hosts the groups leaders in Doha. Saudi Arabia itself has also been accused of supporting terrorism and even Al-Qaeda. Saudi Arabia even used to finance Hamas from the early 2000s until U.S. pressure under the Bush administration after 9/11 made Saudi Arabia officially end support in 2002 and began cracking down on all funding in the country in 2004, and funds dried up from the country by 2006. Since then, Saudi Arabia has viewed Hamas as a threat and it provided Iran to be much closer to Hamas and in itself made Iran, Hamas' biggest state sponsor.

Iran

Qatar is one of the few Arab states that maintains positive relations with Iran. Iran and Qatar share ownership of the South Pars/North Dome Gas-Condensate field. United Arab Emirates politicians claim that "Qatar invests billions of dollars in the U.S. and Europe and then recycles the profits to support Hamas, the Muslim Brotherhood and groups linked to Al-Qaeda. While Qatar hosts the American military base from which the U.S. directs its regional war against extremism, it also owns media networks responsible for inciting many of the same extremists". In 2006, Qatar was the only United Nations Security Council member to vote against United Nations Security Council Resolution 1696 that called on Iran to halt its nuclear enrichment program.

In April 2017, after a 12-year freeze, Qatar lifted a self-imposed ban on developing the gas field with Iran, that would require cooperation between the two countries. According to David Roberts, a Qatar foreign policy expert at King's College London, if a conflict erupts between America and Iran, Qatar would literally be caught in the middle. "If you are Qatar, you look across the water and you think, when Iran did have the opportunity to take a few Arab islands, they did it. Qatar needs to have the ability to peacefully go about their business of sucking all the gas out of that giant field. Iran could make that process very difficult." A senior fellow of Middle Eastern studies at the Council on Foreign Relations concludes that "There's a recognition of the general tendencies of the Gulf states to hedge their bets. There's always a question in the back of the minds of the leadership--how much faith can they put in the U.S.?"

On May 27, 2017, the newly reelected Iranian President Hassan Rouhani held a phone call with Qatar's Emir Tamim bin Hamad Al Thani. Rouhani told Qatar's emir, "The countries of the region need more cooperation and consultations to resolve the crisis in the region and we are ready to cooperate in this field."

Iran and Qatar do not see eye-to-eye on all issues such as the Syrian civil war, where Qatar supported removing Bashar al-Assad, and its closeness to the United States and military support for the U.S. providing bases to them which Iran views as a threat.

Tensions between Qatar and the GCC member states over Iran and terrorism culminated in the Qatar diplomatic crisis from 2017 to 2021.

Israel

With Israel, despite no official relations between Israel with both Saudi Arabia and Qatar, Hamad bin Khalifa Al Thani became the first leader of Qatar and of the Gulf states to meet with Israeli Prime Minister Shimon Peres after Israel opened a trade office in Doha, which until 2009, served as a de facto embassy for Israel. The visit by Peres to Qatar took place on April 2, 1996, and was the first de facto recognition from a GCC member state. Israel also signed an agreement to purchase Qatari natural gas which was signed five months earlier in November 1995. The deal to buy gas was part of a three-year negotiation. All of this was part of the peace process made after the Oslo Accords. Peres as Deputy of the Prime Minister of Israel visited Qatar and met Al-Thani again on January 29–30, 2007. On September 25 in New York City during the Sixty-second session of the United Nations General Assembly Thani met with Israeli Foreign Minister Tzipi Livni.

==== Libya ====
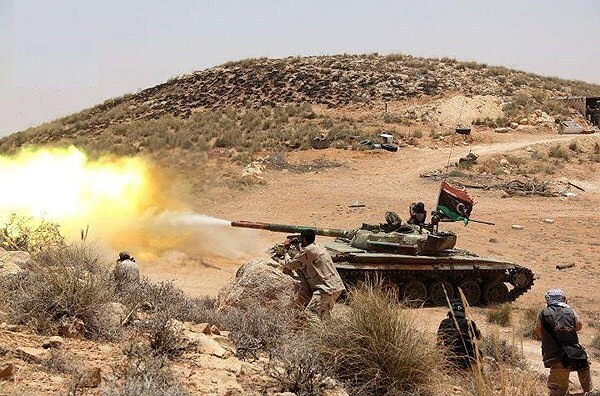
The rebellion against Muammar Gaddafi was the only conflict during the Arab Spring which presented a united front of the GCC.

Major conflicts that arose as a result of a crackdown of Arab Spring protests outside the GCC were the Syrian civil war whose main goal was the ouster of Bashar al-Assad (would not occur until December 2024), the First Libyan civil war which saw the ouster of Muammar Gaddafi, a civil war in Yemen in 2014, two years after the resignation of Ali Abdullah Saleh, and a second civil war in Libya from 2014 to 2020. The wars in Syria, Yemen, and the second Libyan civil war put members of the GCC on opposite sides causing internal conflicts within the bloc. The first war in Libya against Gaddafi's regime presented unity of the bloc. All members of the GCC in a joint statement representing the bloc stated that Gaddafi's regime lost legitimacy and requested the Arab League, which all members of the GCC are also members of, to take measures to stop the bloodshed in Libya and to initiate contacts with the National Transitional Council formed by the opposition including calling on the United Nations Security Council to impose a no-fly zone over Libya to protect civilians. Gaddafi had among several people and organizations he blamed for the uprising was Al Jazeera which is owned by the Qatari government. Qatar rejected the claim, but did in fact cover Gaddafi negatively. The then-Emir of Qatar Hamad bin Khalifa Al Thani ordered Al Jazeera to emphasize the Libyan conflict, contributing to the insurgency's spread and influencing the Arab world's view of Libya. Within a week of the start of the rebellion, Al Jazeera began using the rebels' tricolor flag to identify its coverage. Libya in March of 2011 had arrested four Al Jazeera journalists in Tripoli. Bahrain, Kuwait, Qatar, and the United Arab Emirates were individual members of the Libya Contact Group as was the GCC and the U.S. Saudi Arabia was one of the new countries to take part in Paris for the last meeting of the LCG, but did not attend, nor did it for the London Conference on Libya on March 29, 2011 that led to the LCG. Qatar even sent troops to Libya for training, communications and strategy to the Libyan opposition. The U.S. through NATO supported the ouster of Gaddafi during the 2011 military intervention in Libya in alliance with the GCC with Qatar, along with troops, and United Arab Emirates as part of the no-fly zone.

==== Syria ====
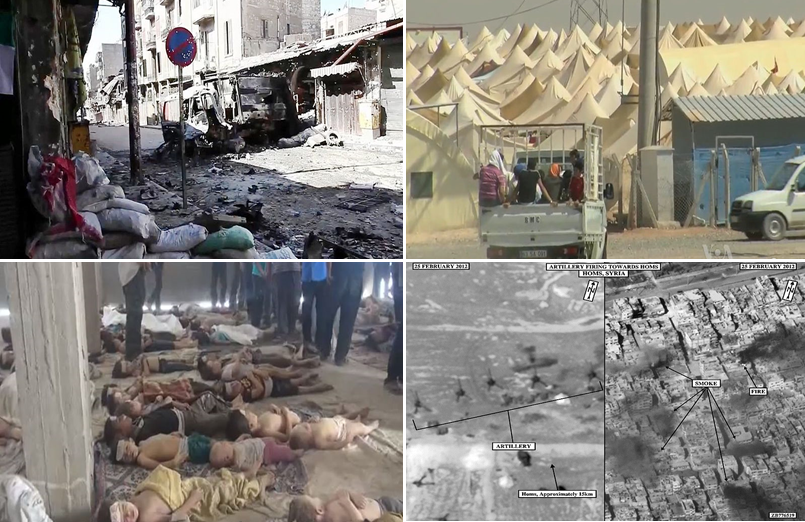
The war in Syria represented a major crisis for the GCC and the United States due to the Assad regime's close ties with Iran and rise of Islamist groups presented a major challenge until 2024 when the Assad regime collapsed.

In Syria, the GCC in October 2011, similar to Libya, the GCC criticized the crackdown and called for an Arab League meeting. Earlier in August, the GCC had called for an end to the bloodshed while calling for reform in the country.. The U.S. called on Assad to step down. Calls for Bashar al-Assad ouster by the GCC, unlike Gaddafi, was more in line with the Iran–Saudi proxy conflict. Assad continued his father's Hafez al-Assad close ties with Iran that were established after the Iranian Revolution and was one of two Arab states, the other being Libya under Gaddafi, to support Iran during its war against Saddam Hussein. The GCC states supported the Syrian opposition and viewed the National Coalition of Syrian Revolutionary and Opposition Forces as the legitimate representative of Syria, and was based in Doha. All member states except for Oman would recall their ambassadors, close their embassies, and did not join in on international sanctions, but also refused to support the Syrian opposition. Omani Foreign Minister Yusuf bin Alawi bin Abdullah stated that Oman's role in the conflict would strictly be constrained to humanitarian assistance in sharp contrast with Saudi Arabia and Qatar. But withdrew its ambassador in 2012 when the crackdown further escalated into a civil war only to fill the role in October of 2020.

While visiting Iran from August 25–26, 2012, the Emir of Qatar, Hamad bin Khalifa Al Thani described the protest movement in Syria as "a real civil uprising to demand change, justice and freedom" and suggested the international community should help Syrian authorities to abandon the crackdown and adopt major reforms. He said Arab troops should be sent into Syria "to stop the killing", the first world leader to publicly make such a suggestion.

As a continuation of the tensions between Saudi Arabia and Qatar, both nations have backed different parties in mutual opposition to Assad. Saudi Arabia claimed Qatar was backing Islamist groups whom have been accused of being linked with Al-Qaeda and other extremist elements. Groups to have been or alleged to receive Qatar backing included the Al-Nusra Front, Hay'at Tahrir al-Sham, Military Operations Command, Ahfad al-Rasul Brigades, and the Al-Tawhid Brigade.

Although Saudi Arabia has also reportedly supported similar groups like that of Qatar such as Ahrar al-Sham, Army of Conquest, Nour al-Din al-Zenki Movement, Mountain Hawks Brigade, Syrian National Army, 13th Division, Free Idlib Army, Syrian Martyrs' Brigades, Syrian Revolutionaries Front, Southern Front, Syrian Islamic Liberation Front, Jaysh al-Islam, Syrian Islamic Front, Islamic Front. Groups independently supported by Saudi Arabia included the Conquest Brigade, Authenticity and Development Front, and the Omari Brigades.

Moderate groups supported by Qatar were the Hazzm Movement and the Muntasir Billah Brigade. One moderate group that was supported by Saudi Arabia was the Al-Sanadid Forces, before it turned away from the kingdom.

But both countries supported the mainstream Syrian opposition to Assad such as Free Syrian Army, and the Syrian Revolutionary Command Council, as well as the Kurdish opposition to Assad such as the Syrian Democratic Forces of the Democratic Autonomous Administration of North and East Syria.

Both nations were also against Islamic State which viewed all GCC member states as an enemy. All GCC member states joined the U.S.-led international coalition against ISIS and all GCC member states supported the Free Syrian Army.

Both countries are actively supporting former Hay'at Tahrir al-Sham leader and President of Syria Ahmed al-Sharaa by providing financial support to Syria to support its reconstruction and transition.

==== Yemen ====
Like Syria, the war in Yemen brought friction between member states of the GCC, Saudi Arabia and the UAE. Qatar was kicked out of the Saudi intervention in 2017 due to the diplomatic blockade.

In 2011, protests against Ali Abdullah Saleh broke out calling for his removal from power. In 2012, Saleh resigned the presidency as part of an immunity deal brokered by the GCC. Two years later, in 2014, due to an ongoing political and economic crisis, a civil war broke out between the Yemeni government and the Iran-backed Houthis. The Houthis later took control of the capital of Sanaa in September. On March 26, 2015, Saudi Arabia launched an international coalition to fight the Houthis and help the now-Yemeni government in exile based in Riyadh take back power. The United States heavily backed the Yemeni government and supported the Saudi intervention.

All GCC member states except for Oman sent troops as part of the coalition. Oman instead supported dialogue between the warring parties. In 2025, the Omani's brokered a ceasefire between the Houthis and the United States. In 2017, Qatar was kicked out of the Saudi intervention due to the diplomatic blockade.

In 2018, the UAE began to shift away from the Saudi coalition and instead began backing the Southern Transitional Council, an organization that seeks to reestablish South Yemen, a former country that existed from 1967–1990 before South Yemen unified in 1990 with North Yemen. In that same year, the UAE took over the Socotra islands. This move angered both the Saudi and exiled-Yemeni government. In 2020, the UAE gave the Socotra islands to the STC. In December 2025, the STC launched an offensive taking back most of the southern portion of the country that made up the former nation of South Yemen.

All parties are also fighting against both Al-Qaeda and ISIS in the country, although the Houthis have been accused of working with Al-Qaeda's affiliate Al-Qaeda in the Arabian Peninsula to fight the U.S., Saudi Arabia, UAE, and the STC.

The war in Yemen remains the last active conflict resulting from the Arab Spring. But it was the only one to not occur from a government crackdown on protesters, but a violent crackdown did occur by Saleh's orders.

==== Second Libyan civil war ====
In 2014, a second civil war broke out in Libya until 2020, between multiple factions of those claiming to be the legitimate rulers of the Libyan government. The crisis has been ongoing since the end of the first civil war following the collapse of the Gaddafi regime. The GCC generally supported peace efforts, however, as part of tensions with Qatar, Saudi Arabia and the United Arab Emirates supported different warring factions. Saudi Arabia and the United Arab Emirates supported the House of Representatives based in Tobruk. With the House of Representatives, the Saudis and the Emirates support the Government of National Stability and the Libyan National Army led by former Gaddafi general and ally-later-turned rival Khalifa Haftar. Qatar initially supported the National Salvation Government until it dissolved in 2016. Qatar later supported the Government of National Accord when it was formed in 2015 until it was dissolved in 2021.

The role of the U.S. has long been criticized. Barack Obama recalled that not setting up a post-Gaddafi Libya was one of the biggest regrets of his presidency. From 2015–2019, the U.S. supported the Government of National Accord, later switching to support the House of Representatives in Tobruk, the Government of National Stability, and the Libyan National Army.

The U.S. had also intervened from 2015–2019 to combat ISIS in alliance with the Government of National Accord. But all sides were in common alliance against ISIS, AL-Qaeda, and other Islamist groups in Libya.

=== Mid-to-late 2010s ===
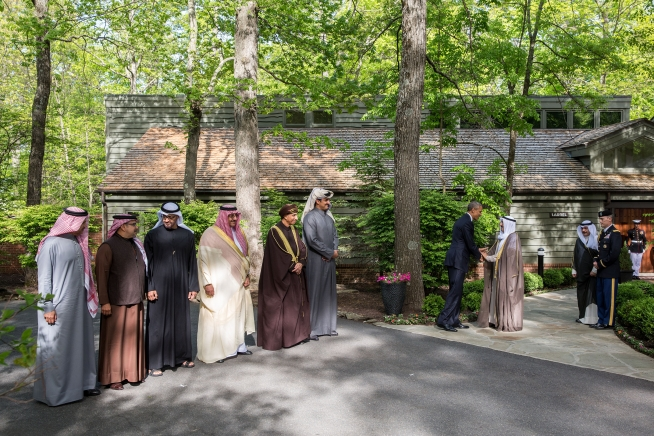
Barack Obama with Gulf Arab leaders after the Camp David summit on May 14, 2015.

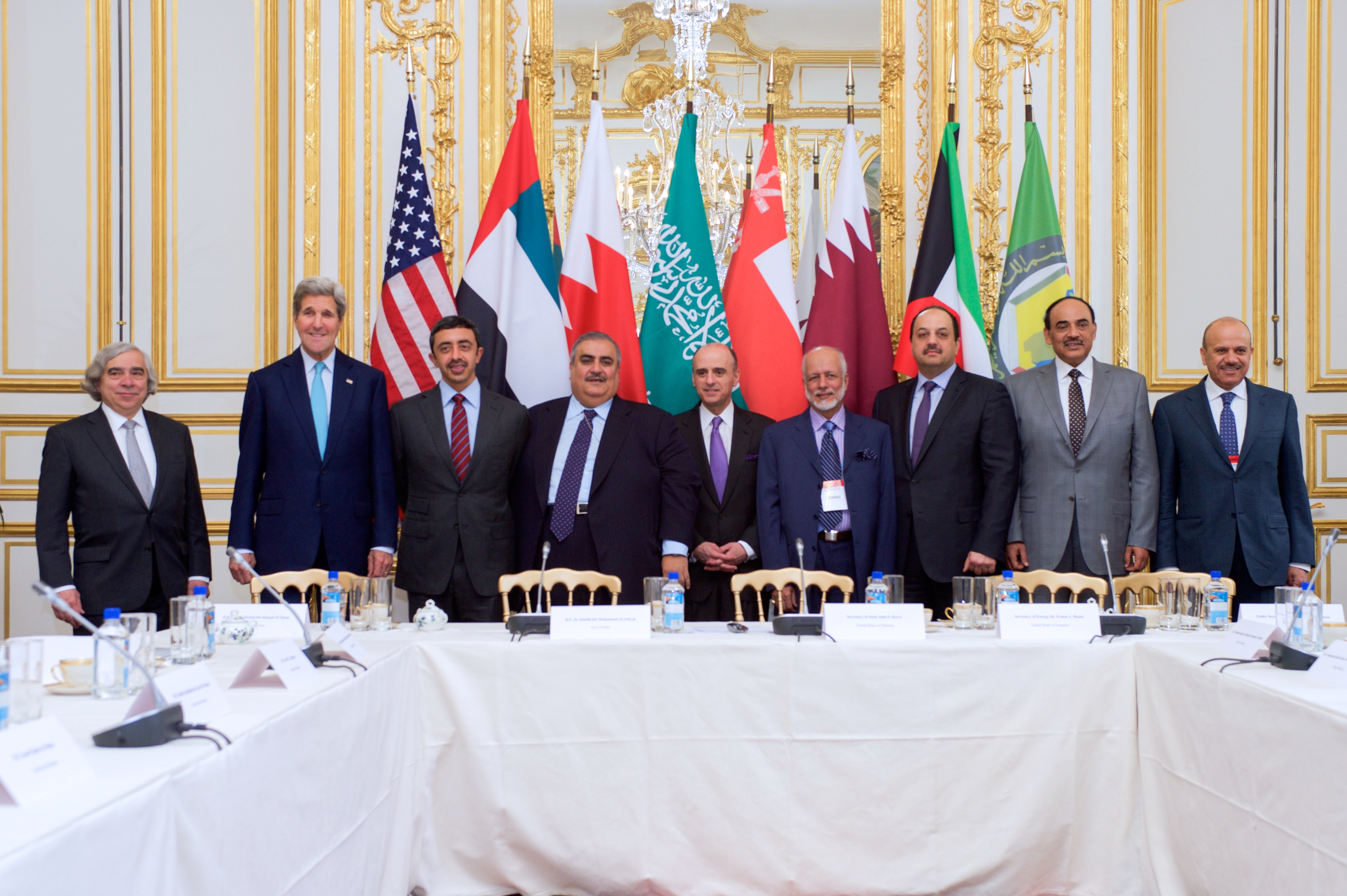
U.S. Secretary of State John Kerry and U.S. Energy Secretary Ernest Moniz with Kerry's GCC counterparts at the U.S. Ambassador's Residence in Paris, France, on May 8, 2015.

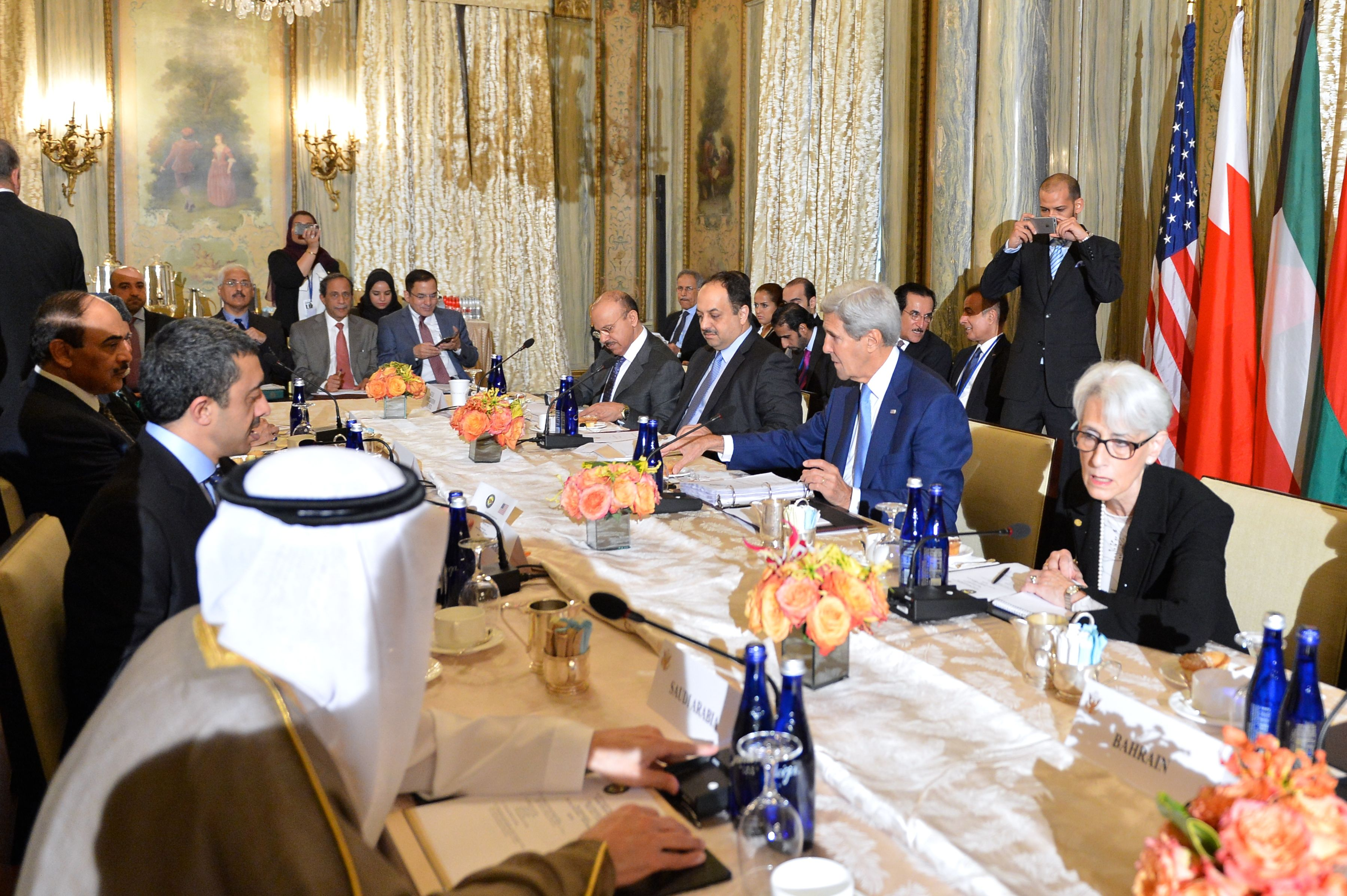
U.S. Secretary of State John Kerry and Under Secretary for Political Affairs Wendy Sherman participate in a Gulf Cooperation Council (GCC) meeting on the sidelines of the 70th Regular Session of the UN General Assembly in New York, New York, on September 30, 2015

President Barack Obama, CIA Director John Brennan and King Salman of Saudi Arabia at the GCC–U.S. Summit in Riyadh on 21 April 2016.

On March 31, 2012, the first U.S.-GCC Strategic Cooperation Forum took place in Riyadh between Clinton and the foreign ministers of the bloc at the organization's headquarters. On September 28, a second Strategic Cooperation Forum took place during the Sixty-seventh session of the United Nations General Assembly at the Waldorf Astoria. Secretary of Defense Panetta also attended the meeting with Clinton. On September 25, both sides signed the U.S.-GCC Framework Agreement for Trade, Economic, Investment and Technical Cooperation.

In 2013, John Kerry took over as Secretary of State and attended his first meeting with the GCC foreign ministers for the third Strategic Cooperation Forum on September 26 during the Sixty-eighth session of the United Nations General Assembly. Both parties formed the U.S.-GCC Security Committee to address issues related to counter-terrorism and border security. On December 16, Barack Obama signed a presidential determination allowing arms sales to the GCC as a bloc under the Foreign Assistance Act of 1961 and the Arms Export Control Act.

On September 11, 2014, Kerry visited Riyadh meeting with his GCC counterparts and counterparts from Egypt, Iraq, Jordan, and Lebanon where they issued the Jeddah Communique which was focused on defeating the Islamic State.

On September 25, during the Sixty-ninth session of the United Nations General Assembly, the fourth Strategic Cooperation Forum where the focus was on defeating the Islamic State.

On March 5, 2015, Secretary of State Kerry met with his GCC counterparts in Riyadh over discussions about negotiations about the Joint Comprehensive Plan of Action and about the civil war in Yemen.

On May 8, Kerry met with his GCC counterparts in Paris in anticipation of the first summit between the leaders of the United States and the GCC countries the following week. This marked the first time such a meeting took place outside the U.S. or the GCC countries. The bloc sought security assurances over concerns about Iran and the war in Yemen.

On May 14, President Barack Obama hosted a summit with the leaders of the GCC countries at Camp David. This marked the first time that the leaders of the GCC and president of the United States held a summit together. The day prior, the Gulf leaders were invited to the White House before visiting Camp David. Obama held direct talks with then-Crown Prince and Deputy Prime Minister, Muhammad bin Nayef, and then-Deputy Crown Prince, Mohammed bin Salman. During the summit, the Obama administration considered designating Saudi Arabia, the United Arab Emirates, Oman, and Qatar as Major non-Nato allies. A designation already granted to GCC members Bahrain and Kuwait by the George W. Bush administration in 2002 and 2004, respectively.

On August 3, another meeting of Kerry and the GCC foreign ministers took place in Doha.

On September 30, Kerry met his GCC counterparts during the seventieth session of the United Nations General Assembly for the fifth Strategic Cooperation Forum alongside Wendy Sherman, the Under Secretary of State for Political Affairs.

On January 23, 2016, Kerry met with his GCC counterparts as part of his two-day visit to Riyadh starting on the 22nd. Concerns from Gulf nations such as Saudi Arabia over the terms of the 2015 Joint Comprehensive Plan of Action regarding Iran's nuclear program and the lifting of sanctions against Iran, but also recent tensions in the region such as the temporary detention U.S. navy sailors by Iran, and release of American journalist Jason Rezaian. Saudi Foreign Minister Adel al-Jubeir did not express a positive view remaining wary of Iran, "Overall I think the United States is very aware of the danger of Iran's mischief and nefarious activities... I don't believe the United States is under any illusion as to what type of government Iran is."

On April 7, a ministerial meeting was held in Manama over concerns about Iran's missile tests on March 8 and 9, and US seizure of AK-47 rifles, rocket-propelled grenade launchers and machine guns from a dhow off the coast of Oman which were believed to be sent to the Houthis in Yemen from Iran. While the missile tests did not violate the JCPOA agreement, it did violate United Nations Security Council Resolution 2231.

On April 21, Barack Obama visited Riyadh took part in the second summit with the leaders of the GCC countries as part of his two day visit to the country starting on the 20th. Focused on regional issues, the visit came at a time of tension between the U.S. and Saudi Arabia over the Justice Against Sponsors of Terrorism Act which at the time was being considered for a vote in the U.S. Congress which it passed in the Senate the following month and in September in the House of Representatives. Obama vetoed the bill but was overridden and it became law on September 28. JASTA narrows the scope of the legal doctrine of foreign sovereign immunity. It amends the Foreign Sovereign Immunities Act and the Anti-Terrorism and Effective Death Penalty Act in regard to civil claims against a foreign state for injuries, death, or damages from an act of international terrorism on U.S. soil. The law was opposed by Saudi Arabia over longstanding allegations of Saudi involvement in the 9/11 terrorist attacks. Saudi Arabia to sell up to $750 billion in United States Treasury securities and other U.S. assets if the bill was passed. In 2017, Saudi Arabia was sued in federal court by 1,500 injured survivors and 850 family members of 9/11 victims. Plaintiffs allege that the government of Saudi Arabia had prior knowledge that some of its officials and employees were al Qaeda operatives or sympathizers. The complaint alleged that Saudi Arabia "knowingly provided material support and resources to the al Qaeda terrorist organization and facilitating the September 11th Attacks".

On September 22, Kerry for the last time met with the foreign ministers of the GCC alongside then-Foreign Secretary of the United Kingdom Boris Johnson and then-UN Special Envoy for Yemen Ismail Ould Cheikh Ahmed during the Seventy-first session of the United Nations General Assembly discussing the war in Yemen.

=== First Trump administration, Qatar diplomatic crisis, and Iran tensions ===
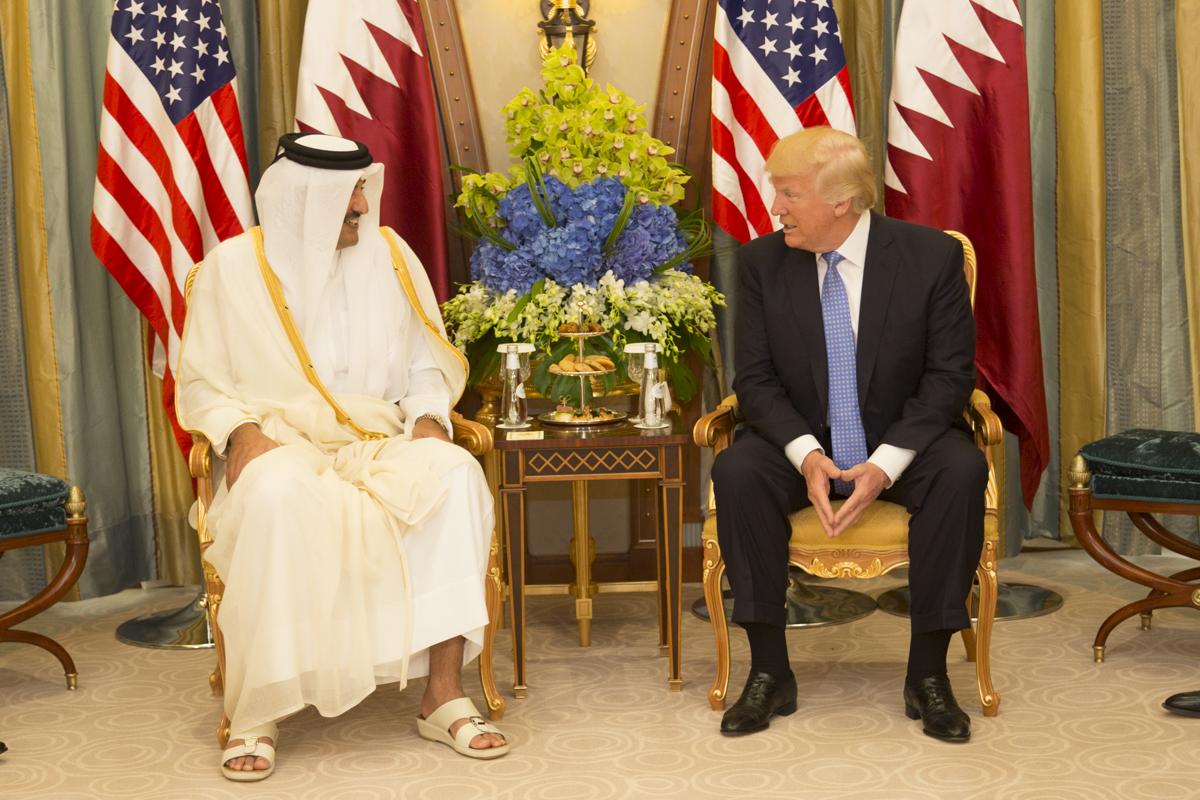
President Donald Trump meets with the Emir of Qatar, Tamim bin Hamad Al Thani, during their bilateral meeting, Sunday, May 21, 2017, at the Ritz-Carlton Hotel in Riyadh, Saudi Arabia, two weeks before the Qatar diplomatic crisis.

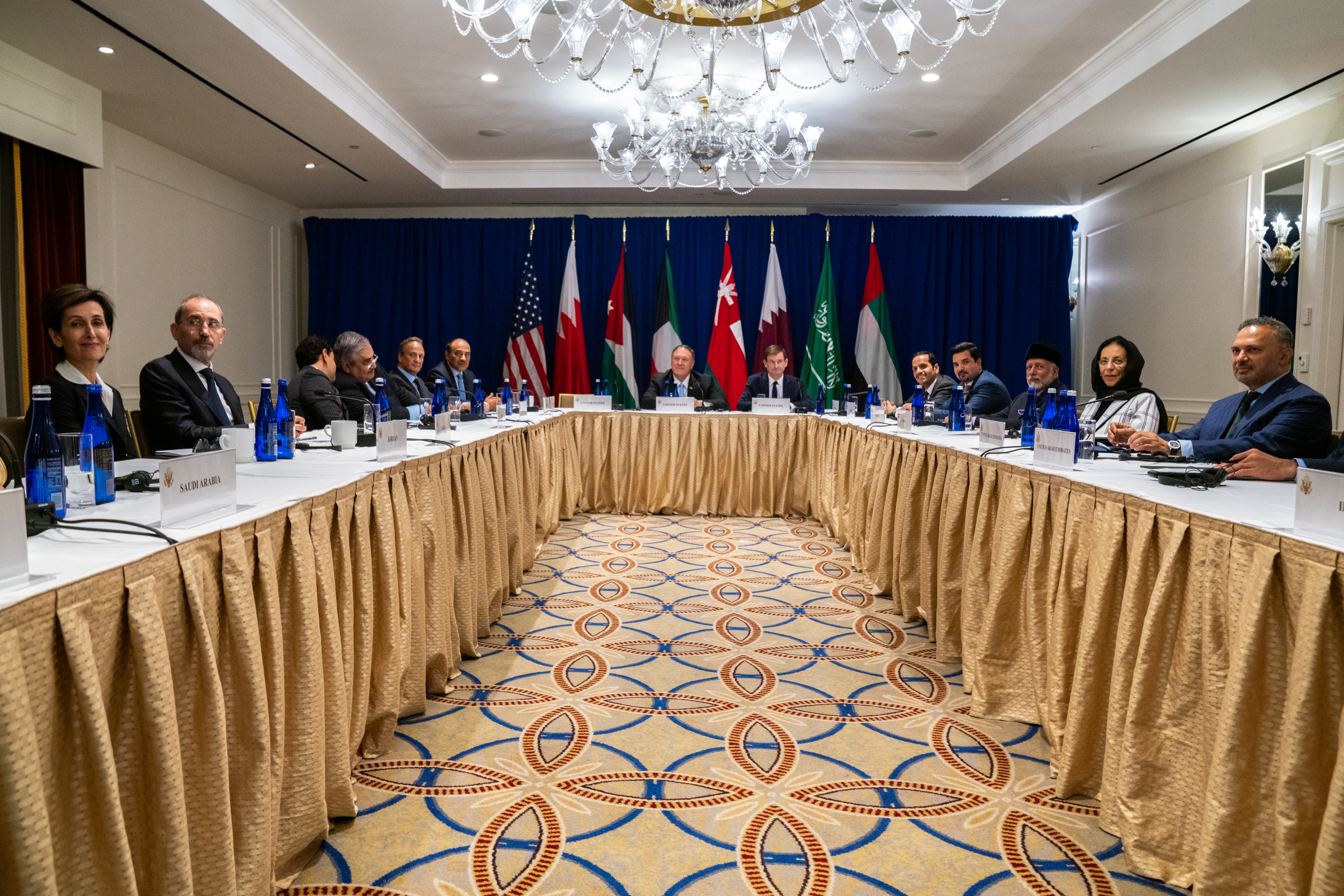
Secretary Mike Pompeo with the foreign ministers of Bahrain, Iraq, Jordan, Kuwait, Oman, Qatar, Saudi Arabia, and the United Arab Emirates at the Gulf Cooperation Council (GCC)+2 Ministerial during the UN General Assembly on September 24, 2019.

With the arrival of Donald Trump following his victory in the 2016 United States presidential election, the GCC welcomed his arrival and were reported as not missing Obama. This is due to Trump's disapproval of the JCPOA, which he criticized during the campaign, and mutual concern with the GCC over Iran still unable to be trusted. Mohamed bin Zayed Al Nahyan viewed Obama as "untrustworthy" over the changing dynamic of Middle East affairs since the Arab Spring and conflicts such as Syria and the administration's lack of involvement in that specific conflict.

On May 21, 2017, during the Riyadh summit, Trump visited Saudi Arabia meeting with his GCC leader counterparts arriving on the 20th. The day before, the U.S. made a arms deal with Saudi Arabia worth $110 billion immediately and $350 billion over 10 years. The deal was viewed as a counterweight to Iran.

Emboldened by Trump's criticism of Iran, many Arab countries decided to take action against their perceived enemies. Bahrain began cracking down on its Shia majority, killing 5 and arresting 286 people. Bahrain also shut down an independent newspaper and outlawed the country's last opposition group.

On 5 June 2017, Saudi Arabia, UAE, Yemen, Egypt, and Bahrain all announced they were cutting diplomatic ties with Qatar starting the Qatar diplomatic crisis. The underlying tension dates back to 2002, when Saudi Arabia withdrew their ambassador over Qatar's alleged ties to terrorism, shift in Qatar's foreign policy toward Iran and Israel, and what Saudi Arabia viewed as Al Jazeera's unfavorable coverage of Saudi Arabia. Hamid Aboutalebi, deputy chief of staff of Iran's President Hassan Rouhani, tweeted, "What is happening is the preliminary result of the sword dance," referring to Trump's conduct at the summit. Oman and Kuwait were the only member of the GCC not to cut off diplomatic ties and instead both nations offered diplomacy. Kuwait was the preferred nation of the U.S. to mediate between both parties. The U.S. did not impose sanctions or cut off diplomatic ties with Qatar. The U.S. even opposed a Saudi plan to invade Qatar. Nor was Qatar's membership in the GCC suspended despite calls by Bahrain's Foreign Minister Khalid bin Ahmed Al Khalifa.

Trump claimed credit for engineering the diplomatic crisis in a series of tweets. On 6 June, Trump began by tweeting: "During my recent trip to the Middle East I stated that there can no longer be funding of Radical Ideology. Leaders pointed to Qatar – look!" An hour and a half later, he remarked on Twitter that it was "good to see the Saudi Arabia visit with the King and 50 countries already paying off. They said they would take a hard line on funding extremism, and all references sic were pointing to Qatar. Perhaps this will be the beginning of the end to the horror of terrorism!" This was in contrast to attempts by the Pentagon and the Department of State to remain neutral. The Pentagon praised Qatar for hosting the Al Udeid Air Base and for its "enduring commitment to regional security." US Ambassador to Qatar Dana Shell Smith sent a similar message. Earlier, the Secretary of State Rex Tillerson had taken a neutral stance and called for dialogue. On June 8 Trump, during a phone call with the Emir of Qatar Tamim bin Hamad Al Thani, offered to act as a mediator in the conflict with a White House meeting between the parties if necessary. The offer was declined, and a Qatari official stated, "The emir has no plans to leave Qatar while the country is under a blockade." On 9 June, Trump once again put the blame on Qatar, calling the blockade "hard but necessary" while claiming that Qatar had been funding terrorism at a "very high level" and described the country as having an "extremist ideology in terms of funding." This statement was in conflict with Secretary of State Tillerson's comments on the same day, which called on Gulf states to ease the blockade. On 13 June 2017, after meeting with Tillerson in Washington, Saudi Foreign Minister Adel al-Jubeir stated that there was "no blockade" and "what we have done is we have denied them use of our airspace, and this is our sovereign right," and that the King Salman Centre for Humanitarian Aid and Relief would send food or medical aid to Qatar if needed. The following day, Trump authorized the sale of $12 billion of U.S. weapons to Qatar. According to The Intercept, Saudi Arabia and the UAE lobbied Trump to fire Rex Tillerson because he "intervened to stop a secret Saudi-led, UAE-backed plan to invade and essentially conquer Qatar."

On June 20, the State Department issued a public warning to Saudi Arabia and the UAE that the U.S. was dragged into the rift under false pretenses and were frustrated that after two weeks of the start of the embargo, Saudi Arabia and the UAE did not publicly detailed their complaints toward Qatar.

The crisis would not end until January 2021, after a Kuwaiti and U.S.-brokered agreement was reached. An agreement and final communiqué was signed on 5 January 2021, following a GCC summit at Al-Ula, Saudi Arabia, marked the resolution of the crisis. The blockade was largely a failure for Saudi Arabia, the UAE, Bahrain, and Egypt, because Qatar generated closer ties to Iran and Turkey, and became economically and militarily stronger and more autonomous.

The exact reasons for the break in diplomatic relations in 2017 are still unclear, but contemporary news coverage primarily attributed it to several events in April and May 2017, such as the 2015 Qatari hunters kidnapping and Qatar's payment of the ransom to free the hostages, including members of the ruling royal House of Thani in Iraq, and hacking incidents by Qatar against Yousef Al Otaiba, the UAE ambassador to the U.S over his ties to Israel and US-based pro-Israel conservative think tank Foundation for Defense of Democracies and the UAE against Qatar over Qatar's ties to the Muslim Brotherhood and Iran. According to the Financial Times Qatar paid $700 million to Iranian-backed Shi'a militias in Iraq, $120–140 million to Tahrir al-Sham, and $80 million to Ahrar al-Sham. It is believed the party were taken hostage by Kata'ib Hezbollah, an Iraqi Shiite militia supported by Iran. Their intention was to use the hostages as leverage on Qatar, which was a supporter of Sunni rebel groups in Syria such as Ahrar al-Sham and Jabhat Fateh al-Sham who were participating in the Siege of al-Fu'ah and Kafriya, two Shiite villages in northern Syria. But from the Riyadh Summit, Trump's public support for Saudi Arabia, according to The New York Times, emboldened the kingdom and sent a chill through other Gulf states, including Oman and Kuwait, for fear that any country that defies the Saudis or the United Arab Emirates could face ostracism as Qatar had.

On May 8, 2018, the United States withdrew from the Joint Comprehensive Plan of Action, a move supported by Saudi Arabia, UAE, and Bahrain welcomed the decision. Kuwait said it respected the move while Oman and Qatar remained neutral.

In 2018, Tillerson was replaced by Mike Pompeo as Secretary of State. In April, a GCC summit was supported to be held in Washington, D.C. but was postponed due to Pompeo at the time was not yet sworn in as Secretary of State and a solution to end the blockade against Qatar was not reached. On September 28, during the Seventy-third session of the United Nations General Assembly Pompeop met with his GCC counterparts along with the foreign ministers of Egypt and Jordan at the Lotte New York Palace Hotel for the GCC+2 Ministerial. The first such meeting in two years.

In September 2019 the U.S. along with seven founding members including Bahrain, Saudi Arabia, and the UAE founded the International Maritime Security Construct whose official stated aim is the maintenance of order and security in the Persian Gulf, Strait of Hormuz, Gulf of Oman, Gulf of Aden, Bab-el-Mandeb, and Southern Red Sea, particularly regarding maritime security of global oil supply routes after Iranian naval forces seized and attacked international tankers in the Strait of Hormuz. On September 24, Pompeo would meet with his GCC counterparts along with the foreign ministers of Iraq and Jordan for the last time as Secretary of State for GCC+2 Ministerial during the Seventy-fourth session of the United Nations General Assembly.

On July 16, in a session organized by the United States, the GCC and Iraq reached an agreement to connect Iraq to the Gulf Cooperation Council Interconnection Authority (GCCIA) project to connect the electricity grids of Iraq and the GCC member states. This is part of pledges made in 2018 by the international community at the Kuwait International Conference for the Reconstruction of Iraq following the War in Iraq (2013–2017).

=== Biden administration ===
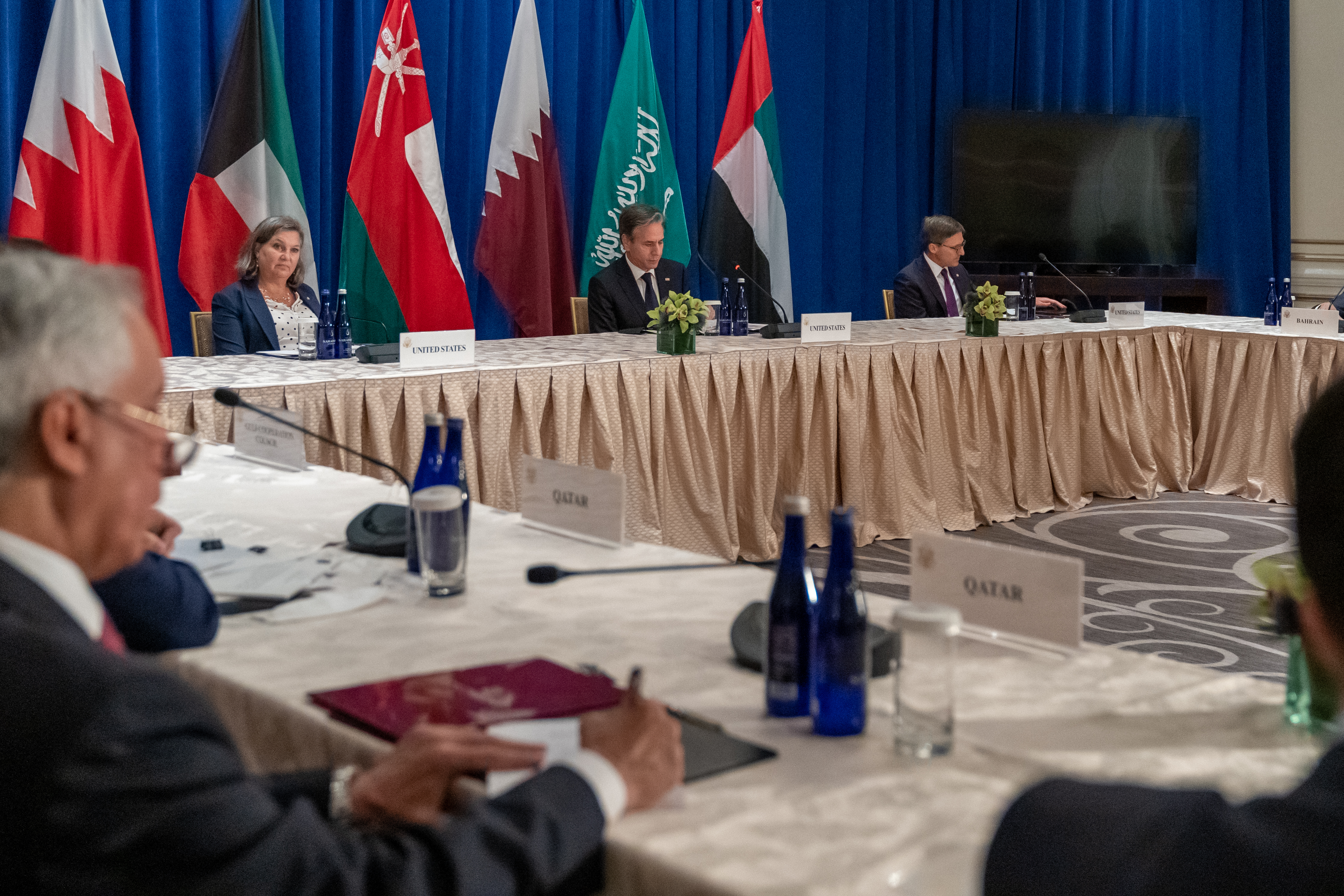
Antony Blinken meets with the Foreign Ministers of the Gulf Cooperation Council Nations during the 76th session of the UN General Assembly in New York City on September 23, 2021.

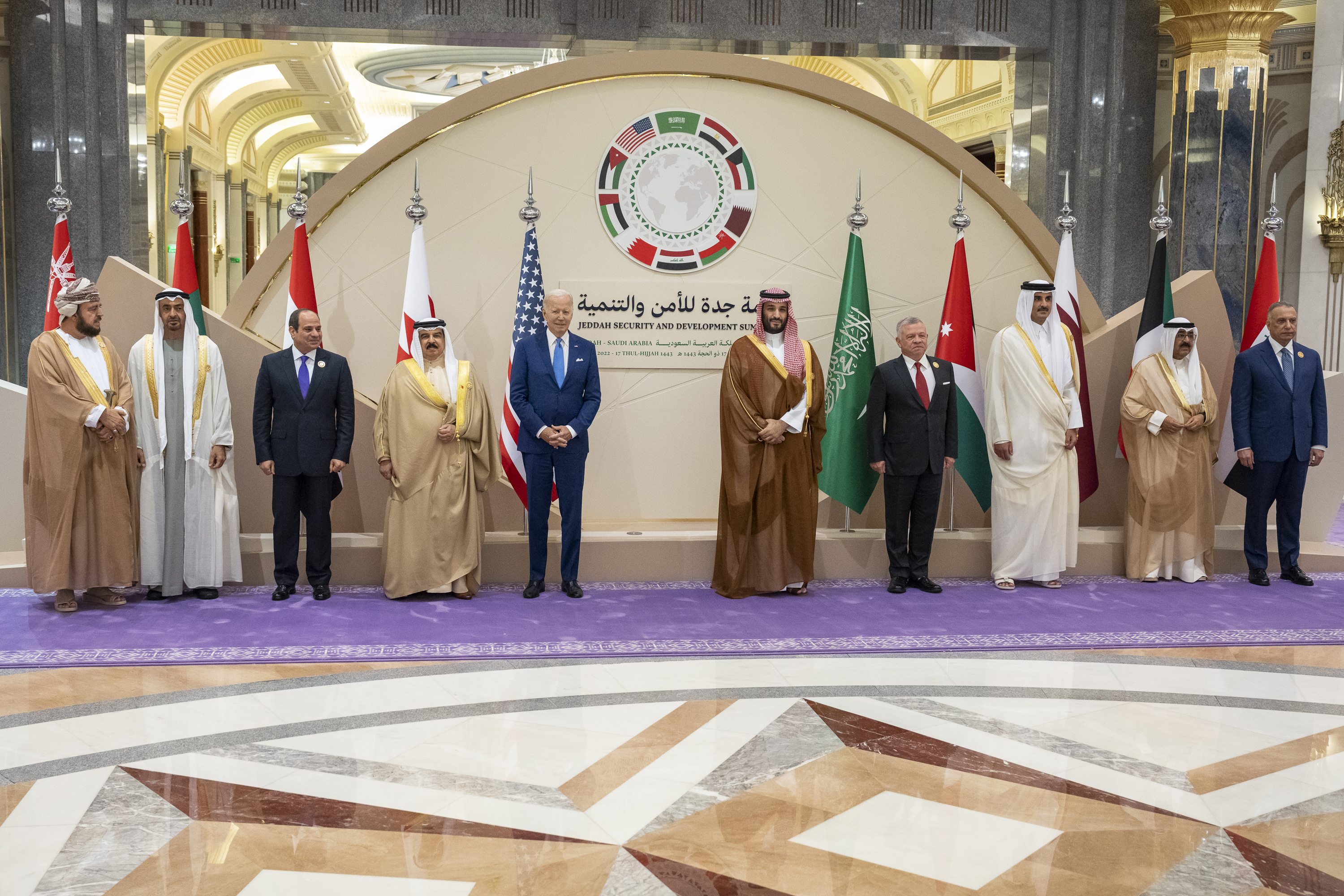
Joe Biden with GCC, Egypt, Jordan, and Iraq leaders and leaders on July 17, 2022

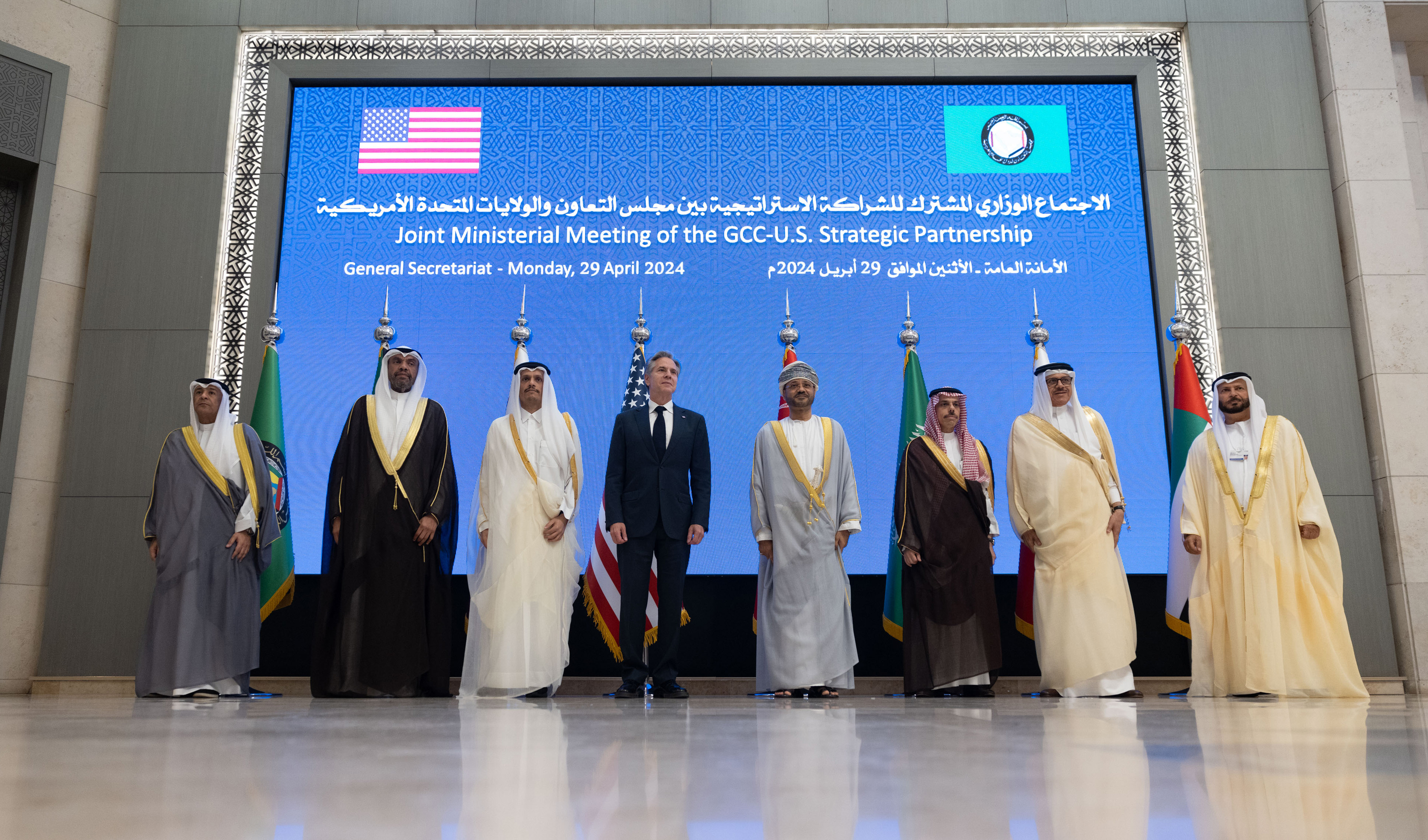
Antony Blinken meets with Foreign Ministers of the Gulf Cooperation Council Member States in Riyadh, Saudi Arabia, April 29, 2024

On September 23, 2021, Secretary of State Antony Blinken met with GCC counterparts during the Seventy-sixth session of the United Nations General Assembly. The first meeting between the Secretary of State and GCC counterparts in two years. During the meeting, Blinken thanked the GCC member states for their help with evacuations from Afghanistan.

From July 15–16, 2022, President Joe Biden visited Saudi Arabia meeting with his counterparts from the GCC, Egypt, Jordan, and Iraq for the GCC+3 summit, also known as the Jeddah Security and Development Summit. All parties affirmed a common vision in tackling regional issues such as Iran and its nuclear program, the war in Yemen, Syria, and climate change. During the meeting, Biden stated that the U.S. "will not walk away" from the region. The visit by Biden was overshadowed over controversy from his campaign promises over Saudi Arabia criticizing the Trump administration's "blank check" toward Saudi Arabia over its actions in the war in Yemen, confront Mohammed bin Salman over his role in the assassination of Jamal Khashoggi, to make the kingdom a pariah over its human rights abuses, and "America’s priorities in the Middle East should be set in Washington, not Riyadh," was all reversed and not upheld as intended. In February 2021, the Biden administration declassified an intelligence community report that implicated the powerful crown prince in Khashoggi's murder, imposed sanctions on high-ranking Saudi intelligence officials for their involvement in the plot, and restricted visas to 76 Saudis deemed responsible for the targeting of dissidents overseas, but did not end US support or involvement in Yemen despite after his inauguration, he suspended arms sales to Saudi Arabia. All of the reversals were to cooperate on economic issues of rising oil prices after the Russian invasion of Ukraine in February, but the visit did not result in lowering oil prices. In March, Saudi and UAE leaders refused calls with Biden over initial US pull-out from Yemen and reviving talks with Iran to return to the JCPOA.

Biden did confront Salman about Jamal Khashoggi, but no punishment over MBS' role was inflicted. Another controversy was Biden's fist bump with MBS as he was greeted.

On September 23, 2022, Blinken met with his GCC, Egyptian, Iraqi, and Jordanian counterparts during the Seventy-seventh session of the United Nations General Assembly. On the 24th, the U.S., Egypt, Iraq, Jordan and the GCC released a joint statement on Yemen.

From Feb 13–16, 2023, in Riyadh, the U.S. and GCC held meetings that was focused on increasing threats from Iran. The US delegation was led by Special Envoy for Iran Robert Malley and US Deputy Assistant Secretary of Defense for the Middle East Dana Stroul.

On June 7, Blinken visited Riyadh meeting with Mohammed bin Salman and the foreign ministers of the GCC. One of the agenda items was the U.S. seeking to normalize relations between Israel and the rest of the member states of the GCC outside of Bahrain and the UAE expanding the Abraham Accords. On September 18, Blinken met with his GCC counterparts during the Seventy-eighth session of the United Nations General Assembly. Both parties called for the complete demarcation of the Kuwait–Iraq maritime boundary after the Iraqi Federal Supreme Court ruled on an agreement regulating navigation in the Khor Abdullah waterway between the two states as unconstitutional.

On April 29, 2024, Blinken attended the joint ministerial meeting with the GCC in Riyadh where the main subject was the Gaza war in which the U.S. and the GCC called for more aid into the Gaza Strip and for a ceasefire to be accepted by both Israel and Hamas. On September 24, Blinken for the last time met with his GCC counterparts during the Seventy-ninth session of the United Nations General Assembly. Blinken said that the U.S. and the GCC were working tirelessly to avoid a full-blown war between Israel and Hezbollah.

=== Second Trump administration ===
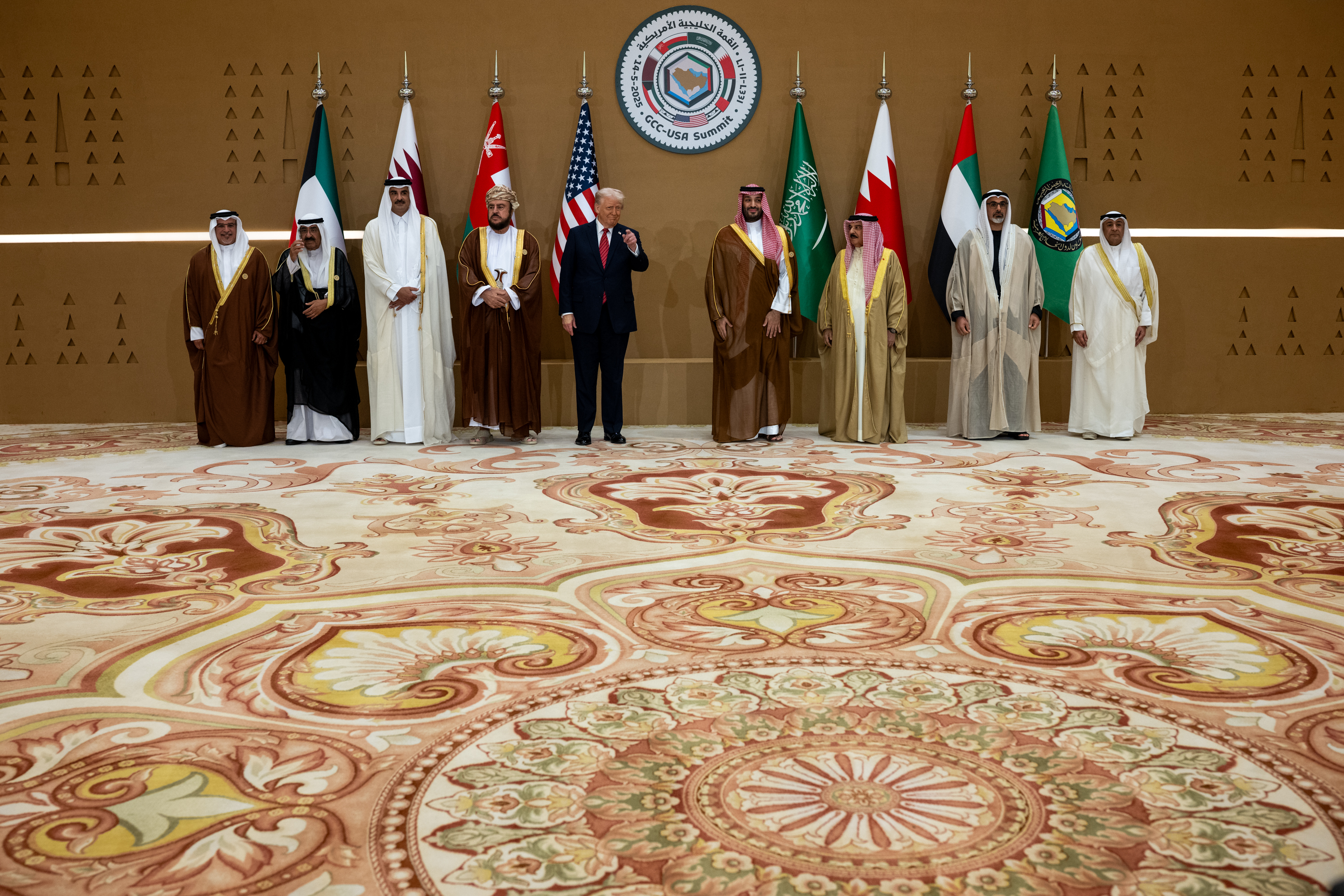
Donald Trump with his counterparts of the GCC on May 14, 2025, in Riyadh, Saudi Arabia before the US–GCC summit.

Following the return of Donald Trump after winning the 2024 United States presidential election, Trump vowed to work closer with the GCC. Nine years after his first GCC summit in 2017, as part of his visit to the Middle East, he visited Saudi Arabia from May 13–14, 2025. He attended the GCC summit with his counterparts from the member states on May 14. Much of the discussion was about the War in Gaza, Yemen, supporting Syria after the fall of the Assad regime, and Iran's nuclear program after the start of 2025–2026 Iran–United States negotiations in April.

On September 24, Secretary of State Marco Rubio met with his GCC counterparts during the Eightieth session of the United Nations General Assembly where the U.S. pledged to build a stable Syria and discussions about Gaza where during the meeting the bloc condemned the Israeli attack on Doha targeting Hamas leaders on September 9.

Following the outbreak of the 2026 Iran war started by joint U.S.–Israeli strikes on Iran from February 28, 2026, all GCC states were exposed to Iranian attacks on their critical energy infrastructure and U.S. bases on their territory. According to diplomats, GCC states, particularly Saudi Arabia, supported continued strikes on Iran until the Iranian threat is reduced through changes in the Iranian leadership or a shift in Iranian behavior, while the United Arab Emirates, Kuwait, and Bahrain supported a ground invasion of Iran. The UAE has reportedly been discreetly attacking Iran throughout the war, which included a strike on an oil refinery on Lavan Island.

== Economic relations ==
On September 27, 2012, United States Trade Representative Ron Kirk announced a deal was reached between the United States and the GCC called the Framework Agreement for Trade, Economic, Investment and Technical Cooperation between the Cooperation Council for the Arab States of the Gulf and the Government of the United States of America. The agreement called for to supplement and build upon the existing individual trade agreements the member states have signed with the U.S. The agreement was signed on September 25 during the Sixty-seventh session of the United Nations General Assembly.

In April 2014, the U.S.-GCC Business Initiative was launched to further expand on the economic relations between the U.S. and the GCC.

== Military cooperation ==
In 2006, the Gulf Security Dialogue was launched as an effort to revive U.S.-Gulf Cooperation Council security cooperation. The core objectives of the Dialogue are the promotion of intra-GCC and GCC-U.S. cooperation to meet common perceived threats. The Dialogue provides a framework for U.S. engagement with the GCC countries in six areas. Improvement of GCC defense capabilities and interoperability, regional security issues such as the Israeli-Palestinian conflict and Lebanon, counter-proliferation, counter-terrorism and internal security, critical infrastructure protection, and commitments to Iraq. However, the GSD is not a single summit or event as it is instead a bilateral meeting between the U.S. and the individual nations of GCC.

In December 2013, then-Secretary of Defense Chuck Hagel announced that the United States would sell weapons to the GCC nations to strengthen collective defense capabilities with the aim of the organization to purchase American weapons as a collective rather than as individual states. The sale was to grow security cooperation in the region. Hagel described the sale as, "This is a natural next step in improving U.S.-GCC collaboration and it will enable the GCC to acquire critical military capabilities, including items for ballistic missile defense, maritime security and counterterrorism."

On May 14, 2014, Hagel held talks with his GCC counterparts at the US-GCC Defense Minister Forum in Riyadh. This was the first such forum since 2008. The meeting primarily revolved around reinforcing the capabilities of the GCC on missile defense, cyber-security, and air and maritime security. Hagel assured the GCC that a deal with Iran over its nuclear program wouldn't result in a decrease in military support.

On April 20, 2016, Secretary of Defense Ash Carter attended his first US-GCC Defense Minister Forum in Riyadh. The US-GCC Defense Minister Forum has not been held since 2016.

== See also ==
- Foreign relations of the United States
- Foreign policy of the United States
- Arab–American relations
- Arab lobby in the United States
- United States foreign policy in the Middle East
- United States–Middle East economic relations
- Bahrain–United States relations
- Kuwait–United States relations
- Oman–United States relations
- Qatar–United States relations
- Saudi Arabia–United States relations
- United Arab Emirates–United States relations
