= General debate of the sixty-fourth session of the United Nations General Assembly =

- 23 – 29 September 2009 64th session 64th general debate

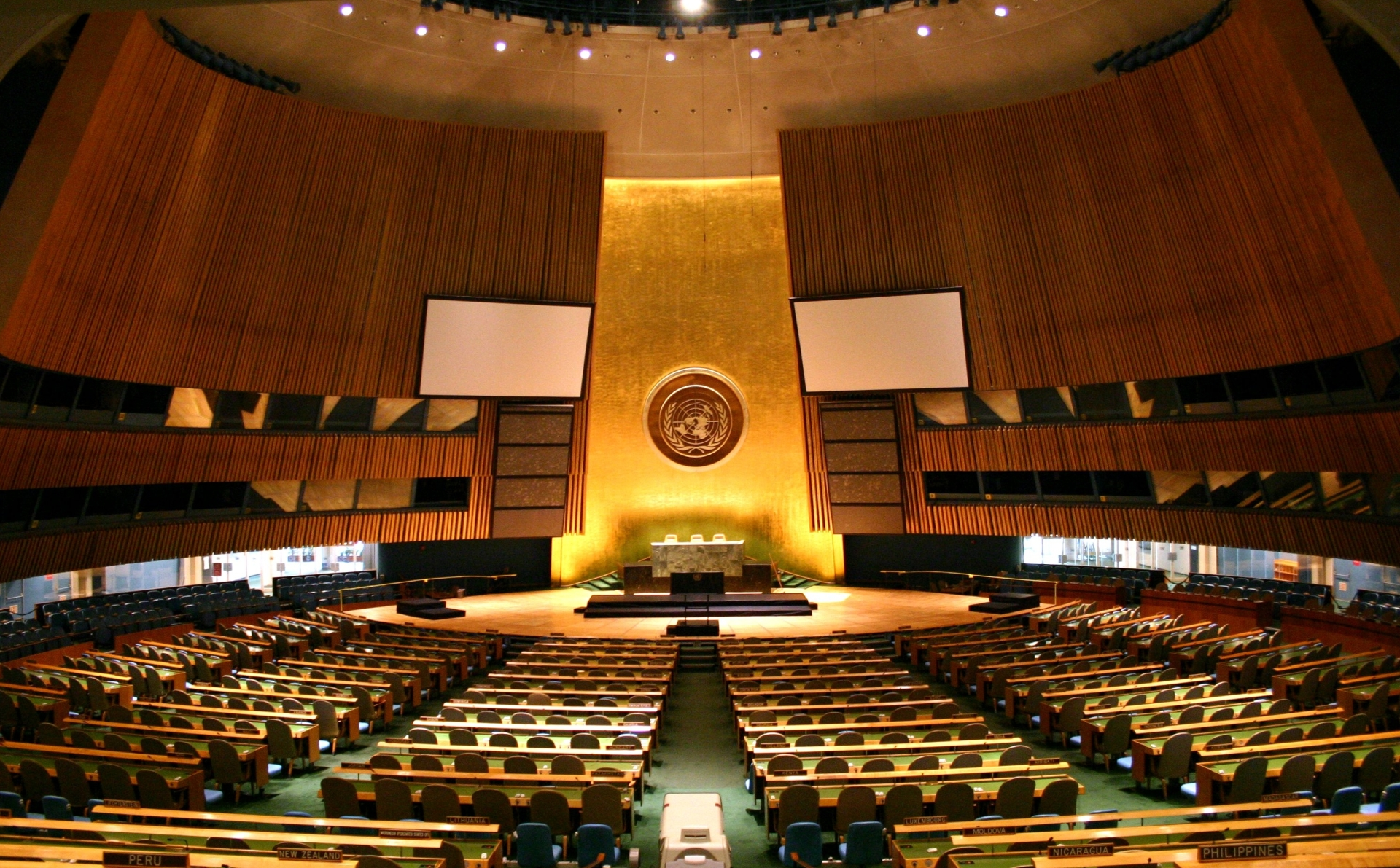
- General Assembly Hall at United Nations Headquarters, New York City
- Host country: United Nations
- Cities: New York City, United States
- Venues: General Assembly Hall at the United Nations Headquarters
- Participants: United Nations Member States
- President: Ali Abdussalam Treki
- Secretary-General: Ban Ki-moon
- Website: www.un.org/en/ga/64/

The general debate of the sixty-fourth session of the United Nations General Assembly was the first debate of the 64th session of the United Nations General Assembly that ran from 23–29 September 2009. Leaders from a number of member states addressed the General Assembly.

== Organisation ==
The speaking order of the general debate is different from the speaking order of other General Assembly debates. For the general debate, the secretary-general speaks first delivering their "Report of the Secretary-General on the work of the Organization, " they are then followed by: the president of the General Assembly who opens the general debate, the delegate from Brazil and the Delegate from the United States of America. After this, the order is first given to Member States, then Observer States and supranational bodies. For all other member states, the speaking order is based on their level of representation at the general debate, order preference and other criteria such as geographic balance.

According to the rules in place for the general debate, statements should be made in one of the United Nations' official languages of Arabic, Chinese, English, French, Russian or Spanish, and are translated by United Nations translators. Additionally, speakers are usually limited to a 15-minute time limit in order to comply with the schedule set up by the General Committee. Member States are also advised to provide 350 paper copies of their statements in order for them to be distributed to other Member States, as well as to translation services.

The theme for the 64th session was chosen by President Ali Abdussalam Treki as: "Effective responses to global crises: strengthening multilateralism and dialogue among civilizations for international peace, security and development."

== Speaking schedule ==
=== 23 September ===
Morning session

- United Nations – Secretary-General Ban Ki-moon (Report of the Secretary-General on the work of the Organization)
- United Nations – President of the 64th session of the General Assembly Ali Abdussalam Treki (Opening)
- Brazil – President Luiz Inácio Lula da Silva
- United States – President Barack Obama
- Libya – Leader of the Revolution Colonel Muammar Al-Qadhafi
- Uganda – President Yoweri Kaguta Museveni
- Qatar – Amir Hamad bin Khalifa Al-Thani
- Turkmenistan – President Gurbanguly Berdimuhamedov
- Chile – President Michelle Bachelet Jeria
- Uruguay – President Tabaré Vázquez
- Algeria – President Abdelaziz Bouteflika
- Republic of Korea – President Lee Myung-bak
- France – President Nicolas Sarkozy
- Sweden – Prime Minister Fredrik Reinfeldt
- Italy – President of the Council of Ministers Silvio Berlusconi
- UK – Prime Minister Gordon Brown

Afternoon session

- Argentina – President Cristina Fernández de Kirchner
- Tajikistan – President Emomali Rahmon
- China – President Hu Jintao
- Monaco – Prince Albert II
- Colombia – President Álvaro Uribe Vélez
- Russian Federation – President Dmitry Medvedev
- South Africa – President Jacob Zuma
- Czech Republic – President Václav Klaus
- El Salvador – President Carlos Mauricio Funes Cartagena
- Equatorial Guinea – President Teodoro Obiang Nguema Mbasogo
- Dominican Republic – President Leonel Fernández Reyna
- Iran (Islamic Republic of) – President Mahmoud Ahmadinejad
- Bolivia (Plurinational State of) – President Evo Morales Ayma
- Ukraine – President Victor Yushchenko
- Poland – President Lech Kaczyński
- Australia – Prime Minister Kevin Rudd

=== 24 September ===
Morning session

- Comoros – President Ahmed Abdallah Mohamed Sambi
- Ghana – President John Evans Atta Mills
- Bosnia and Herzegovina – Chairman of the Presidency Željko Komšić
- Rwanda – President Paul Kagame
- Lithuania – President Dalia Grybauskaite
- Cyprus – President Demetris Christofias
- Sao Tome and Principe – President Fradique Bandeira melo de Menezes
- Sierra Leone – President Ernest Bai Koroma
- Panama – President Ricardo Martinelli Berrocal
- Switzerland – President Hans-Rudolf Merz
- Spain – Prime Minister José Luis Rodríguez Zapatero
- Japan – Prime Minister Yukio Hatoyama
- Turkey – Prime Minister Recep Tayyip Erdoğan
- Israel – Prime Minister Benjamin Netanyahu

Afternoon session

- Venezuela (Bolivarian Republic of) – President Hugo Rafael Chávez Frías
- Slovenia – President Danilo Türk
- Guyana – President Bharrat Jagdeo
- Costa Rica – President Óscar Arias Sánchez
- United Republic of Tanzania – President Jakaya Mrisho Kikwete
- Latvia – President Valdis Zatlers
- Malawi – President Bingu Wa Mutharika
- Iraq – President Jalal Talabani
- Gambia (Republic of The) – President Al Hadji Yahya Jammeh
- Paraguay – President Fernando Lugo Méndez
- Maldives – President Mohamed Nasheed
- Guatemala – President Álvaro Colom Caballeros
- Haiti – President René Préval
- Senegal – President Abdoulaye Wade
- Finland – President Tarja Halonen
- Zambia – President Rupiah Bwezani Banda
- Croatia – President Stjepan Mesić
- Marshall Islands – President Litokwa Tomeing
- Malta – Prime Minister Lawrence Gonzi
- Georgia – President Mikheil Saakashvili

=== 25 September ===
Morning session

- Zimbabwe – President Robert Mugabe
- Nauru – President Marcus Stephen
- Palau – President Johnson Toribiong
- Estonia – President Toomas Hendrik Ilves
- Côte d’Ivoire – President Laurent Gbagbo
- Burkina Faso – President Blaise Compaoré
- Lebanon – President Michel Sleiman
- Somalia – President Sharif Sheikh Ahmed
- Macedonia – President Gjorge Ivanov
- Dominica – President Nicholas Joseph Orville Liverpool
- Kiribati – President Anote Tong
- Pakistan – President Asif Ali Zardari
- Palestine (State of) – President Mahmoud Abbas
- Antigua and Barbuda – Prime Minister Winston Baldwin Spencer
- Kuwait – Prime Minister Nasser Al-Mohammad Al-Ahmad Al Jaber Al-Sab
- Mauritius – Prime Minister Navinchandra Ramgoolam

Afternoon session

- Serbia – President Boris Tadić
- Micronesia (Federated States of) – President Emanuel Mori
- Congo – President Denis Sassou-Nguesso
- Swaziland – Head of State Mswati III
- Mongolia – President Elbegdorj Tsakhia
- Cameroon – President Paul Biya
- Viet Nam – President Nguyen Minh Triet
- Suriname – Vice-President Ramdien Sardjoe
- Liberia – Vice-President Joseph Boakai
- Kenya – Prime Minister Raila Amollo Odinga
- New Zealand – Prime Minister John Key
- Montenegro – Prime Minister Milo Đukanović
- Central African Republic – Prime Minister Faustin Archange Touadera
- Vanuatu – Prime Minister Edward Nipake Natapei
- Luxembourg – Deputy Prime Minister Jean Asselborn
- Bahamas – Deputy Prime Minister Theodore Brent Symonette
- Solomon Islands – Deputy Prime Minister Fredrick Fono
- Kazakhstan – Secretary of State Kanat Saudabayev
- Benin – Minister for Foreign Affairs Jean-Marie Ehouzou
- Philippines – Secretary for Foreign Affairs Alberto Romulo
- Azerbaijan – Minister for Foreign Affairs Elmar Maharram oglu Mammadyarov
- Gabon – Minister for Foreign Affairs Paul Toungui

=== 26 September ===
Morning session

- Burundi – Vice-President Gabriel Ntisezerana
- Thailand – Prime Minister Abhisit Vejjajiva
- Netherlands – Prime Minister Jan Peter Balkenende
- Kyrgyzstan – Prime Minister Igor Chudinov
- Tuvalu – Prime Minister Apisai Ielemia
- Trinidad and Tobago – Prime Minister Patrick Manning
- Samoa – Prime Minister Tuila'epa Lupesoliai Sailele Malielegaoi
- Bangladesh – Prime Minister Sheikh Hasina
- Saint Kitts and Nevis – Prime Minister Denzil Douglas
- Lesotho – Prime Minister Pakalitha Bethuel Mosisili
- Nepal – Prime Minister Madhav Kumar Nepal
- Tonga – Prime Minister Feleti Vaka'uta Sevele
- Lao People’s Democratic Republic – Deputy Prime Minister Thongloun Sisoulith
- Egypt – Minister for Foreign Affairs Ahmed Aboul Gheit
- Jordan – Minister for Foreign Affairs Nasser Judeh
- Slovakia – Minister for Foreign Affairs Miroslav Lajčák
- Morocco – Minister for Foreign Affairs Taïb Fassi Fihri

Afternoon session

- Albania – Prime Minister Sali Berisha
- Fiji – Prime Minister Josaia Bainimarama
- Guinea-Bissau – Prime Minister Carlos Gomes Junior
- Sri Lanka – Prime Minister Ratnasiri Wickramanayake
- Cambodia – Deputy Prime Minister Hor Namhong
- Jamaica – Deputy Prime Minister Kenneth Baugh
- Austria – Minister for Foreign Affairs Michael Spindelegger
- United Arab Emirates – Minister for Foreign Affairs Abdullah Bin Zayed Al Nahyan
- Belgium – Minister for Foreign Affairs Yves Leterme
- India – Minister of External Affairs S. M. Krishna
- Bulgaria – Minister for Foreign Affairs Rumiana Jeleva
- Iceland – Minister for Foreign Affairs Össur Skarphéðinsson
- Belarus – Minister for Foreign Affairs Sergei Martynov
- Ethiopia – Minister for Foreign Affairs Seyoum Mesfin
- Romania – Minister for Foreign Affairs Cristian Diaconescu
- Brunei Darussalam – Minister for Foreign Affairs Mohamed Bolkiah
- Liechtenstein – Minister for Foreign Affairs Aurelia Frick
- Canada – Minister for Foreign Affairs Lawrence Cannon
- Andorra – Minister for Foreign Affairs Xavier Espot Miró

Rights of Reply
Islamic Republic of Iran
The delegation of Iran used its right of reply to place on record their position on two issues. First, it responded to claims by various delegations, in particular the delegations of the Netherlands, Slovakia, Austria and Canada, in regards to its nuclear program. Iran stated that its nuclear activities have always been for peaceful purposes, and that they have always observed their legal obligations under the Treaty on the Non-Proliferation of Nuclear Weapons. It further stated that more attention should be paid to "un-safeguarded and secretive nuclear weapons installations of the Zionist regime."

Secondly, it responded to the United Arab Emirates regarding its territorial integrity and the sovereignty of three islands in the Persian Gulf, namely Bu Musa, Greater Tunb and Lesser Tunb. These islands are claimed by the United Arab Emirates, and in their General Assembly speech called for their return. Iran, however, considers these islands to be an integral part of Iranian territory. It stated that all actions taken on these islands have been in exercise of its sovereign rights.

Serbia
The delegation of Serbia used its right of reply to respond to statements made by the Prime Minister of the Albania, Sali Berisha. In his speech before the Assembly, the Prime Minister added his support to the independence of Kosovo from Serbia. He also urged Member States to recognize Kosovo and uphold General Assembly Resolution 49/204, which called for an end to human rights violations against ethnic Albanians in Kosovo, as well as the establishment of democratic institutions in Kosovo.

Serbia responded by denouncing Mr. Berisha's attempts to interfere in the internal affairs of other United Nations Member States. Serbia also stated that his remarks were deplorable, especially when the legality of Kosovo's secession was being considered by the International Court of Justice. Finally, Serbia stated that, contrary to Mr. Berisha's statements, inter-ethnic tensions in Kosovo have not been reduced, but rather "frozen in uneasy expectation."

United Arab Emirates
The delegation of the United Arab Emirates used its right of reply to respond to statements made in the right of reply of the Islamic Republic of Iran. HH. Abdullah Bin Zayed Al Nahyan re-emphasized that the United Arab Emirates considers Bu Musa, Greater Tunb and Lesser Tunb as integral parts of Emirati territory and called upon Iran to engage in unconditional, serious and direct bilateral negotiations in order reach a final outcome of the dispute. He also suggested that, if no resolution could be found, the case be sent to the International Court of Justice for a legal opinion.

Albania
The delegation of Albania used its right of reply to respond to statements made in the right of reply of Serbia. Albania stated that the Republic of Kosovo was an undeniable reality, and that it would one day finally achieve its independence. While agreeing that the issue was still divisive, the delegation pointed out that the number of countries recognizing Kosovo has only increased. Finally, the delegation stated that it reserves the right to advocate for the independence of Kosovo as a neighboring state that could be possibly affected by any conflicts over the region.

=== 28 September ===
Morning session

- San Marino – Minister for Foreign Affairs Antonella Mularoni
- Namibia – Minister for Foreign Affairs Marco Hausiku
- Peru – Minister for Foreign Affairs José Antonio García Belaúnde
- Myanmar – Prime Minister Thein Sein
- Mexico – Secretary for Foreign Affairs Patricia Espinosa Cantellano
- Bahrain – Minister for Foreign Affairs Khalid Bin Ahmed Bin Mohamed Alkhalifa
- Cuba – Minister for Foreign Affairs Bruno Rodriguez Parrilla
- Tunisia – Minister for Foreign Affairs Abdelwaheb Abdallah
- Eritrea – Minister for Foreign Affairs Osman Mohammed Saleh
- Syrian Arab Republic – Minister for Foreign Affairs Walid Al-Moualem
- Niger – Minister for Foreign Affairs Aichatou Mindaoudou
- Sudan – Acting Foreign Minister Ghazi Salahuddin Atabani
- Democratic Republic of the Congo – Minister for Foreign Affairs Alexis Thambwe Mwamba
- Oman – Minister for Foreign Affairs Yousef Bin Al-Alawi Bin Abdullah
- Belize – Attorney General Wilfred Elrington
- Singapore – Minister for Foreign Affairs George Yeo
- Hungary – Minister for Foreign Affairs Péter Balázs
- Bhutan – Minister for Foreign Affairs Lyonpo Ugyen Tshering

Afternoon session

- Mauritania – Minister for Foreign Affairs Naha Mint Mouknass
- Ireland – Minister of State Peter Power
- Yemen – Minister for Foreign Affairs Abubakr Al-Qirbi
- Uzbekistan – Minister for Foreign Affairs Vladimir Norov
- Mozambique – Minister for Foreign Affairs Oldemiro Marques Baloi
- Armenia – Minister for Foreign Affairs Edward Nalbandian
- Barbados – Minister for Foreign Affairs Maxine Pamela Ometa McClean
- Chad – Minister for Foreign Affairs Moussa Faki Mahamat
- Guinea – Minister for Foreign Affairs Alexandre Cécé Loua
- Saint Lucia – Minister of External Affairs Rufus George Bousquet
- Ecuador – Minister for Foreign Affairs Fander Falconi
- Angola – Minister of External Affairs Assunçaõ Afonso dos Anjos
- Timor-Leste – Minister for Foreign Affairs Zacarias Albano Da Costa
- Malaysia – Minister for Foreign Affairs Anifah Aman
- Afghanistan – Minister for Foreign Affairs Rangin Dâdfar Spantâ
- Nigeria – Minister for Foreign Affairs Ojo Maduekwe
- Honduras – Minister for Foreign Affairs Patricia Isabel Rodas Baca
- Democratic People’s Republic of Korea – Vice Minister for Foreign Affairs Pak Kil Yon
- Portugal – Secretary for Foreign Affairs João Gomes Cravinho
- Germany – Chairman Thomas Matussek

=== 29 September ===
Morning session

- Grenada – Minister for Foreign Affairs and Foreign Trade Peter David
- Papua New Guinea – Minister of External Affairs Samuel Abal
- Nicaragua – Minister for Foreign Affairs Samuel Santos López
- Norway – Minister for Foreign Affairs Jonas Gahr Støre
- Indonesia – Minister for Foreign Affairs Hassan Wirajuda
- Djibouti – Permanent Representative Roble Olhaye
- Cabo Verde – Chair of the Delegation Antonio Pedro Monteiro Lima
- Saint Vincent and the Grenadines – Chair of the Delegation Camillo Gonsalves
- Republic of Moldova – Chair of the Delegation Alexandru Cujba
- Greece – Chair of the Delegation Anastassis Mitsialis
- Denmark – Chair of the Delegation Carsten Staur
- Seychelles – Chair of the Delegation Ronald Jean Jumeau
- Togo – Chair of the Delegation Kodjo Menan
- Mali – Chair of the Delegation Oumar Daou
- Botswana – Chair of the Delegation Charles Thembani Ntwaaggae
- Holy See – Archbishop Celestino Migliore
- United Nations – President of the 64th session of the General Assembly Ali Abdussalam Treki (Closing)

== See also ==
- List of UN General Assembly sessions
- List of General debates of the United Nations General Assembly
