= Sixty-fourth session of the United Nations General Assembly =

- 15 September 2009 – 14 September 2010 64th session 64th general debate
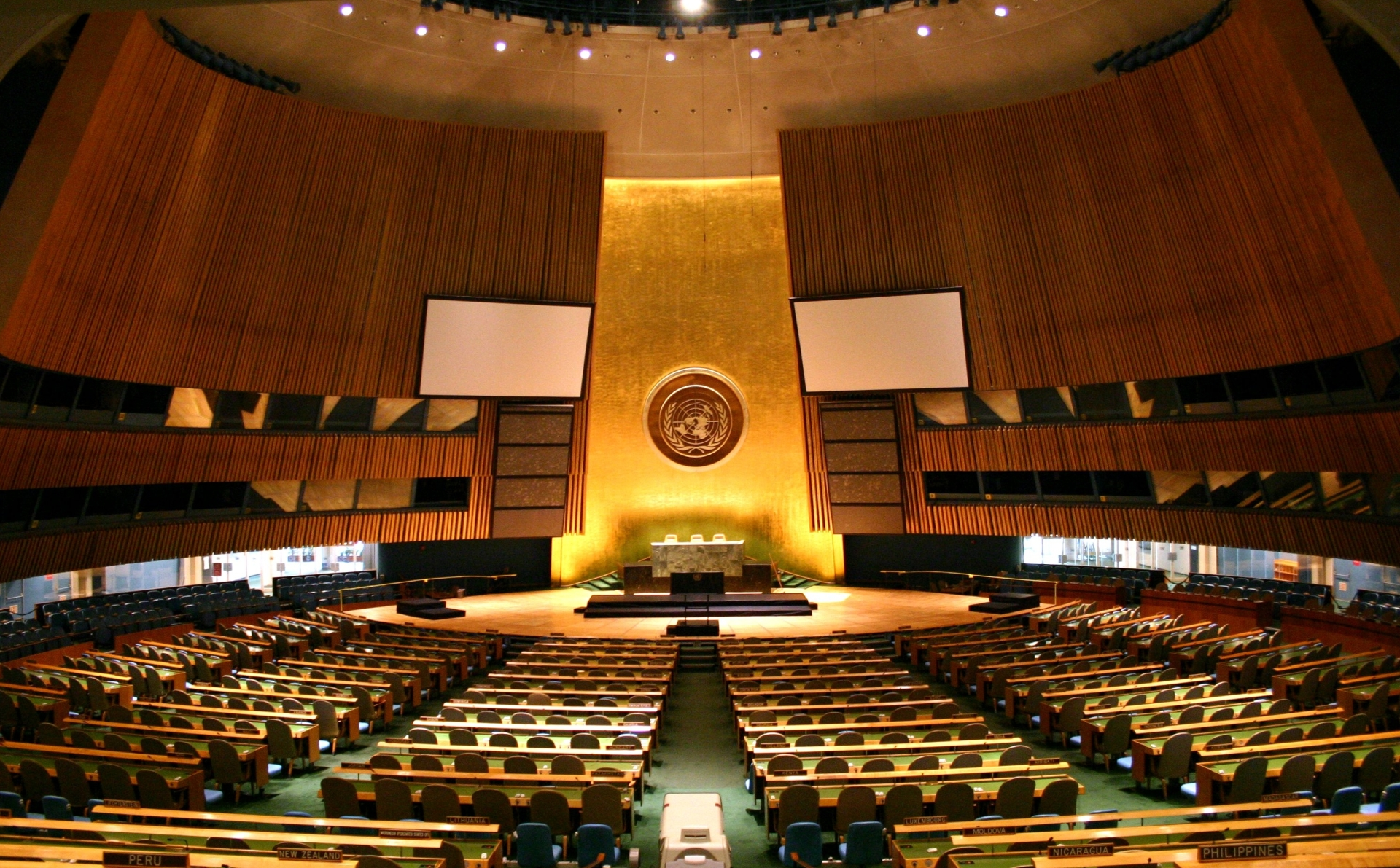
- General Assembly Hall at United Nations Headquarters, New York City
- Host country: United Nations
- Cities: New York City, United States
- Venues: General Assembly Hall at the United Nations Headquarters
- Participants: United Nations Member States
- President: Ali Abdussalam Treki
- Secretary-General: Ban Ki-moon
- Website: www.un.org/en/ga/64/

The Sixty-fourth session of the United Nations General Assembly was the session of the United Nations General Assembly that ran from 15 September 2009 to 14 September 2010. The President of the session, Ali Abdussalam Treki of Libya, was elected from the Group of African States on 10 June 2009 by acclamation.

The theme for the 64th Session was "Effective responses to global crises: strengthening multilateralism and dialogue among civilizations for international peace, security and development."

== Organisation ==
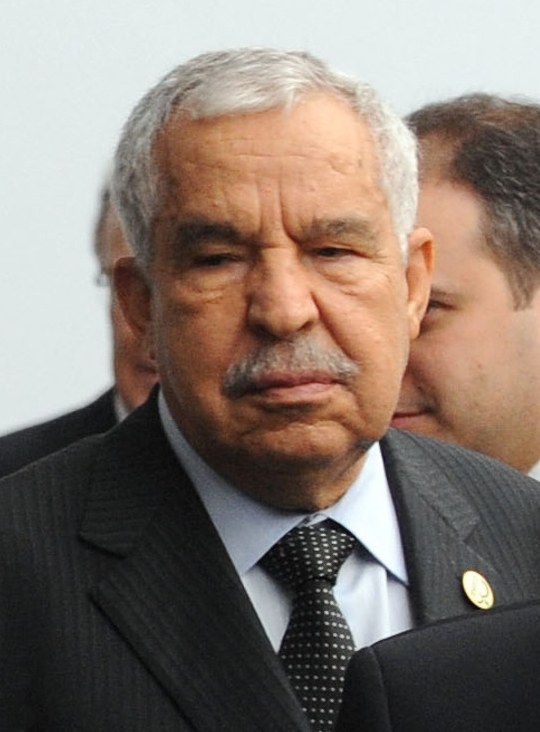
President of the 64th Session, Ali Abdussalam Treki

=== President ===
Libyan diplomat and politician Ali Abdussalam Treki was elected by acclimation to the position of President of the General Assembly on 11 June 2010. At the time of his election, Treki was serving as Libya's Minister of African Union Affairs.

In his first speech as President-elect of the General Assembly, Treki laid out some of his priorities for the session. Paramount among them was the need to reform the United Nations system, especially reform of the Security Council and revitalization of the General Assembly. Other issues Treki sought to focus on included: combating climate change, realizing human rights for all, disarmament and the realization of peace and achieving sustainable economic growth by mitigating the impact of the world financial crisis.

=== Vice-Presidents ===
The following were appointed to be the Session's vice-presidents on the 11 June 2010:

The five permanent members of the Security Council:

- China
- France
- Russia
- United Kingdom of Great Britain and Northern Ireland
- United States of America

As well as the following nations:

- Barbados
- Belgium
- Cameroon
- El Salvador
- Finland
- Ghana
- Guinea-Bissau
- India
- Kazakhstan
- Maldives
- Nepal
- Slovenia
- South Africa
- Sudan
- Turkmenistan
- Venezuela, Bolivarian Republic of

=== Committees ===
First Committee (Disarmament and International Security)
Name	Country	Position
H.E. Mr. José Luis Cancela	Uruguay	Chairperson
Mr. Hossam Aly	Egypt	Vice-chair
Mr. Hilario G. Davide Jr.	Philippines	Vice-chair
Mr. Florian Laudi	Germany	Vice-chair
Ms. Tetyana Pokhval’ona	Ukraine	Rapporteur

Second Committee (Economic and Financial)
Name	Country	Position
H.E. Mr. Park In-kook	Republic of Korea	Chairperson
Mr. Mohamed Cherif Diallo	Guinea	Vice-chair
Mr. Carlos Enrique García González	El Salvador	Vice-chair
Mr. Dragan Mićić	Serbia	Vice-chair
Ms. Denise McQuade	Ireland	Rapporteur

Third Committee (Social, Humanitarian and Cultural)
Name	Country	Position
H.E. Mr. Normans Penke	Latvia	Chairperson
Ms. Fiola Hoosen	South Africa	Vice-chair
Mr. Edgard Pérez	Peru	Vice-chair
Mr. Zahid Rastam	Malaysia	Vice-chair
Ms. Nicola Hill	New Zealand	Rapporteur

Fourth Committee (Special Political and Decolonization)
Name	Country	Position
H.E. Mr. Nassir Abdulaziz Al-Nasser	Qatar	Chairperson
Mr. Ridas Petkus	Lithuania	Vice-chair
Mrs. Heidi Schroderus-Fox	Finland	Vice-chair
Mr. Reniery Valladares	Honduras	Vice-chair
Mr. Khalid Mohammed Osman Sidahmed Mohammed Ali	Sudan	Rapporteur

Fifth Committee (Administrative and Budgetary)
Name	Country	Position
H.E. Mr. Peter Maurer	Switzerland	Chairperson
Mr. Danilo Rosales Díaz	Nicaragua	Vice-chair
Mr. Babou Sène	Senegal	Vice-chair
Ms. Sirithon wairatpanij	Thailand	Vice-chair
Ms. Yuliana Georgiev	Bulgaria	Rapporteur

Sixth Committee (Legal)
Name	Country	Position
H.E. Mr. Mourad Benmehidi	Algeria	Chairperson
Mr. Esmaeil Bahaei Hamaneh	Iran (Islamic Republic of)	Vice-chair
Mr. Andris Stastoli	Albania	Vice-chair
Mr. Marcelo Böhlke	Brazil	Vice-chair
Mr. Jean-Cédric Janssens de Bisthoven	Belgium	Rapporteur

=== Seat allocation ===
As is tradition, before each session of the General Assembly, the Secretary-General draws lots to determine which Member State will occupy the first seat in the General Assembly Hall for the Session, with other Member States following according to the English translation of their name. For the 65th Session, Cambodia was chosen to take the first seat of the General Assembly Chamber.

=== General debate ===
The General Debate of the 64th Session was held between 24–26 and 28–29 September 2009. At the General debate, Member States have the opportunity to lay out the issues that are most concerning to them, as well as their hopes as to what the General Assembly will do during the Session.

The order of speakers is given first to Member States, then Observer States and supranational bodies. Speakers are put on a speaking list in the order of their request, with special consideration for ministers and other government officials of similar or higher rank. According to the rules in place for the General Debate, the statements should be in one of the United Nations official languages of Arabic, Chinese, English, French, Russian or Spanish, and will be translated by the United Nations translators.

== Elections ==
=== Security Council ===
On 15 October 2009, the General Assembly elected five non-permanent members to the Security Council to two-year terms beginning on 1 January 2010. The five elected members were: Bosnia and Herzegovina, Brazil, Gabon, Lebanon and Nigeria. They filled the seats that were vacated by Burkina Faso, Costa Rica, Croatia, Libya and Viet Nam.

=== Economic and Social Council ===
On 26 October 2009, the General Assembly elected 18 members to the Economic and Social Council to serve three-year terms beginning 1 January 2010. The elected members were: Argentina, Bahamas, Bangladesh, Belgium, Canada, Chile, Comoros, Egypt, Ghana, Iraq, Italy, Mongolia, Philippines, Rwanda, Slovakia, Ukraine, United States of America and Zambia.

The 18 outgoing members were: Algeria, Barbados, Belarus, Bolivia, Canada, Cabo Verde, El Salvador, Indonesia, Iraq, Kazakhstan, Luxembourg, Malawi, Netherlands, Philippines, Romania, Somalia, Sudan and the United States of America.

Prior to the main election, the General Assembly, in a by-election, also elected Australia, Finland, Malta and Turkey to fill un-expired terms of office of New Zealand, Sweden, Greece and Portugal beginning 1 January 2010. The terms of Australia and Finland will end on 31 December 2010, while the terms of Malta and Turkey will end on 31 December 2011.

=== Human Rights Council ===
On 13 May 2010, the General Assembly elected 14 members to serve on the Human Rights Council for three-year terms starting 19 June 2010. The elected members were: Angola, Ecuador, Guatemala, Libyan Arab Jamahiriya, Malaysia, Maldives, Mauritania, Poland, Qatar, Republic of Moldova, Spain, Switzerland, Thailand and Uganda.

=== International Court of Justice ===
On 9 September 2010, the General Assembly elected Joan Donoghue of the United States of America to the International Court of Justice to fill the remainder of the term of Judge Thomas Buergenthal of the United States of America. Mr. Buergenthal was first elected to the Court in 2000, and was re-elected on 6 February 2006. His term would have originally ended on 5 February 2015.

== See also ==
- List of UN General Assembly sessions
- List of General debates of the United Nations General Assembly
