= Alexandre Cécé Loua =

Guinean diplomat

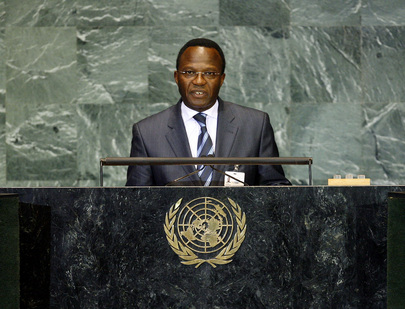
Alexandre Cécé Loua

Alexandre Cécé Loua (born 1956) is a Guinean diplomat who served in the government of Guinea as Minister of Foreign Affairs from 2009 to 2010. Previously he was an ambassador to various countries.

== Diplomatic career ==
Cécé Loua was born in Nzérékoré. From 1 December 1986 to 26 December 1994, he was head of the Legal Affairs Division at the Ministry of Foreign Affairs. He was also a Guinean delegate at meetings of various international organizations during the 1980s and 1990s, including the 48th Session of the United Nations General Assembly from September to December 1993 and the 50th Session of the United Nations General Assembly from September to December 1995. He was Ambassador and National Director of Legal and Consular Affairs at the Ministry of Foreign Affairs from 27 December 1994 to 12 April 1996 and Ambassador to Yugoslavia, with additional accreditation for Bulgaria and Macedonia, from 12 April 1996 to June 1998. From 1995 to 1996, he was a member of the National Coordination Committee of Liberian and Sierra Leonean Refugees in Guinea.

Later, Cécé Loua served as Guinea's Ambassador to South Africa, Angola, Botswana, Mozambique, Namibia, Mauritius, Zimbabwe, and Madagascar until 31 January 2007, when he instead became Ambassador to Germany. After nearly two years in that post, he was appointed to the Guinean government as Minister of Foreign Affairs and Guineans Abroad on 14 January 2009, following the December 2008 military coup d'état.

After junta leader Moussa Dadis Camara was shot in the head and wounded on 3 December 2009, Cécé Loua said that Camara had undergone surgery and that his condition was good. He visited Camara at a hospital in Morocco and told the press on 7 December 2009 that Camara was able to recognize people, although he still could not speak. Later on the same day, Cécé Loua said that he had spoken to Camara and that Camara had responded; according to Cécé Loua, that demonstrated that "he retains his mental faculties".

In 2018 and 2020, he was Guinea's Ambassador to the United Kingdom.
