= Ghazi Salah al-Din al-Atabani =

Sudanese politician and physician

Ghazi Salahuddin Atabani, also written Ghazi Salah al-Din al-Atabani, بالعربي غازي صلاح الدين العتباني (born 15 November 1951, Omdurman, Sudan) is a prominent politician and physician.

== Personal ==
Atabani is married to Samia Yousif Idris Habbani, the daughter of a renowned tribal chief in Sudan; she is also a medical doctor who held the post of Social Affairs Minister in the Government of Khartoum State.

== Education ==
Atabani graduated in 1978 from the Faculty of Medicine, University of Khartoum with a bachelor's degree in Medicine and Surgery. After a brief period of training as doctor in Sudan, he enrolled for postgraduate training at Surrey University, Guildford, England, and got his PhD in Clinical Biochemistry in 1985. On his return to Sudan he became a lecturer at his alma mater, the Faculty of Medicine, University of Khartoum.

== Career ==
Apart from his professional experience, Atabani is a prominent politician in Sudan. He had started his political career at the medical school. He was twice elected by the Students of Khartoum University to the membership of the Forty-Man Council which is the supreme political body overseeing Khartoum University Students Union. While in the UK, he was elected member of the Sudanese Students Union in the UK and Ireland.

Since 1991, he took up several ministerial jobs, including Minister of State for Foreign Affairs, Minister of Culture and Information, and Minister of Communications. As Adviser to the President of Peace Affairs, he achieved in 2002 his most prominent contribution when he signed the Machakos Protocol with Salva Kiir, the current First Vice President of Sudan and Chairman of the Sudan People's Liberation Movement, which paved the way for the signing of the final Comprehensive Peace Agreement between North and South Sudan in 2005.

Atabani was a key figure in the National Congress Party (NCP). He was elected Secretary-General of the party from 1996 to 1998 and was, three times, a Member of the National Assembly of Sudan for the NCP. Until October 2013, he was an elected member of the Leadership Bureau of the NCP, an Adviser to the President, and the Leader of the NCP Caucus (Majority) in the Parliament.

When South Sudan gained its independence in 2011, the government in Khartoum lost some 70% of its annual revenue from the oil industry, which is located mostly in the South, and by the summer of 2013, the government was forced to make cuts in public spending to accommodate its reduced budget. One initiative was to end the subsidy on fuel supplies, but the means was somewhat clumsy, with a single hike that raised fuel prices by about 60%, but also had a knock-on effect on many other basic commodities, due to increased transport costs.

The result was that the poor took to the streets, in a series of large-scale demonstrations that were also poorly handled by the government, with large numbers of protesters being shot dead by the authorities. Atabani was the lead-signatory among 31 reformers who sent a memorandum to the president, deploring the killings and advising a different response the situation. The government was not appreciative and the NCP members were suspended. In October 2013, the 31 signatories, led by Atabani, announced that they were resigning from the NCP, to found a new party.

Atabani is a recipient of the Order of the Republic and of the Order of Political Accomplishment.
