= Sixty-second session of the United Nations General Assembly =

- 18 September 2007 – 15 September 2008 62nd session 62nd general debate
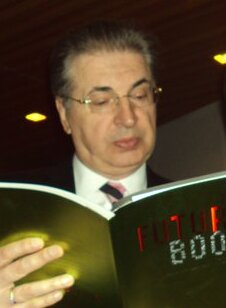
- President of the 62nd General Assembly, Srgjan Kerim
- Host country: United Nations
- Participants: United Nations Member States
- President: Srgjan Kerim
- Secretary-General: Ban Ki-moon

The sixty-second session of the United Nations General Assembly opened on 18 September 2007 at the UN Headquarters in New York. The president was Srgjan Kerim, former Minister of Foreign Affairs of North Macedonia.

The theme of the 62nd session's general debate was "Responding to climate change".

List of UN General Assembly sessions

== See also ==
- List of UN General Assembly sessions
- List of General debates of the United Nations General Assembly
