= Decolonization Is Not a Metaphor =

Paper published in 2012

"Decolonization is Not a Metaphor" is an academic paper published in 2012 by scholars Eve Tuck and K. Wayne Yang. The paper argues that decolonization refers specifically to the return of land to the Indigenous, criticizing the view that decolonization can be used as a broader term for social activism. It is considered influential in the fields of cultural studies and decolonial studies.

== Description ==
In the field of decolonial studies, settler colonialism occurs when a foreign group of people (referred to as "settlers") engage colonial rule over an environment to replace the settlements and society of those who are already there (the Indigenous peoples) with that of the settlers.

The paper begins by defining decolonization as "the repatriation of Indigenous land and life": the physical return of land to the Indigenous. This is contrasted against epistemic decolonization, the notion that knowledge itself is what should be decolonized. "Decolonization Is Not a Metaphor" challenges purely epistemic decolonization as being merely a metaphor because it does not aim to undo the physical and violent conditions of colonialism.

The paper goes on to criticize metaphorical decolonization as a "move to innocence" for settlers that legitimizes their privilege and physical presence on colonized land. The paper uses Occupy Oakland as an example of a movement that obscured this by turning decolonization into a metaphor. Because the Occupy movement calls for a redistribution of land and wealth in equal proportions to all Americans (including settlers), it cannot actually result in decolonization, which requires the land to only be controlled by the Indigenous. Likewise, movements such as Black liberation are also incompatible with decolonization, because Black Americans are still settlers within this framework. This leads to a rejection of reconciliation as being metaphorical.

== Reception and impact ==
Lorenzo Veracini argues that decolonization movements should embrace metaphors that do not obfuscate the meaning of decolonization. He says that colonial movements are inherently metaphorical, and gives the example of describing uncolonized land as "virgin soil", which likens colonization to sexual intercourse to justify the acquisition of that land. In contrast, Veracini uses the example of Aboriginal Australians adopting the "I can't breathe" slogan from the George Floyd protests as an example of how analogies with other anti-racist movements can be used to fight settler colonialism. Tapji Garba and Sara-Maria Sorentino argue that the paper does not adequately differentiate slaves from settlers.

The paper is influential in the field of decolonial scholarship. The paper itself received mainstream attention when used in association with the October 7 attacks on Israel: Andrew Silow-Carroll wrote in a Jewish Telegraph Agency editorial that students using the phrase were "praising the terrorists"; Tyler Austin Harper wrote in an editorial for The Atlantic that the some "elite academics" were enthusiastic about "'decolonization' via terrorism". In an essay for neoconservative magazine The National Interest, Asaf Romirowsky and Alex Joffe lambasted the use of the phrase in reference to October 7, writing, "intellectuals have a deep addiction to terror."
