= Indigenous peoples =

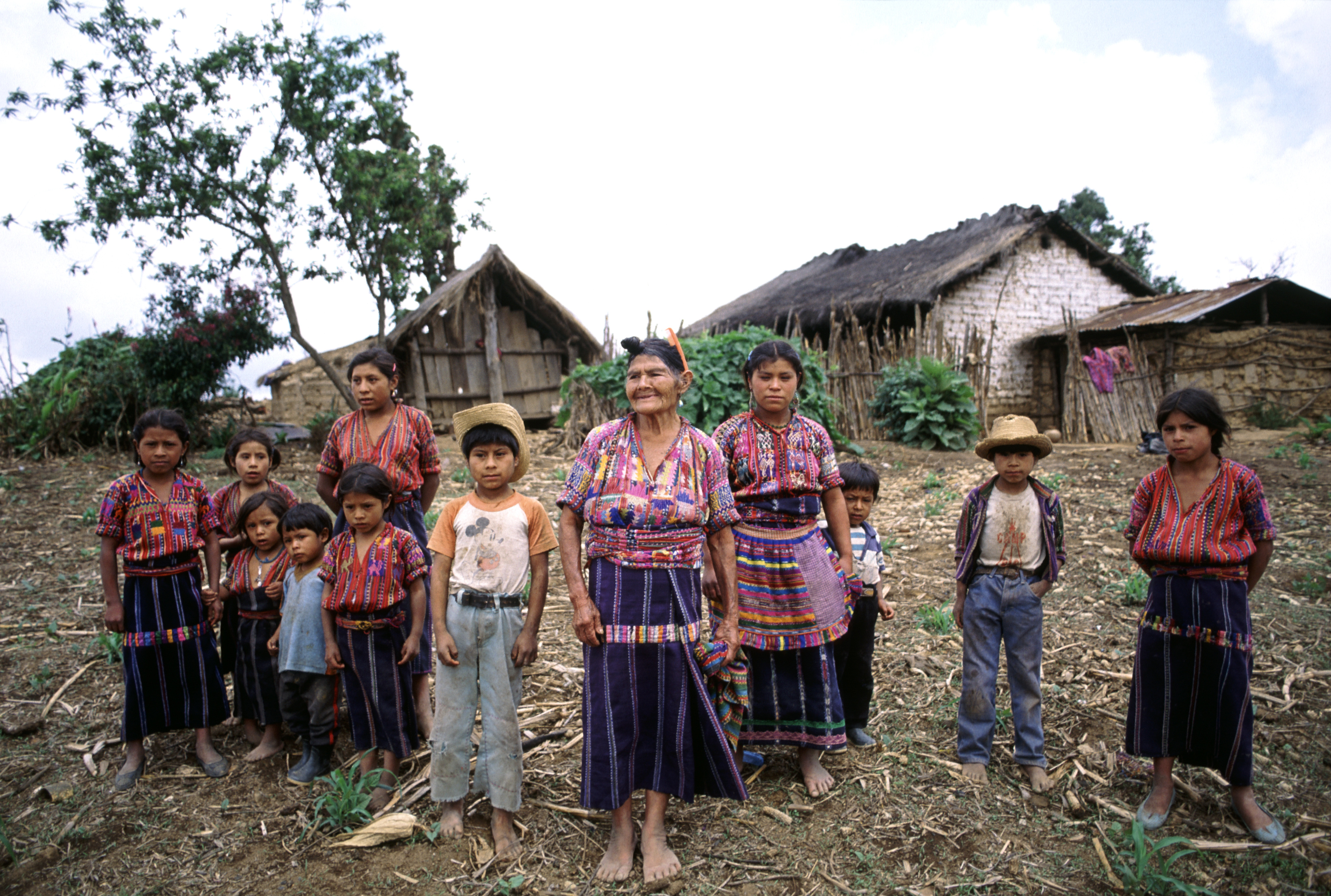
A Kaqchikel family in the hamlet of Patzutzun, Sololá, Guatemala (1993)

Indigenous peoples (Note: Also known as first peoples, first nations, Aboriginal peoples, native peoples, Indigenous natives, or autochthonous peoples. Since 2020, most style guides have recommended capitalization of "Indigenous" when referring to specific Indigenous peoples as ethnic groups, nations, and the citizens or members of these groups.) are characterized by self-identification, cultural difference from other groups in a state, a special relationship with their traditional territory, and an experience of subjugation and discrimination under a dominant cultural model, although there is no generally accepted definition of the concept.

Estimates of the population of Indigenous peoples range from 250 million to 600 million. There are some 5,000 distinct Indigenous peoples spread across every inhabited climate zone and inhabited continent of the world. Most Indigenous peoples are in a minority in the state or traditional territory they inhabit and have experienced domination by other groups, especially non-Indigenous peoples. Although many Indigenous peoples have experienced colonization by settlers from European nations, Indigenous identity is not determined by Western colonization.

The rights of Indigenous peoples are outlined in national legislation, treaties and international law. The 1989 International Labour Organization (ILO) Convention on Indigenous and Tribal Peoples protects Indigenous peoples from discrimination and specifies their rights to development, customary laws, lands, territories and resources, employment, education and health. In 2007, the United Nations (UN) adopted a Declaration on the Rights of Indigenous Peoples including their rights to self-determination and to protect their cultures, identities, languages, ceremonies, and access to employment, health, education and natural resources.

Indigenous peoples continue to face threats to their sovereignty, economic well-being, languages, cultural heritage, and access to the resources on which their cultures depend. In the 21st century, Indigenous groups and advocates for Indigenous peoples have highlighted numerous apparent violations of the rights of Indigenous peoples.

== Etymology ==
Indigenous is derived from the Latin word indigena, meaning "sprung from the land, native". The Latin indigena is based on the Old Latin indu "in, within" + gignere "to beget, produce". Indu is an extended form of the Proto-Indo-European en or "in".

== Definitions ==
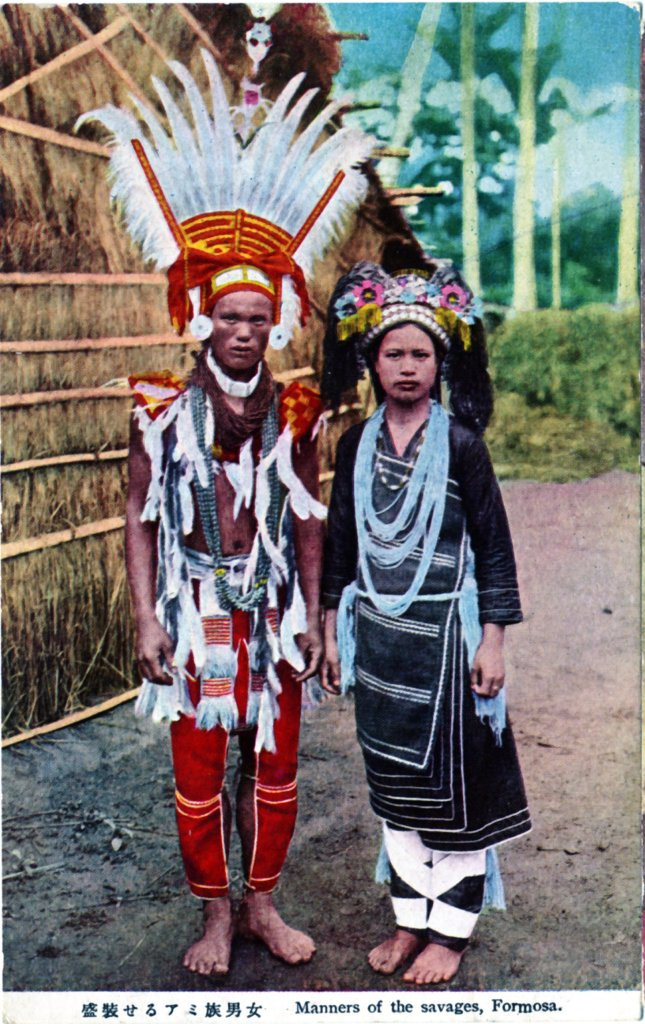
Colorized photograph of an Amis couple in traditional clothing. Taken in pre–World War II Japanese-ruled Taiwan.

There is no generally accepted definition of Indigenous peoples in the United Nations or international law. Various national and international organizations, non-government organizations, governments, Indigenous groups and scholars have developed definitions or have declined to provide a definition.

=== Historical ===
As a reference to a group of people, the term "indigenous" was first used by Europeans to differentiate the Indigenous peoples of the Americas from enslaved Africans. The first known use was by Sir Thomas Browne in 1646, who wrote "and although in many parts thereof there be at present swarms of Negroes serving under the Spaniard, yet were they all transported from Africa, since the discovery of Columbus; and are not indigenous or proper natives of America."

In the 1970s, the term was used as a way of linking the experiences, issues, and struggles of groups of colonized people across international borders. At this time 'indigenous people(s)' also began to be used to describe a legal category in Indigenous law created in international and national legislation. The use of the plural 'peoples' recognizes the cultural differences between various Indigenous peoples.

The first meeting of the United Nations Working Group on Indigenous Populations (WGIP) was on 9 August 1982 and this date is now celebrated as the International Day of the World's Indigenous Peoples.

=== Recent ===
In the 21st century, the concept of Indigenous peoples is understood in a wider context than only the colonial experience. The focus has been on self-identification as indigenous peoples, cultural difference from other groups in a state, a special relationship with their traditional territory, and an experience of subjugation and discrimination under a dominant cultural model.

==== United Nations ====
No definition of Indigenous peoples has been adopted by a United Nations agency. The Secretariat of the Permanent Forum on Indigenous Issues states, "in the case of the concept of 'indigenous peoples', the prevailing view today is that no formal universal definition of the term is necessary, given that a single definition will inevitably be either over- or under-inclusive, making sense in some societies but not in others."

However, a number of UN agencies have provided statements of coverage for particular international agreements concerning Indigenous peoples or "working definitions" for particular reports.

The International Labour Organization's (ILO) Indigenous and Tribal Peoples Convention, 1989 (ILO Convention No. 169), states that the convention covers

peoples in independent countries who are regarded as indigenous on account of their descent from the populations which inhabited the country, or a geographical region to which the country belongs, at the time of conquest or colonisation or the establishment of present state boundaries and who, irrespective of their legal status, retain some or all of their own social, economic, cultural and political institutions.

The convention also covers "tribal peoples" who are distinguished from Indigenous peoples and described as "tribal peoples in independent countries whose social, cultural and economic conditions distinguish them from other sections of the national community and whose status is regulated wholly or partially by their own customs or traditions or by special laws or regulations."

The convention states that self-identification as indigenous or tribal is a fundamental criterion for determining the groups to which the convention applies. The UN Declaration on the Rights of Indigenous Peoples does not define Indigenous peoples but affirms their right to self-determination including determining their own identity.

==== Inter-American Commission on Human Rights ====
The Inter-American Commission on Human Rights does not provide a definition of Indigenous peoples stating that, "such a definition is not necessary for purposes of protecting their human rights." In determining coverage of Indigenous peoples, the commission uses the criteria developed in documents such as ILO Convention No. 169 and the United Nations Declaration on the Rights of Indigenous Peoples. The commission states that self-identification as indigenous is a fundamental criterion.

==== World Bank Group ====
As of September 2026, the World Bank Group does not give a single, concise definition of Indigenous peoples. In 2023, the World Bank described Indigenous Peoples as, "distinct social and cultural groups that share collective ancestral ties to the lands and natural resources where they live, occupy or from which they have been displaced."

The World Bank Environmental and Social Framework (2017) uses the term "Indigenous Peoples/Sub-Saharan African Historically Underserved Traditional Local Communities", while acknowledging that different terms for the same group may be used in different countries. It identifies this group as having the following attributes in varying degrees:

"(a) Self-identification as members of a distinct indigenous social and cultural group and recognition of this identity by others; and

(b) Collective attachment to geographically distinct habitats, ancestral territories, or areas of seasonal use or occupation, as well as to the natural resources in these areas; and

(c) Customary cultural, economic, social, or political institutions that are distinct or separate from those of the mainstream society or culture; and

(d) A distinct language or dialect, often different from the official language or languages of the country or region in which they reside."

==== Amnesty International ====
Amnesty International does not provide a definition of Indigenous peoples but states that they can be identified according to certain characteristics:

- Self identification as Indigenous peoples
- A historical link with those who inhabited a country or region at the time when people of different cultures or ethnic origins arrived
- A strong link to territories and surrounding natural resources
- Distinct social, economic or political systems
- A distinct language, culture and beliefs
- Marginalized and discriminated against by the state
- They maintain and develop their ancestral environments and systems as distinct peoples

==== Scholars ====
Academics and other scholars have developed various definitions of Indigenous peoples. In 1986–87, José Martínez Cobo, the UN Special Rapporteur on the problem of discrimination against indigenous populations, developed the following "working definition":

Indigenous communities, peoples, and nations are those that, having a historical continuity with pre-invasion and pre-colonial societies that developed on their territories, consider themselves distinct from other sectors of the societies now prevailing in those territories, or parts of them. They form at present non-dominant sectors of society and are determined to preserve, develop, and transmit to future generations their ancestral territories, and their ethnic identity, as the basis of their continued existence as peoples, in accordance with their own cultural patterns, social institutions and legal systems.

Martínez Cobo states that the following factors are relevant to historical continuity: occupation of ancestral lands, or at least of part of them; common ancestry with the original occupants of these lands; cultural factors such as religion, tribalism, dress, etc.; language; residence in certain parts of the country, or in certain regions of the world; and other relevant factors.

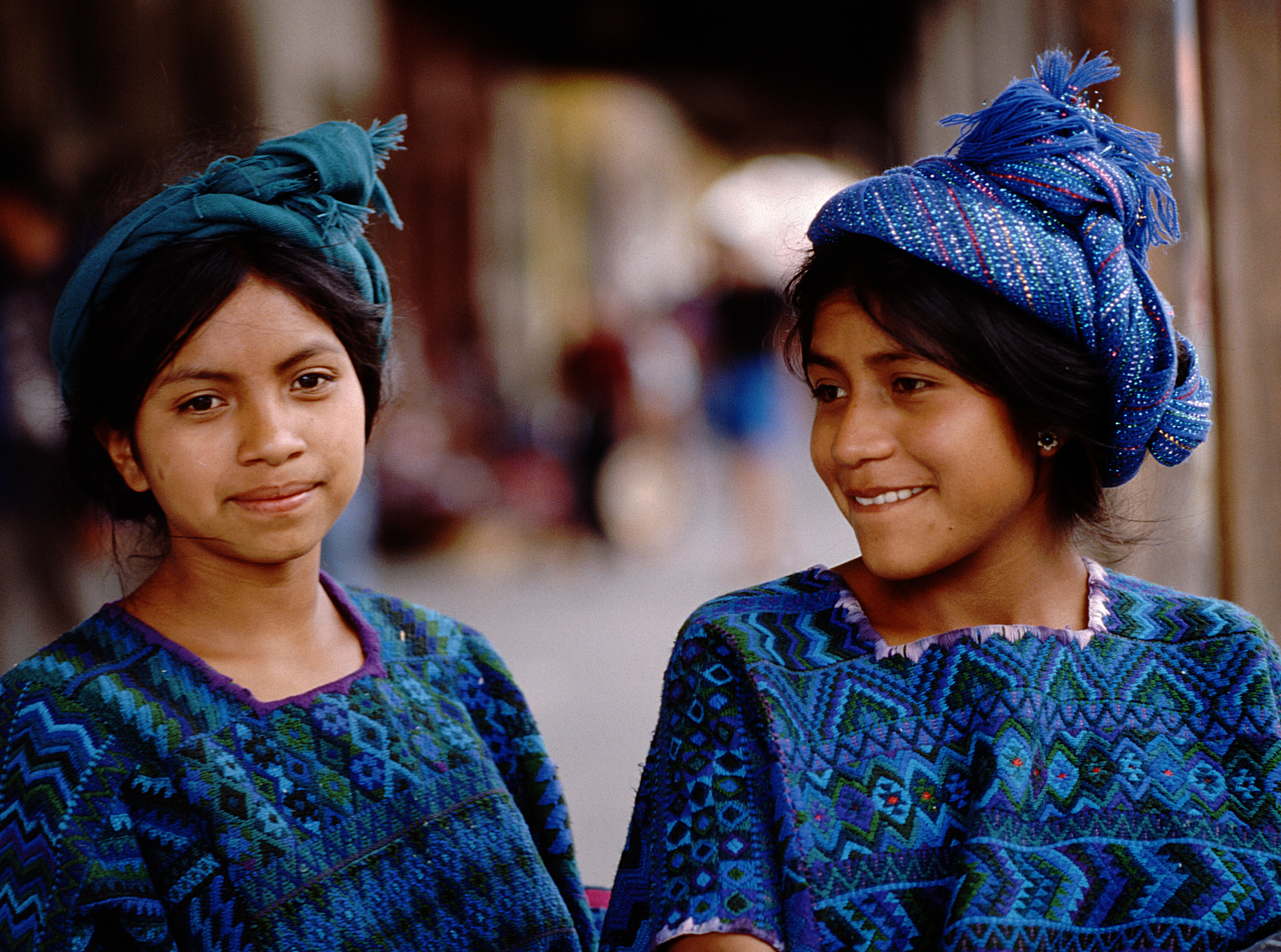
Guatemalan girls in their traditional clothing from the town of Santa Catarina Palopó on Lake Atitlán

In 2004, professor of human rights law and policy James Anaya, defined Indigenous peoples as "living descendants of pre-invasion inhabitants of lands now dominated by others. They are culturally distinct groups that find themselves engulfed by other settler societies born of forces of empire and conquest".

In 2012, Indigenous studies scholars Eve Tuck and K. Wayne Yang proposed a criterion based on accounts of origin: "Indigenous peoples are those who have creation stories, not colonization stories, about how we/they came to be in a particular place – indeed how we/they came to be a place. Our/their relationships to land comprise our/their epistemologies, ontologies, and cosmologies". Indigenous peoples such as the Maasai and the Māori have oral traditional histories involving migration to their current location from somewhere else.

Anthropologist Manvir Singh states that the term may lack coherence, pointing to inconsistencies in which ethnic groups are called Indigenous or not, and notes several scholars who suggest that it instead acts as a relabeling of discredited and colonial ideas about "primitive" people. Singh states that some Indigenous people argue that the term and identity has resulted in pressure to appear "primordial" and "unchanging", and erases complex and modern identities.

Other scholars, such as Dominic O'Sullivan and Marjo Lindroth, have analysed and defined Indigenous peoples as those in a specific power-relationship with the state, called "indigeneity", that has come about due to the process of settler-colonialism.

==== Other views ====
It is sometimes argued that all Africans are Indigenous to Africa, all Asians are Indigenous to parts of Asia, or that there can be no Indigenous peoples in countries which did not experience large-scale Western settler colonialism. Many countries have avoided the term "Indigenous peoples" or have denied that indigenous peoples exist in their territory, and have classified minorities who identify as Indigenous in other ways, such as 'hill tribes' in Thailand, 'scheduled tribes' in India, 'national minorities' in China, 'cultural minorities' in the Philippines, 'isolated and alien peoples' in Indonesia, and various other terms.

== History ==
=== Classical antiquity ===
Greek sources of the Classical period acknowledge Indigenous people whom they referred to as "Pelasgians". Ancient writers saw these people either as the ancestors of the Greeks, or as an earlier group of people who inhabited Greece before the Greeks. The disposition and precise identity of this former group is elusive, and sources such as Homer, Hesiod and Herodotus give varying, partially mythological accounts. Dionysius of Halicarnassus in his book, Roman Antiquities, gives a synoptic interpretation of the Pelasgians based on the sources available to him then, concluding that Pelasgians were Greek.

=== Africa ===
In European late antiquity, many Berbers, Copts and Nubians of north Africa converted to various forms of Christianity under Roman rule, although elements of traditional religious beliefs were retained. Following the Arab invasions of North Africa in the 7th century, many Berbers were enslaved or recruited into the army. The majority of Berbers, however, remained nomadic pastoralists who also engaged in trade as far as sub-Saharan Africa. Coptic Egyptians remained in possession of their lands and many preserved their language and Christian religion. By the 10th century, however, the majority of the population of north Africa spoke Arabic and practiced Islam.

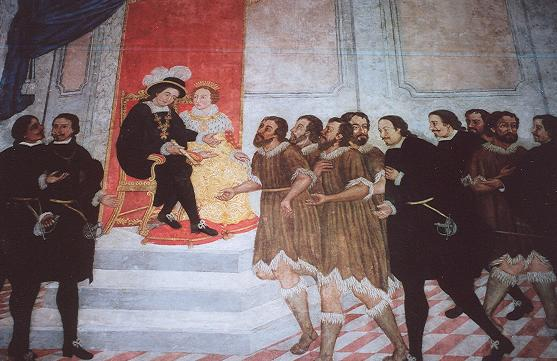
Alonso Fernández de Lugo presenting the captured Guanche kings of Tenerife to Ferdinand and Isabella

From 1402, the Guanche of the Canary Islands resisted Spanish attempts at colonization. The islands finally came under Spanish control in 1496. Mohamed Adhikari has called the conquest of the islands a genocide.

Early 15th-century Portuguese exploration of the west coast of Africa was motivated by a quest for gold and crusading against Islam. Portugal's first attempt at colonization in what is now Senegal ended in failure. In the 1470s, the Portuguese established a fortified trading post on the West coast of Africa, south of the Akan goldfields. The Portuguese engaged in extensive trade of goods for gold and, in later years, slaves for their sugar plantations in the islands off West Africa and in the New World. In 1488, Portuguese ships rounded the Cape of Good Hope and by the 17th century, Portugal had established seaborn trading routes and fortified coastal trading posts from West Africa to India and Southern China, and a settler colony in Brazil.

In 1532, the first African slaves were transported directly to the Americas. The trade in slaves expanded sharply in the 17th century, with the involvement of the French, Dutch and English, before declining in the 19th century. At least 12 million slaves were transported from Africa. The slave trade increased inter-tribal warfare and stunted population growth and economic development in the west African interior.

=== Americas ===
Indigenous encounters with Europeans increased during the age of discovery. The Europeans were motivated by a range of factors including trade, the exploitation of natural resources, spreading Christianity, and establishing strategic military bases, colonies and settlements.

From 1492, the Arawak peoples of the Caribbean islands encountered Spanish colonizers initially led by Christopher Columbus. The Spanish enslaved some of the native population and forced others to work on farms and gold mines in a system of labor called encomienda. Spanish settlements spread from Hispaniola to Puerto Rico, the Bahamas and Cuba, leading to a severe decline in the Indigenous populations from disease, malnutrition, settler violence and cultural disruption.

In the 1520s, the peoples of Mesoamerica encountered the Spanish who entered their lands in search of gold and other resources. Some indigenous peoples chose to ally with the Spanish to end Aztec rule. The Spanish incursions led to the conquest of the Aztec Empire and its fall. The Cempoalans, Tlaxcalans and other allies of the Spanish were given some autonomy, but the Spanish were de facto rulers of Mexico. Smallpox devastated the indigenous population and aided the Spanish conquest.

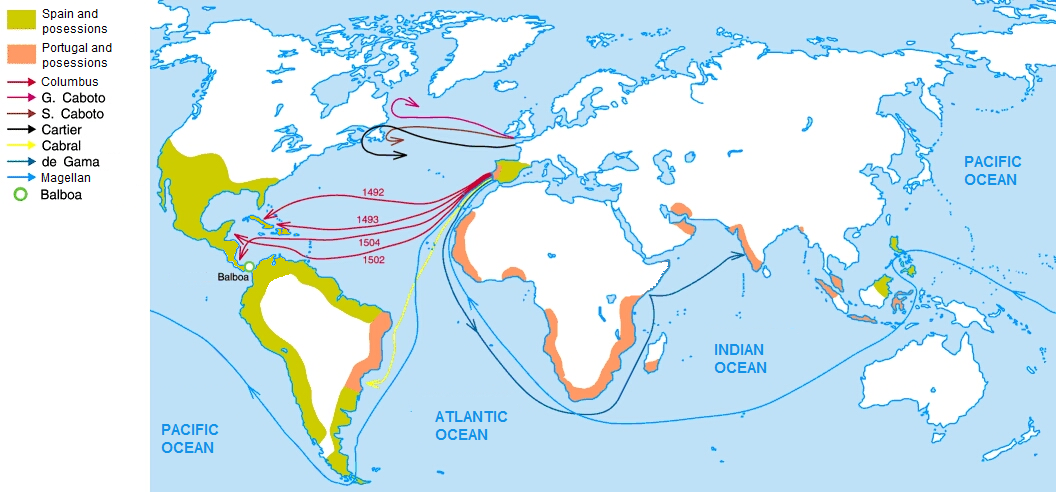
Map with the main travels of the Age of Discovery (which began in the 15th century)

In 1530, the Spanish sailed south from Panama to the lands of the Inca Empire in the west of South America. The Inca, weakened by a smallpox epidemic and civil war, were defeated by the Spanish at Cajamarca in 1532, and the emperor Atahualpa was captured and executed. The Spanish appointed a puppet emperor and captured the Inca capital of Cuzco with the support of a number of native peoples. The Spanish established a new capital in 1535 and defeated an Inca rebellion in 1537, thus consolidating the conquest of Peru.

In the 1560s, the Spanish established colonies in Florida and in 1598 founded a colony in New Mexico. However, the heartland of the Spanish colonies remained New Spain (including Mexico and most of Central America) and Peru (including most of South America).

In the 17th century, French, English and Dutch trading posts multiplied in northern America to exploit whaling, fishing and fur trading. French settlements progressed up the St Lawrence river to the Great Lakes and down the Mississippi to Louisiana. English and Dutch settlements multiplied down the Atlantic coast from modern Massachusetts to Georgia. Native peoples formed alliances with the Europeans in order to promote trade, preserve their autonomy, and gain allies in conflicts with other native peoples. However, horses and new weapons made inter-tribal conflicts more deadly and the native population was devastated by introduced diseases. Native peoples also experienced losses from violent conflict with the colonists and the progressive dispossession of their traditional lands.

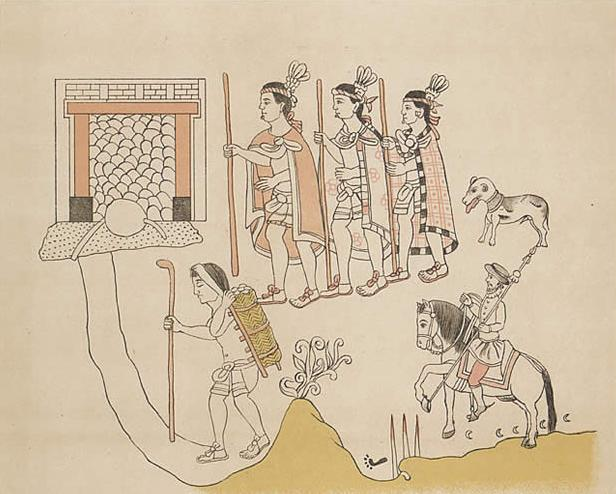
Depiction of a Spaniard entering Chalco with three Tlaxcalan soldiers and an Indigenous porter in the Lienzo de Tlaxcala (pre-1585)

In 1492, the population of the Americas as a whole was about 50 to 100 million. By 1700, introduced diseases had reduced the native population by 90%. European migration and transfer of slaves from Africa reduced the native population to a minority. By 1800 the population of North America comprised about 5 million Europeans and their descendants, one million Africans and 600,000 indigenous Americans.

Native populations also encountered new animals and plants introduced by Europeans. These included pigs, horses, mules, sheep and cattle; wheat, barley, rye, oats, grasses and grapevines. These exotic animals and plants radically transformed the local environment and disrupted traditional agriculture and hunting practices.

=== Oceania ===
The indigenous populations of the Pacific had increasing contact with Europeans in the 18th century as British, French and Spanish expeditions explored the region. The natives of Tahiti had encounters with the expeditions of Wallis (1766), Bougainville (1768), Cook (1769) and many others before being colonized by the French. The indigenous inhabitants of the Hawaiian Islands first encountered Europeans in 1778 when Cook explored the region. Following increasing contact with European missionaries, traders and scientific expeditions, the indigenous population fell before their lands were annexed by the United States in 1893.

The Māori of New Zealand also had sporadic encounters with Europeans in the 17th and 18th centuries. Following encounters with Cook's exploration parties in 1769–70, New Zealand was visited by numerous European and North American whaling, sealing, and trading ships. From the early 19th century, Christian missionaries began to settle New Zealand, eventually converting most of the Māori population. The Māori population declined to around 40% of its pre-contact level during the 19th century; introduced diseases were the major factor. New Zealand became a British Crown colony in 1841.

The Aboriginal inhabitants of Australia, after brief encounters with European explorers in the 17th and 18th centuries, had extensive contact with Europeans when the continent was progressively colonized by the British from 1788. During colonization, the Aboriginal people experienced depopulation from disease and settler violence, dispossession of their land, and severe disruption of their traditional cultures. By 1850, indigenous peoples were a minority in Australia.

=== European justifications for colonization ===
From the 15th to the 19th centuries, European powers used a number of rationales for the colonization of newly encountered lands populated by indigenous peoples. These included a duty to spread the Gospel to non-Christians, to bring civilization to barbarian peoples, a natural law right to explore and trade freely with other peoples, and a right to settle and cultivate uninhabited or uncultivated land which they considered terra nullius ("no one's land").

Robert J. Miller, Jacinta Ruru, Larissa Behrendt and Tracey Lindberg argue that European powers rationalized their colonization of the New World by the discovery doctrine, which they trace back to papal decrees authorizing Spain and Portugal to conquer newly discovered non-Christian lands and convert their populations to Christianity. Kent McNeil, however, states, "While Spain and Portugal favoured discovery and papal grants because it was generally in their interests to do so, France and Britain relied more on symbolic acts, colonial charters, and occupation." Benton and Strauman argue that European powers often adopted multiple, sometimes contradictory, legal rationales for their acquisition of territory as a deliberate strategy in defending their claims against European rivals.

=== Settler independence and continuing colonialism ===
Although the establishment of colonies throughout the world by various European powers aimed to expand those powers' wealth and influence, settler populations in some localities became anxious to assert their own autonomy. For example, settler independence movements in thirteen of the British American colonies were successful by 1783, following the American Revolutionary War. This resulted in the establishment of the United States of America as an entity separate from the British Empire. The United States continued and expanded European colonial doctrine through adopting a version of the discovery doctrine as law in 1823 with the US Supreme Court case Johnson v. McIntosh. Statements at the Johnson court case illuminated the United States' support for the principles of the discovery doctrine:

The United States ... [and] its civilized inhabitants now hold this country. They hold, and assert in themselves, the title by which it was acquired. They maintain, as all others have maintained, that discovery gave an exclusive right to extinguish the Indian title of occupancy, either by purchase or by conquest; and gave also a right to such a degree of sovereignty, as the circumstances of the people would allow them to exercise. ... [This loss of native property and sovereignty rights was justified, the Court said, by] the character and religion of its inhabitants ... the superior genius of Europe ... [and] ample compensation to the [Indians] by bestowing on them civilization and Christianity, in exchange for unlimited independence.

== Population and distribution ==
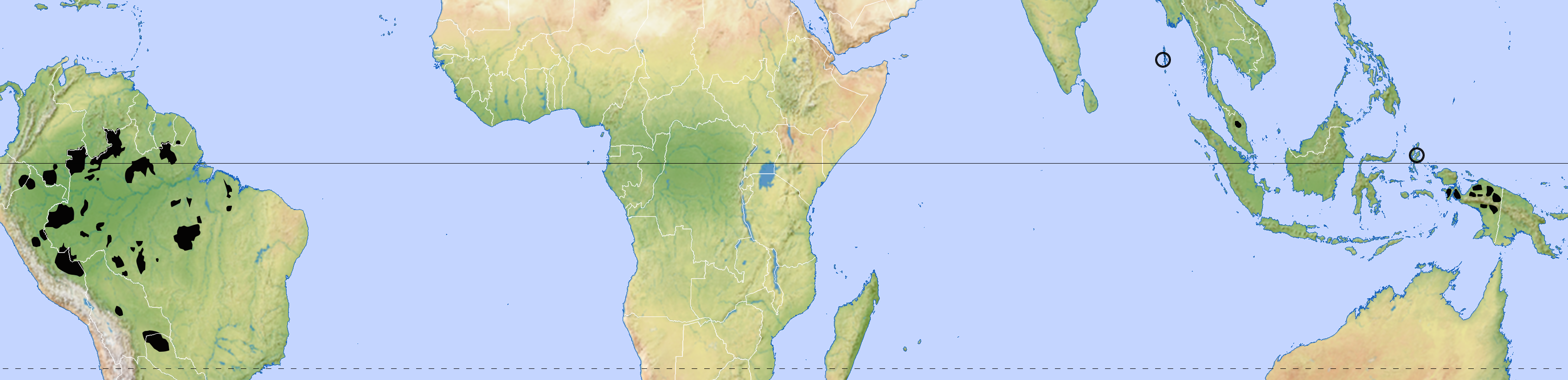
A map of uncontacted peoples, around the start of the 21st century

21st-century estimates of the population of Indigenous peoples range from 250 million to 750 million. In 2007, Mirjan Hirch, a researcher with the Center for World Indigenous Studies, estimated the population at 750 million to a billion, comprising six to seven thousand distinct peoples. The United Nations estimated in 2009 that there were over 370 million Indigenous people living in over 90 countries worldwide, belonging to at least 5,000 distinct peoples. In 2011, the World Bank estimated 300 million Indigenous peoples, including 23 million in Latin America, 106 million in China, 95 million in South Asia, 30 million in Southeast Asia, 22 million in Africa, 15 million in the Arab States and 9 million in the rest of the world. The International Labor Organization in 2019 estimated, based on census data, that there were 476 million Indigenous people in 58 countries. Both the UN and the ILO described their estimates as minimums with the latter calculated using "the most reliable lower bound estimates available."

As there is no universally accepted definition of Indigenous Peoples, their classification as such varies between countries and organizations. In the Americas, Australia and New Zealand, Indigenous status is often applied unproblematically to groups descended from the peoples who lived there prior to European settlement. However, in Asia and Africa, Indigenous status has sometimes been rejected by certain peoples, denied by governments or applied to peoples who may not be considered "Indigenous" in other contexts. The concept of Indigenous peoples is rarely used in Europe, where very few Indigenous groups are recognized, with the exception of groups such as the Sámi.

=== Environmental and economic benefits of the Indigenous stewardship of land ===
A WRI report mentions that "tenure-secure" Indigenous lands generates billions and sometimes trillions of dollars' worth of benefits in the form of carbon sequestration, reduced pollution, clean water and more. It says that tenure-secure Indigenous lands have low deforestation rates, they help to reduce GHG emissions, control erosion and flooding by anchoring soil, and provide a suite of other local, regional and global ecosystem services. However, many of these communities find themselves on the front lines of the deforestation crisis, and their lives and livelihoods threatened.

== Environmental impacts of ancestral and traditional cultures ==
Misconceptions about the historical relationship between Indigenous populations and their landbase has informed some Westerners view of California's "wild Eden", which may influence policy decisions about the "wilderness". Some academics assumed that the only pre-Colonial human interactions with nature were as "hunter-gatherers". Others say that the relationship was one of "calculated tempered use of nature as active agents of environmental change and stewardship". They argue that a view of "wilderness" as uninhabited nature has resulted in removal of Indigenous inhabitants to preserve "the wild", and that depriving the land of traditional Indigenous practices such as controlled burns, harvesting, and seed scattering has yielded dense understory shrubbery or tickets of young trees which are inhospitable to life. Recent studies indicate that Indigenous peoples used land sustainably, without causing substantial losses of biodiversity, for thousands of years.

A goal is to ascertain an unbiased view of Indigenous practices of resource management. Historical literature, archaeological findings, ecological field studies, and Native Peoples' cultures show indications that Indigenous land management practices were largely successful in promoting habitat heterogeneity, increasing biodiversity, and maintaining certain vegetation types, sustaining human lives while conserving natural resources.

Recently, it has come to light that the deforestation rate of Indonesian rainforests has been far greater than estimated. Such a rate could not have been the product of globalization as understood before; rather, it seemed that ordinary local people dependent on these forests for their livelihoods are in fact "joining distant corporations in creating uninhabitable landscapes."

In eastern Penan, three categories of misrepresentation are noticeable: The practice of 'molong', which means never taking more than necessary, is a concept of resource management based purely on stewardship. Communities or individuals take ownership of specific trees, maintaining and harvesting from them sustainably over a long period of time. Some feel this practice has been romanticized in environmentalist writings. Landscape features and particularly their names in local languages provided geographical and historical information for Penan people; whereas in environmentalist accounts, it has turned into a spiritual practice where trees and rivers represent forest spirits that are sacred to the Penan people. A typical stereotype of some environmentalists' approach to ecological ethnography is to present Indigenous "knowledge" of nature as "valuable" to the outside world because of its hidden medicinal benefits. In reality, eastern Penan populations do not identify a medicinal stream of "knowledge". These misrepresentations in the "narrative" of Indigeneity and "value" of Indigenous knowledge might have been helpful for Penan's people in their struggle to protect their environment, but it might also have disastrous consequences. What happens if another case did not fit in this romantic narrative, or another Indigenous knowledge did not seem beneficial to the outside world. These people were being uprooted in the first place because their communities did not fit well with the state's system of values.

At the 2024 United Nations Biodiversity Conference (COP16), Nations agreed to a new permanent body for Indigenous peoples, which will allow them to advise and offer their view at biodiversity COPs directly.

== Indigenous peoples by region ==
Indigenous populations are distributed in regions throughout the globe. The numbers, condition and experience of Indigenous groups may vary widely within a given region. A comprehensive survey is further complicated by sometimes contentious membership and identification.

=== Africa ===
==== Sub-Saharan Africa ====
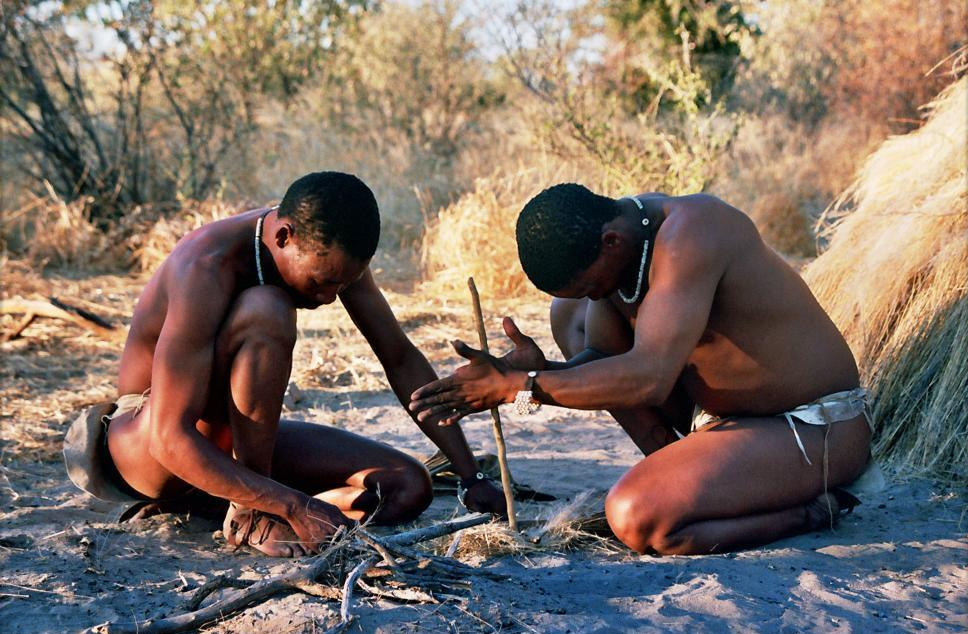
Starting fire by hand, San people in Botswana

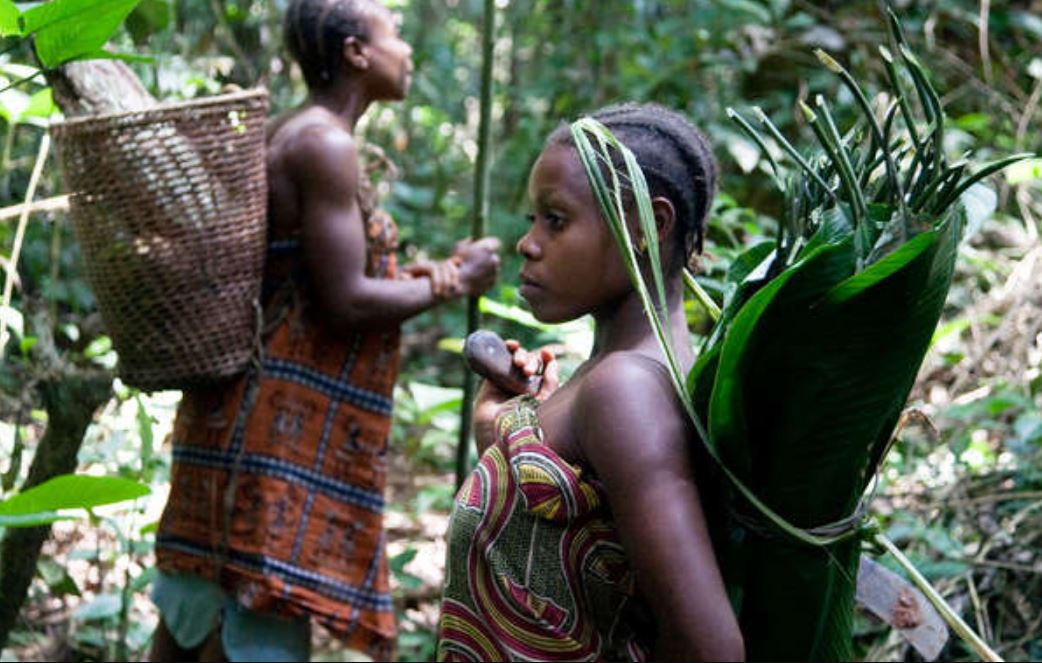
African Pygmies in Congo

In the postcolonial period, the concept of specific Indigenous peoples within the African continent has gained wider acceptance, although not without controversy. The highly diverse and numerous ethnic groups that comprise most modern, independent African states contain within them various peoples whose situation, cultures and pastoralist or hunter-gatherer lifestyles are generally marginalized and set apart from the dominant political and economic structures of the nation. Since the late 20th century these peoples have increasingly sought recognition of their rights as distinct Indigenous peoples, in both national and international contexts.

Though the vast majority of African peoples are indigenous in the sense that they originate from the continent, identity as an Indigenous people via the modern definition of a political indigenous status is more restrictive, and certainly not every African ethnic group claims identification under these terms. Groups and communities who do claim this recognition are those who, by a variety of historical and environmental circumstances, have been placed outside of the dominant state systems, and whose traditional practices and land claims often come into conflict with the objectives and policies implemented by governments, companies and surrounding dominant societies.

==== North Africa ====
The indigenous peoples of North Africa predominantly comprise the Berbers in the Maghreb and the Copts and Nubians in the Nile Valley. The vast majority of them have been Arabized after the Islamic conquests under the Rashidun and Umayyad caliphates.

- Copts are an ethnoreligious group, indigenous to Egypt and parts of the Sudan and Libya, one of the oldest Christian communities in the world.

=== Americas ===
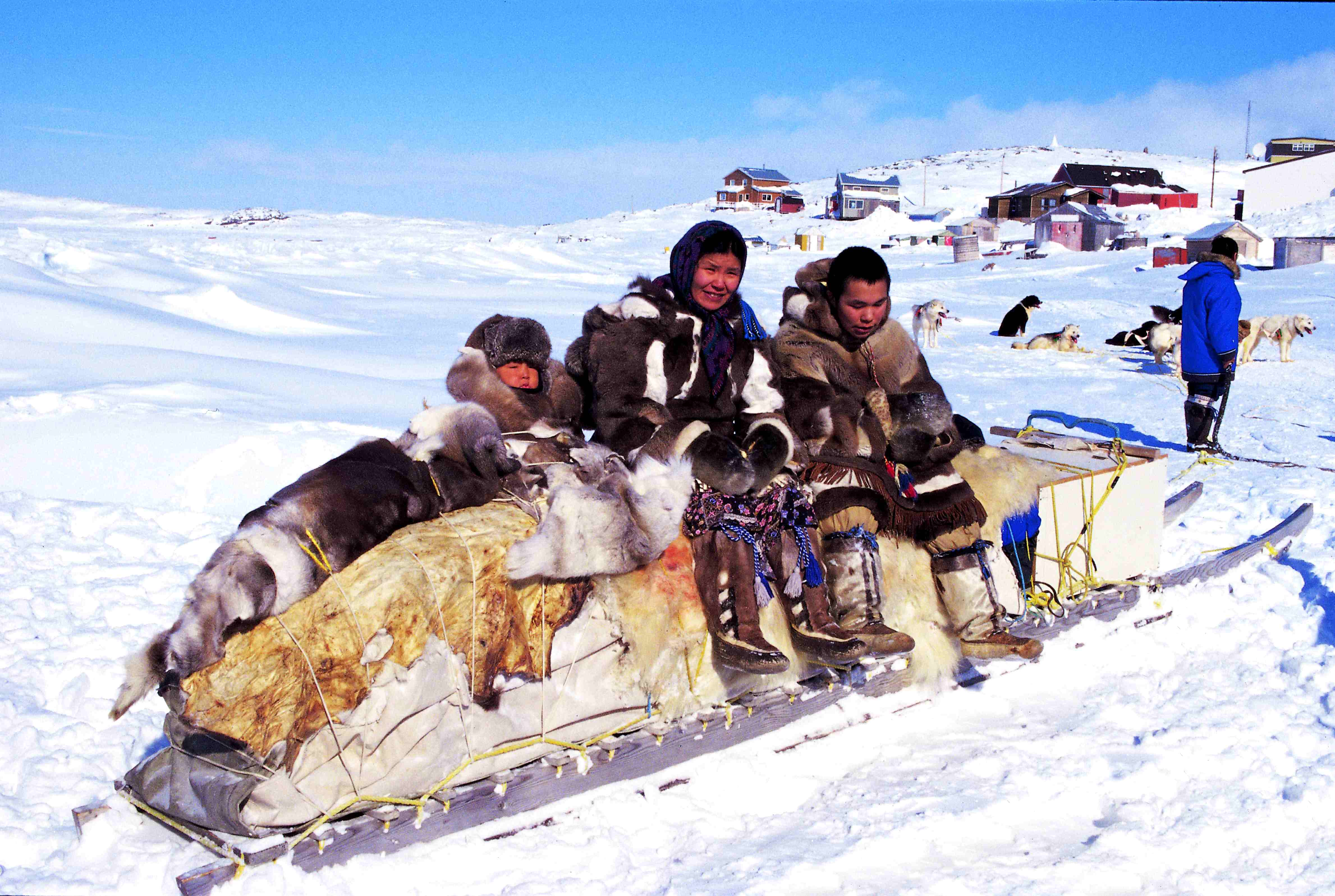
Inuit on a traditional qamutik (dog sled) in Cape Dorset, Nunavut, Canada

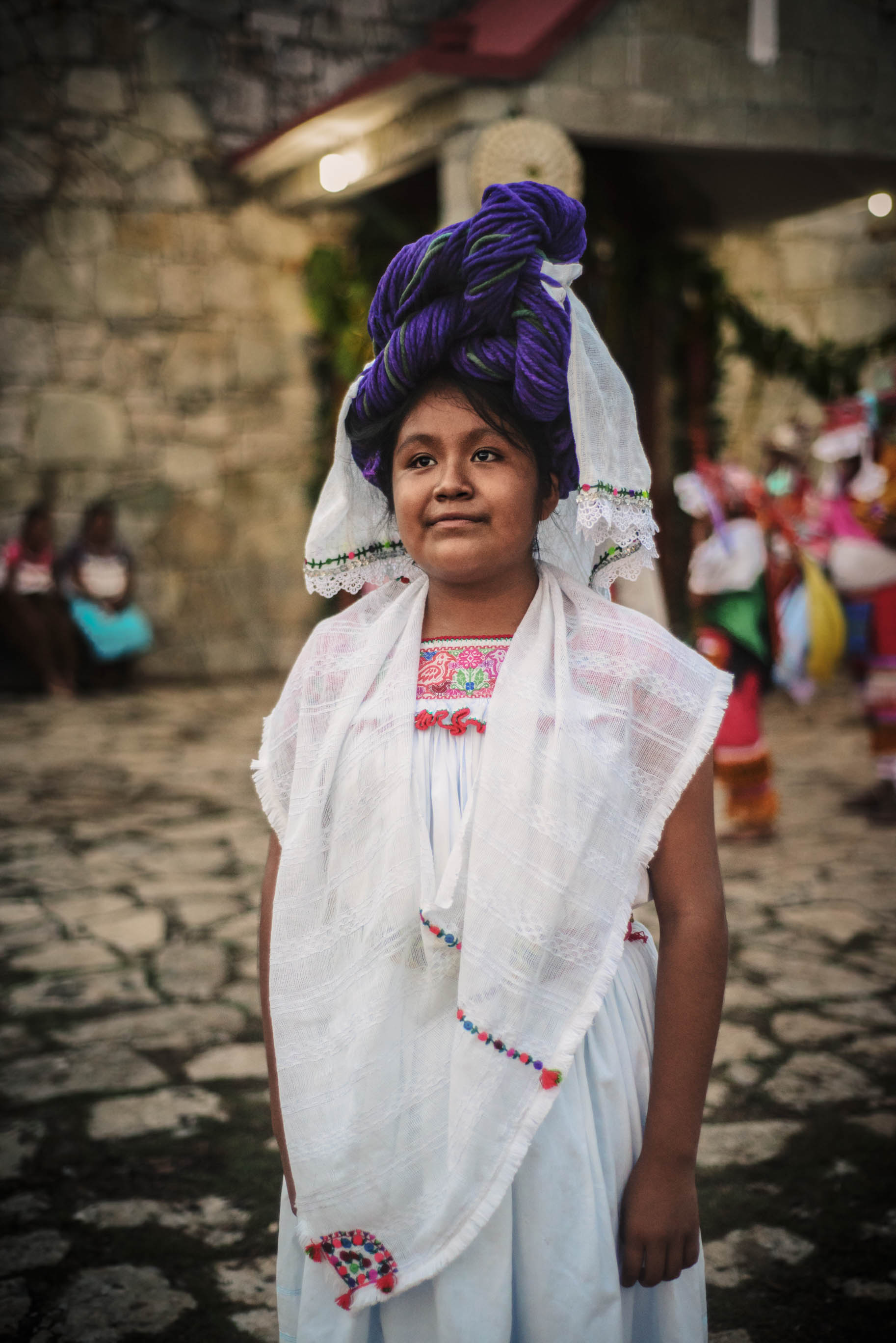
A girl wears the traditional Nahua headdress in Yohualichan, Veracruz.

Indigenous peoples of the Americas are broadly recognized as being those groups and their descendants who inhabited the region before the arrival of European colonizers and settlers (i.e., pre-Columbian). Indigenous peoples who maintain, or seek to maintain, traditional ways of life are found from the high Arctic north to the southern extremities of Tierra del Fuego.

The impacts of historical and ongoing European colonization of the Americas on Indigenous communities have been in general quite severe, with many authorities estimating ranges of significant population decline primarily due to disease, land theft and violence. Several peoples have become extinct, or very nearly so. But there are and have been many thriving and resilient Indigenous nations and communities.

==== North America ====
North America is sometimes referred to by Indigenous peoples as Abya Yala or Turtle Island.

In Mexico, about 11 million people, or 9% of Mexico's total population, self-reported as Indigenous in 2015, making it the country with the highest Indigenous population in North America. In the southern states of Oaxaca (65.73%) and Yucatán (65.40%), the majority of the population is Indigenous, as reported in 2015. Other states with high populations of Indigenous peoples include Campeche (44.54%), Quintana Roo, (44.44%), Hidalgo, (36.21%), Chiapas (36.15%), Puebla (35.28%), and Guerrero (33.92%).

Indigenous peoples in Canada comprise the First Nations, Inuit and Métis. The descriptors "Indian" and "Eskimo" have fallen into disuse in Canada. More currently, the term "Aboriginal" is being replaced with "Indigenous". Several national organizations in Canada changed their names from "Aboriginal" to "Indigenous". Most notable was the change of Aboriginal Affairs and Northern Development Canada (AANDC) to Indigenous and Northern Affairs Canada (INAC) in 2015, which then split into Indigenous Services Canada and Crown-Indigenous Relations and Northern Development Canada in 2017. According to the 2016 Census, there are around 1,670,000 Indigenous people in Canada. There are currently over 600 recognized First Nations governments or bands spread across Canada, such as the Cree, Mohawk, Mikmaq, Blackfoot, Coast Salish, Innu, Dene and more, with distinctive Indigenous cultures, languages, art, and music. First Nations peoples signed 11 numbered treaties across much of what is now known as Canada between 1871 and 1921, except in parts of British Columbia.

The Inuit have achieved a degree of administrative autonomy with the creation in 1999 of the territories of Nunavik (in Northern Quebec), Nunatsiavut (in Northern Labrador) and Nunavut, which was until 1999 a part of the Northwest Territories. The autonomous territory of Greenland within the Kingdom of Denmark is also home to a recognized Indigenous and majority population of Inuit (about 85%) who settled the area in the 13th century, displacing the Indigenous European Greenlandic Norse.

In the United States, the combined populations of Native Americans, Inuit and other Indigenous designations totaled 2,786,652 (constituting about 1.5% of 2003 U.S. census figures). Some 563 scheduled tribes are recognized at the federal level, and a number of others recognized at the state level.

==== Central and South America ====
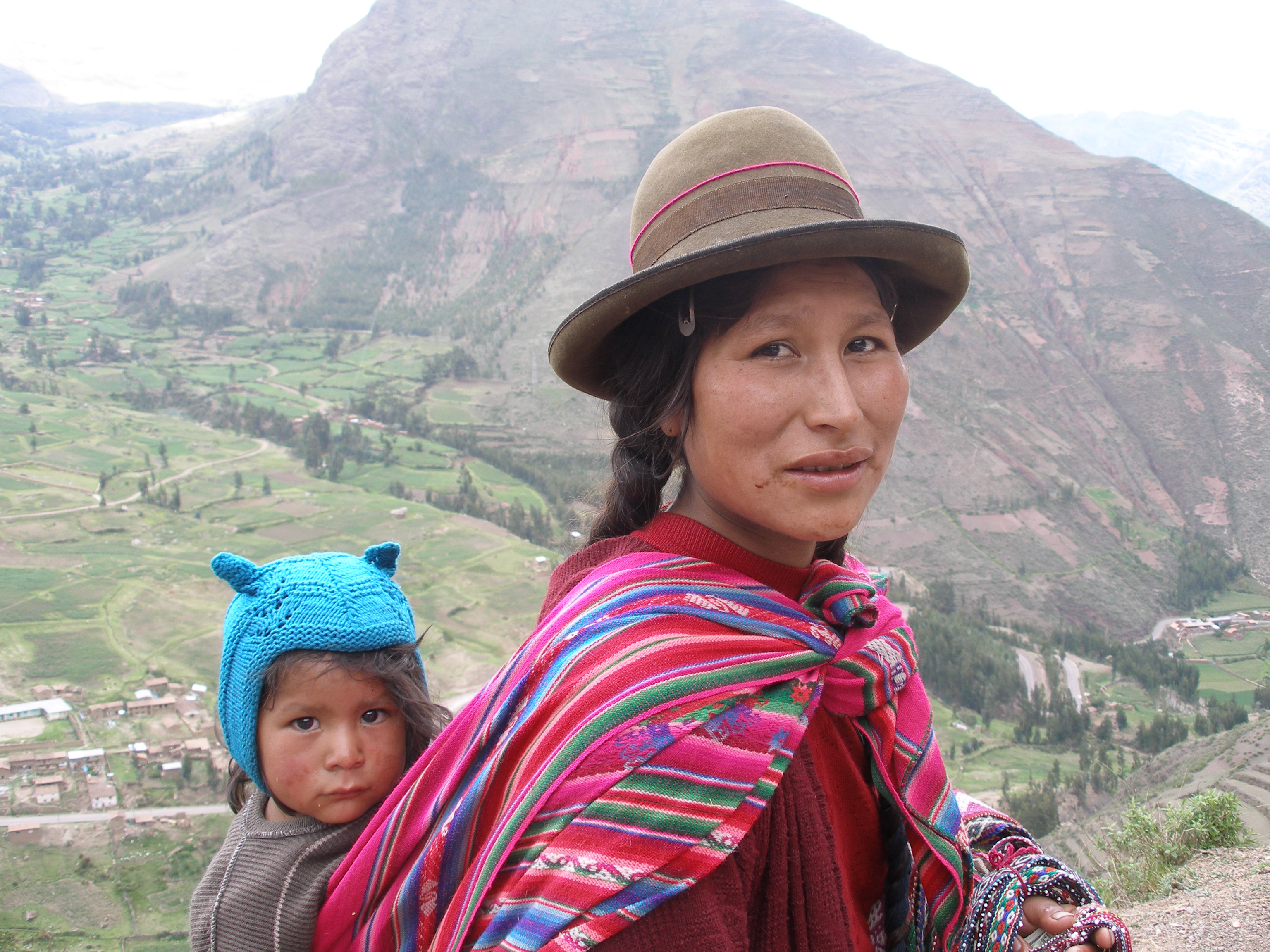
Quechua woman and child in the Sacred Valley, Andes, Peru

In some countries (particularly in Latin America), Indigenous peoples form a sizable component of the overall national population – in Bolivia, they account for an estimated 56–70% of the total nation, and at least half of the population in Guatemala and the Andean and Amazonian nations of Peru. In English, Indigenous peoples are collectively referred to by different names that vary by region, age and ethnicity of speakers, with no one term being universally accepted. While still in use in-group, and in many names of organizations, "Indian" is less popular among younger people, who tend to prefer "Indigenous" or simply "Native", with most preferring to use the specific name of their tribe or Nation instead of generalities. In Spanish or Portuguese speaking countries, one finds the use of terms such as índios, pueblos indígenas, amerindios, povos nativos, povos indígenas, and, in Peru, Comunidades Nativas (Native Communities), particularly among Amazonian societies like the Urarina and Matsés. In Chile, there the most populous indigenous peoples are the Mapuche in the Center-South and the Aymaras in the North. Rapa Nui of Easter Island, who are a Polynesian people, are the only non-Amerindian indigenous people in Chile.

Indigenous peoples make up 0.4% of all Brazilian population, or about 700,000 people. Indigenous peoples are found in the entire territory of Brazil, although the majority of them live in Indian reservations in the North and Center-Western part of the country. On 18 January 2007, FUNAI reported that it had confirmed the presence of 67 different uncontacted peoples in Brazil, up from 40 in 2005. With this addition Brazil has now overtaken the island of New Guinea as the country having the largest number of uncontacted peoples.

=== Asia ===
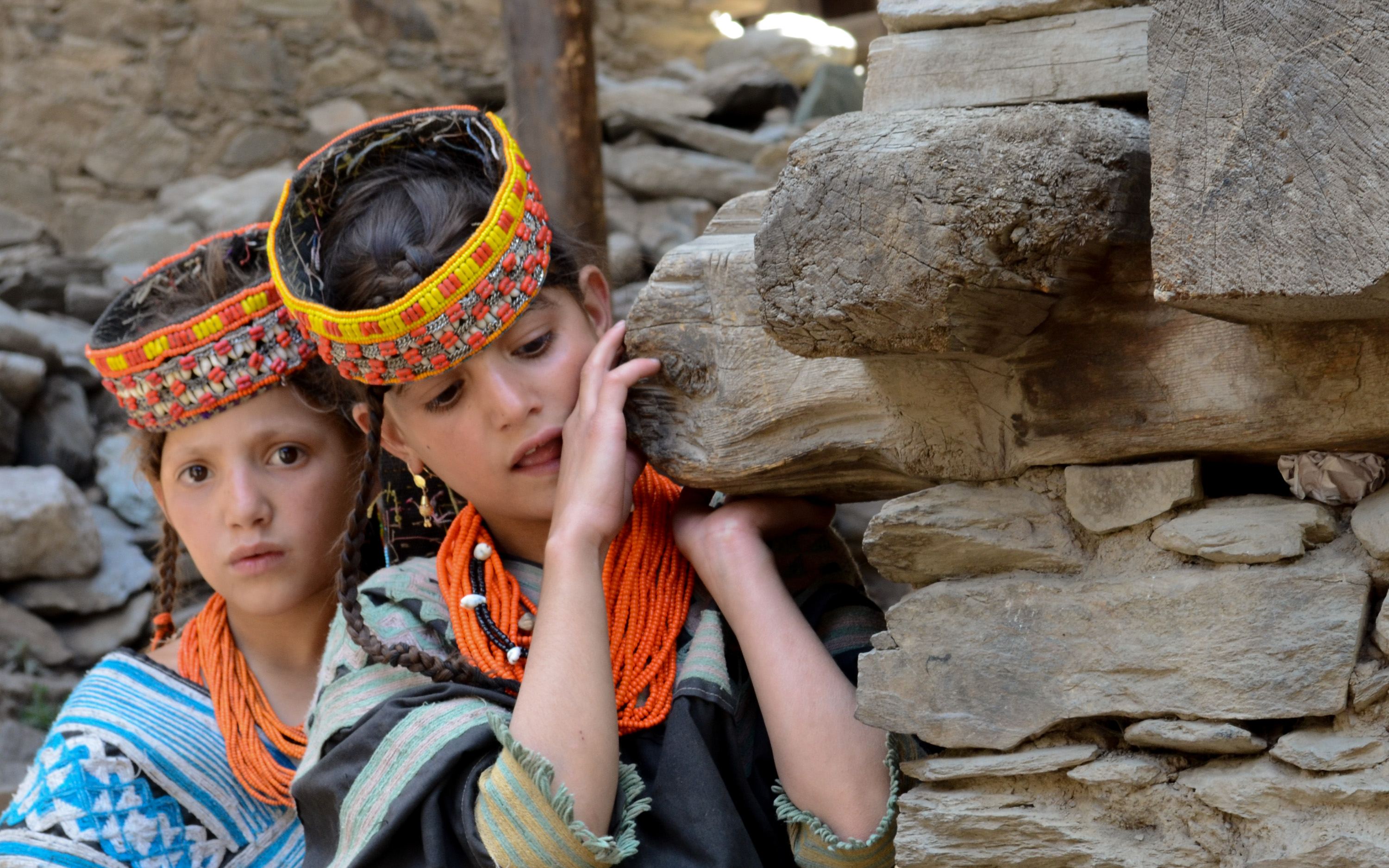
Kalash girls in Pakistan

==== West Asia ====
- Armenians are the Indigenous people of the Armenian Highlands. There are currently more Armenians living outside their ancestral homeland because of the Armenian genocide of 1915.
- Anatolian Greeks, including the Pontic Greeks and Cappadocian Greeks, are the Greek-speaking minorities that existed in Anatolia millennia before Turkic conquest. They are indigenous to Asiatic Turkey. Most were either killed in the Greek genocide or displaced during the following population exchange; however, some remain in Turkey. There has been a Greek presence in Anatolia since at least the 1000s BCE, and Greek traders visited western Anatolia beginning in 1900 BCE.
- Assyrians are indigenous to Mesopotamia. They claim descent from the ancient Neo-Assyrian Empire, and lived in what was Assyria, their original homeland, and still speak dialects of Aramaic, the official language of the Assyrian Empire.
- Kurds are one of the Indigenous peoples of Mesopotamia.
- Yazidis are indigenous to Upper Mesopotamia.

Due to changes in the demographic history of Palestine, there are competing claims that Jews and Palestinian Arabs are indigenous to the region (see Indigeneity in the Israeli–Palestinian conflict). The argument entered the Israeli–Palestinian conflict, with Jews claiming indigeneity, citing historical and religious connections to the land as their ancient homeland. Palestinians claim Indigenous status as a pre-existing population displaced by Jewish settlement, and currently constituting a minority in the State of Israel. In 2007, the Negev Bedouin were officially recognized as Indigenous peoples of Israel by the United Nations. This has been criticized both by scholars associated with the Israeli state, who dispute the Bedouin's claim to indigeneity, and those who argue that recognizing just one group of Palestinians as indigenous risks undermining others' claims and "fetishizing" nomadic cultures.

==== South Asia ====
India's Andaman and Nicobar Islands in the Indian Ocean are also home to several Indigenous groups such as the Andamanese of Strait Island, the Jarawas of Middle Andaman and South Andaman Islands, the Onge of Little Andaman Island and the uncontacted Sentinelese of North Sentinel Island.

In Sri Lanka, the Indigenous Vedda people constitute a small minority of the population today.

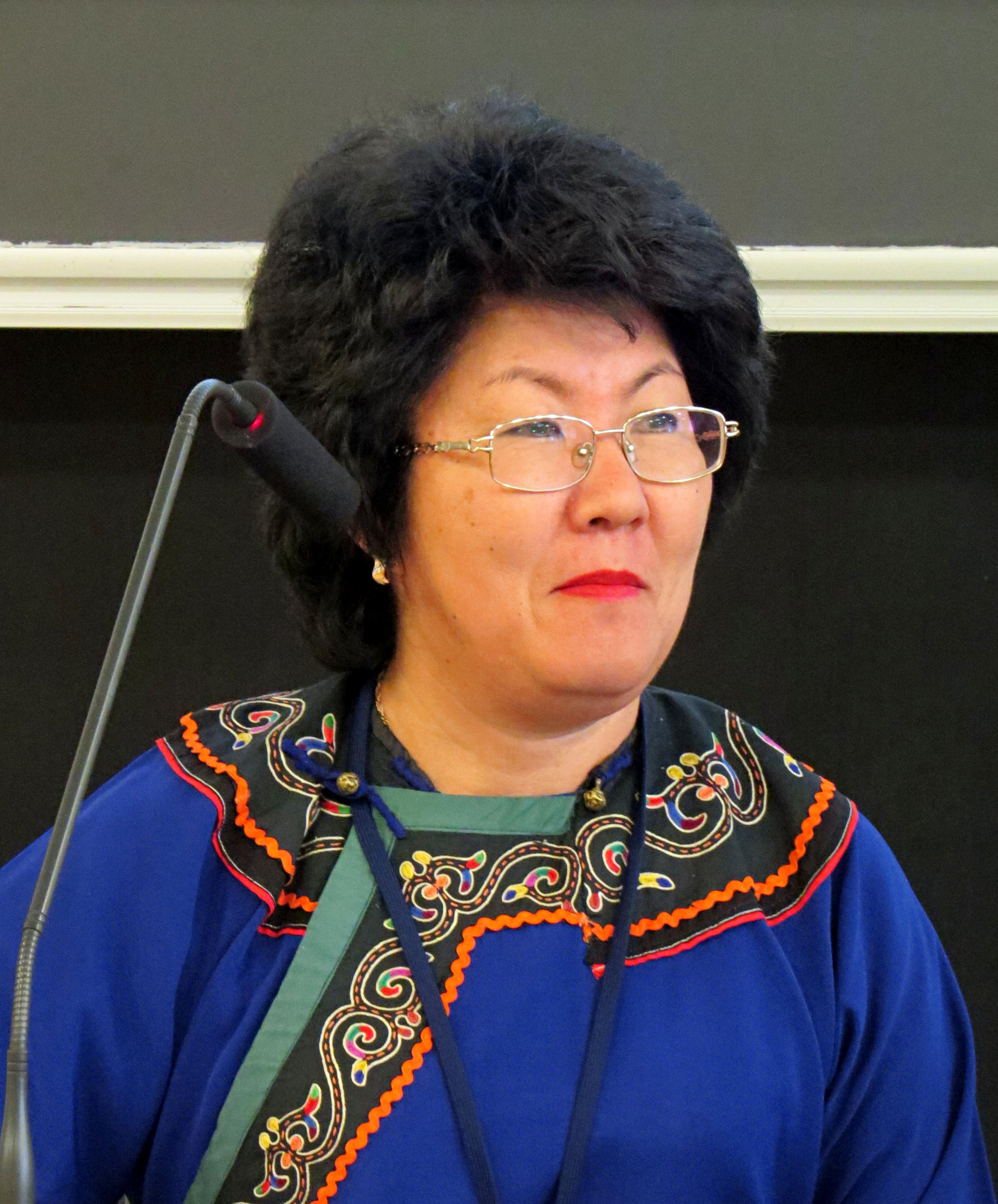
Marina Temina, a native speaker and teacher of the Nivkh language

==== Northeast Asia ====
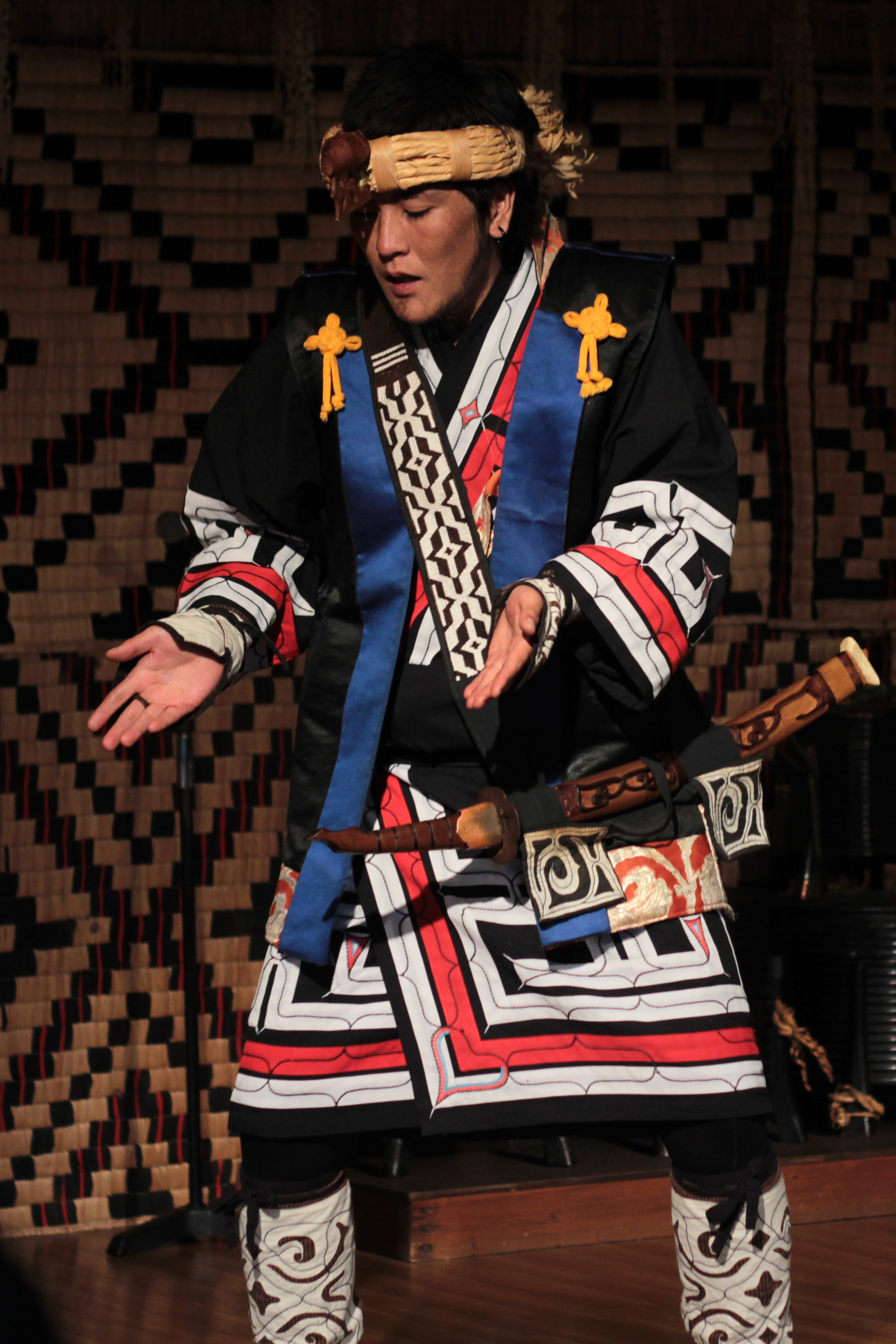
Ainu man performing a traditional Ainu dance

Ainu people are an ethnic group indigenous to Hokkaido, the Kuril Islands, and much of Sakhalin. As Japanese settlement expanded, the Ainu were pushed northward and fought against the Japanese in Shakushain's Revolt and Menashi–Kunashir Rebellion, until by the Meiji period they were confined by the government to a reservation near Lake Akan in Hokkaido. In a ground-breaking 1997 decision involving the Ainu people of Japan, the Japanese courts recognized their claim in law, stating that "If one minority group lived in an area prior to being ruled over by a majority group and preserved its distinct ethnic culture even after being ruled over by the majority group, while another came to live in an area ruled over by a majority after consenting to the majority rule, it must be recognized that it is only natural that the distinct ethnic culture of the former group requires greater consideration."

The Dzungar Oirats are indigenous to the Dzungaria in Northern Xinjiang.

The Sarikoli Pamiris are indigenous to Tashkurgan in Xinjiang.

The Tibetans are indigenous to Tibet.

The Ryukyuan people are indigenous to the Ryukyu Islands.

The languages of Taiwanese aborigines have significance in historical linguistics, since in all likelihood Taiwan was the place of origin of the entire Austronesian language family, which spread across Oceania.

In Hong Kong, the indigenous inhabitants of the New Territories are defined in the Sino-British Joint Declaration as people descended through the male line from a person who was in 1898, before Convention for the Extension of Hong Kong Territory. There are several different groups that make up the indigenous inhabitants, the Punti, Hakka, Hoklo, and Tanka. All are nonetheless considered part of the Cantonese majority, although some like the Tanka have been shown to have genetic and anthropological roots in the Baiyue people, the pre-Han Chinese inhabitants of Southern China.

The Russians invaded Siberia and conquered the indigenous people in the 17th–18th centuries.

Nivkh people are an ethnic group indigenous to Sakhalin, having a few speakers of the Nivkh language, but their fisher culture has been endangered due to the development of oil field of Sakhalin from 1990s.

In Russia, definition of "Indigenous peoples" is contested largely referring to a number of population (less than 50,000 people), and neglecting self-identification, origin from indigenous populations who inhabited the country or region upon invasion, colonization or establishment of state frontiers, distinctive social, economic and cultural institutions. Thus, indigenous peoples of Russia such as Sakha, Komi and others are not considered as such due to the size of the population (more than 50,000 people), and consequently they "are not the subjects of the specific legal protections." The Russian government recognizes only 40 ethnic groups as indigenous peoples, even though there are 30 other groups to be counted as such. The reason of nonrecognition is the size of the population and relatively late advent to their current regions, thus indigenous peoples in Russia should be numbered less than 50,000 people.

==== Southeast Asia ====
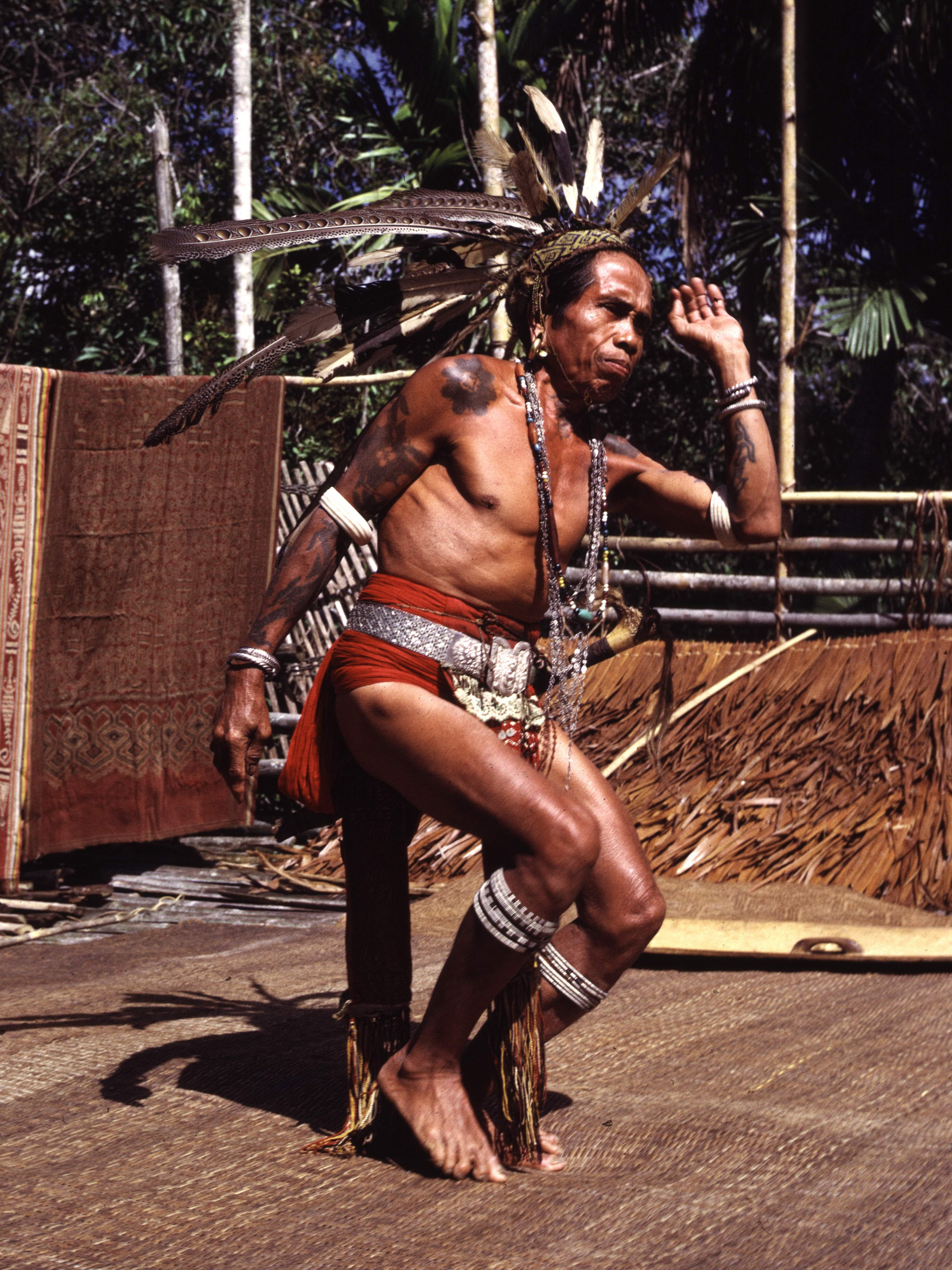
Dayak people in Borneo

The Malay Singaporeans are the Indigenous people of Singapore, inhabiting it since the Austronesian migration. They had established the Kingdom of Singapura back in the 13th century. The name "Singapore" is an anglicisation of the Malay name Singapura which is derived from the Sanskrit word for 'lion city'. The native Malay name for the main island of Singapore is Pulau Ujong.

Dayak People are one of the Indigenous groups of Borneo. It is a loose term for over 200 riverine and hill-dwelling ethnic groups, located in Borneo, each with its own dialect, customs, laws, territory, and culture, although common distinguishing traits are readily identifiable.

The Cham are the Indigenous people of the former state of Champa which was conquered by Vietnam in the Cham–Vietnamese wars during Nam tiến. The Cham in Vietnam are only recognized as a minority, and not as an Indigenous people by the Vietnamese government despite being indigenous to the region.

The Degar (Montagnards) are indigenous to Central Highlands (Vietnam) and were conquered by the Vietnamese in the Nam tiến.

The Khmer Krom are the Indigenous people of the Mekong Delta and Saigon which were acquired by Vietnam from Cambodian King Chey Chettha II in exchange for a Vietnamese princess.

In Indonesia, there are 50 to 70 million people who are classified as Indigenous peoples by the local Indigenous rights advocacy group Aliansi Masyarakat Adat Nusantara. However, the Indonesian government does not recognize the existence of indigenous peoples, classifying every Native Indonesian ethnic group as "indigenous" despite the clear cultural distinctions of certain groups. This problem is shared by many other countries in the ASEAN region.

In the Philippines, there are 135 ethno-linguistic groups, 110 of which are considered as Indigenous peoples by the National Commission on Indigenous Peoples. The Indigenous people of Cordillera Administrative Region and Cagayan Valley in the Philippines are the Igorot people. The Indigenous peoples of Mindanao are the Lumad peoples and the Moro (Tausug, Maguindanao Maranao and others) who also live in the Sulu archipelago. There are also others sets of Indigenous peoples in Palawan, Mindoro, Visayas, and the rest central and south Luzon. The country has one of the largest Indigenous peoples population in the world. The recognition of the rights of Indigenous peoples was legally enshrined in 1997 with the Indigenous Peoples' Rights Act.

In Myanmar, indigenous peoples include the Shan, the Karen, the Rakhine, the Karenni, the Chin, the Kachin and the Mon. However, there are more ethnic groups that are considered indigenous, for example, the Akha, the Lisu, the Lahu or the Mru, among others.

=== Europe ===
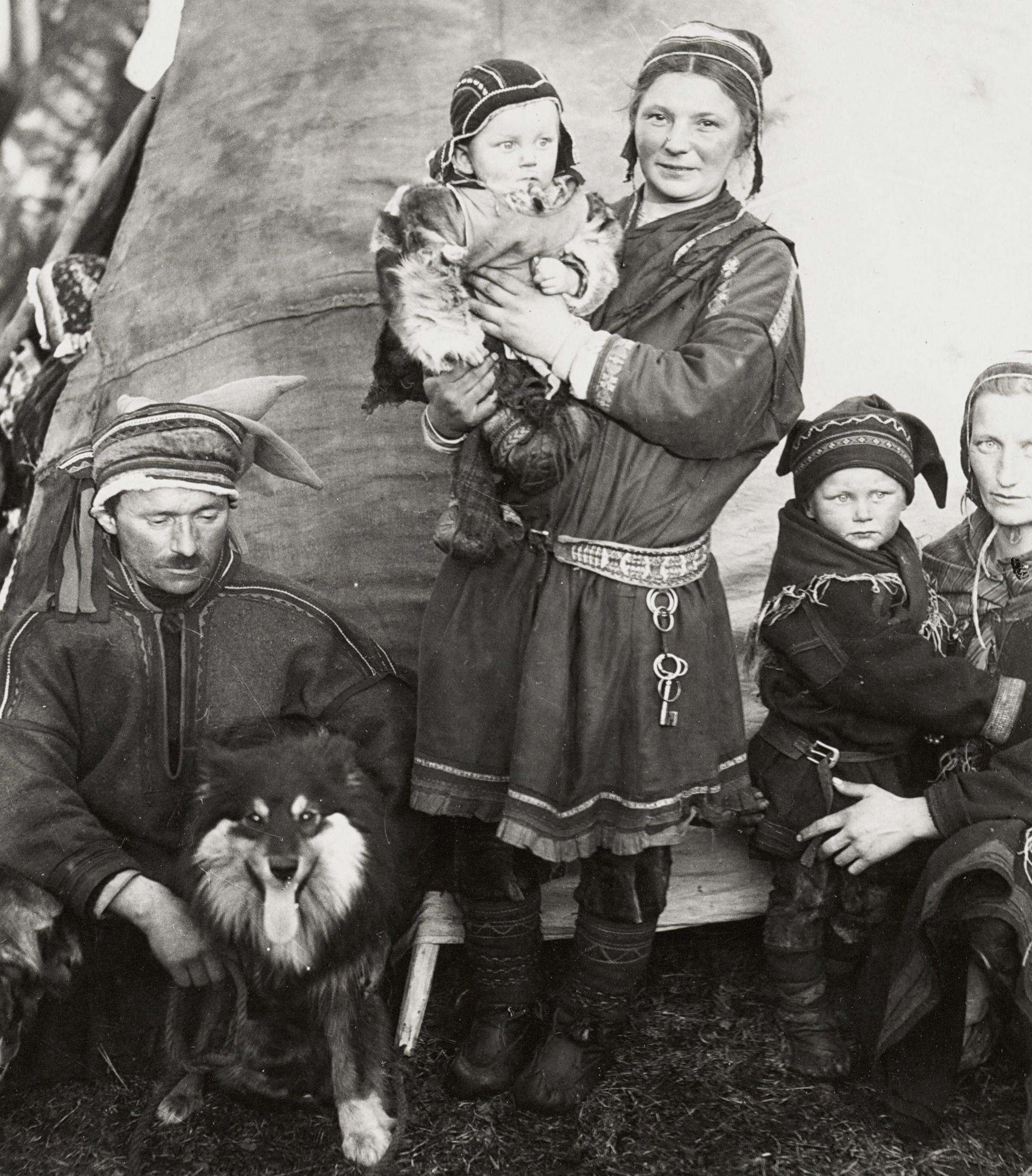
Sámi family in Lapland, 1936

Various ethnic groups have lived in Europe for millennia. However, the concept of Indigenous peoples is rarely used in the European context.

Indigenous minority populations in Europe include the Sámi peoples of northern Norway, Sweden, and Finland and northwestern Russia (in an area also referred to as Sápmi); the Nenets of northern Russia, the Basques of Spain and France, the Inuit of Greenland, and the Irish travelers (also referred to as Pavees or Mincérs) of Ireland. (Note: "Irish Travellers are a minority community indigenous to Ireland who have existed on the margins of Irish society for centuries. They share common cultural practices, such as nomadism, early marriage, and a tradition of self-employment. They have distinct rituals of death and cleansing, and their own language, Gammon or Cant." (Keane 43)) Some sources describe the Sámi as the only recognized Indigenous peoples in Europe, with others describing them as the only Indigenous people in the European Union.

Other groups, particularly in Central, Western and Southern Europe, that might be considered to fit the description of Indigenous peoples in the Indigenous and Tribal Peoples Convention, 1989, such as the Sorbs, are generally categorized as national minorities instead.

=== Oceania ===
==== Australia ====
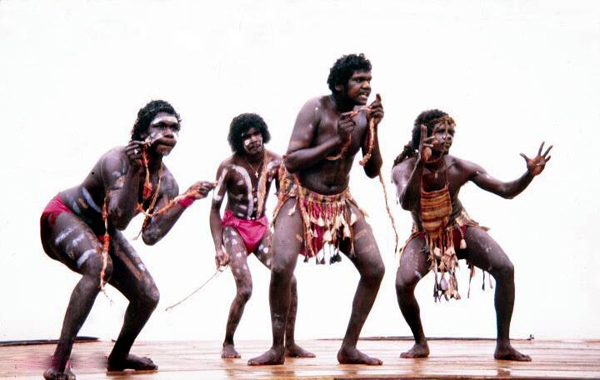
Aboriginal Australian dancers

In Australia, the Indigenous populations are the Aboriginal Australian peoples (comprising many different nations and language groups) and the Torres Strait Islander peoples (also with sub-groups). These two groups are often referred to as Indigenous Australians, although terms such as First Nations and First Peoples are also used.

==== Pacific Islands ====
Polynesian, Melanesian and Micronesian peoples originally populated many of the present-day Pacific Island countries in the Oceania region over the course of thousands of years. European, American, Chilean and Japanese colonial expansion in the Pacific brought many of these areas under non-Indigenous administration, mainly during the 19th century. During the 20th century, several of these former colonies gained independence and nation-states formed under local control. However, various peoples have put forward claims for Indigenous recognition where their islands are still under external administration; examples include the Chamorros of Guam and the Northern Marianas, and the Marshallese of the Marshall Islands. Some islands remain under administration from Paris, Washington, London or Wellington.

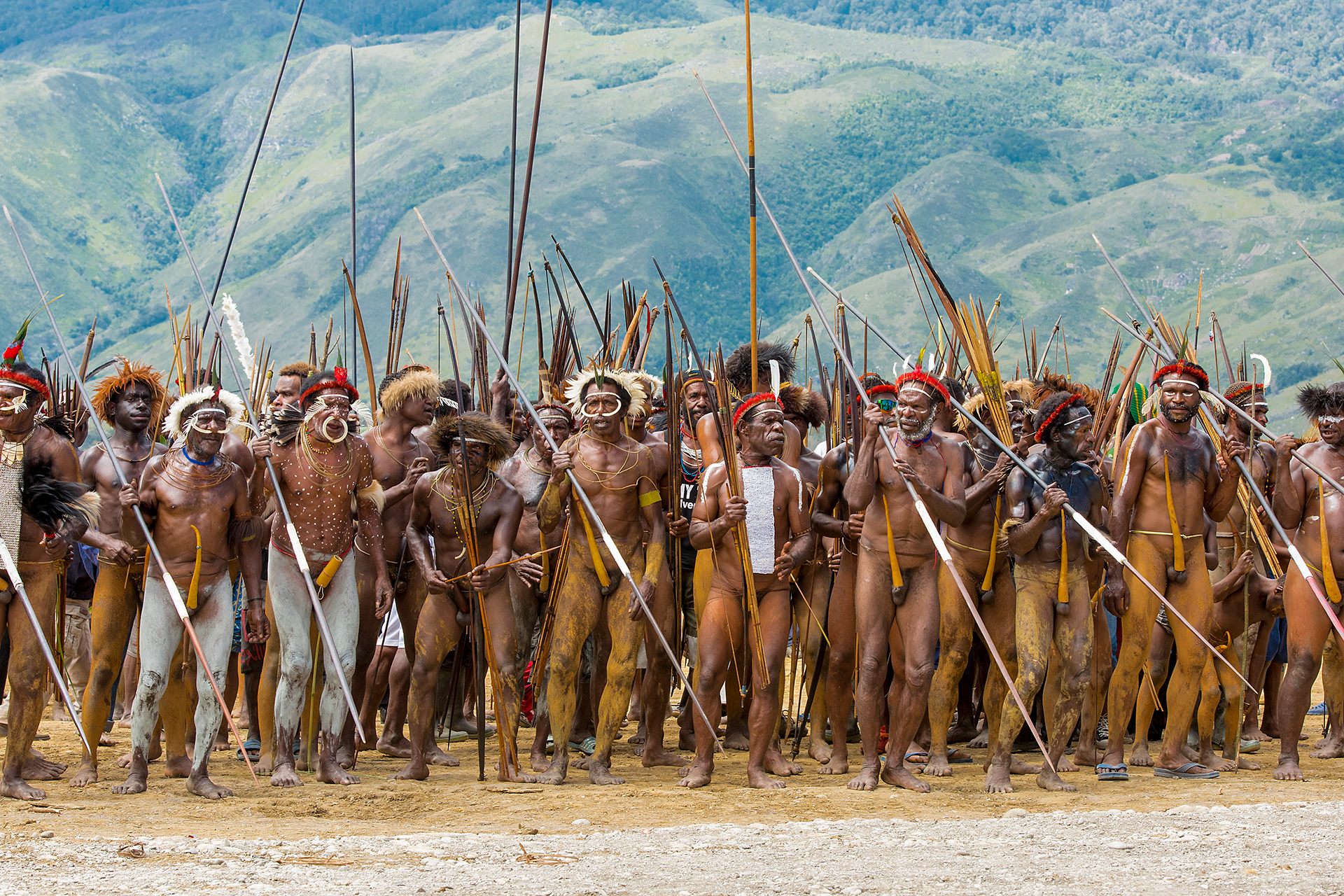
Dani people from the central highlands of western New Guinea

The remains of at least 25 miniature humans, who lived between 1,000 and 3,000 years ago, were recently found on the islands of Palau in Micronesia.

In most parts of Oceania, Indigenous peoples outnumber the descendants of colonists. Exceptions include Australia, New Zealand and Hawaii. In New Zealand, based on various factors including census data and self-identification, the proportion of full or part Māori of the population on 30 June 2021 was estimated to be 17%. Māori developed from Polynesian people who settled in New Zealand after migrations from other Pacific islands, probably in the 13th century. Many leaders of Māori nations (iwi) signed a written agreement with the British Crown in 1840, known as the Treaty of Waitangi.

A majority of the Papua New Guinea population is Indigenous, with more than 700 different nationalities recognized in a total population of 8 million. The country's constitution and key statutes identify traditional or custom-based practices and land tenure, and explicitly set out to promote the viability of these traditional societies within the modern state. However, conflicts and disputes concerning land use and resource rights continue between indigenous groups, the government, and corporate entities.

== Indigenous rights and other issues ==
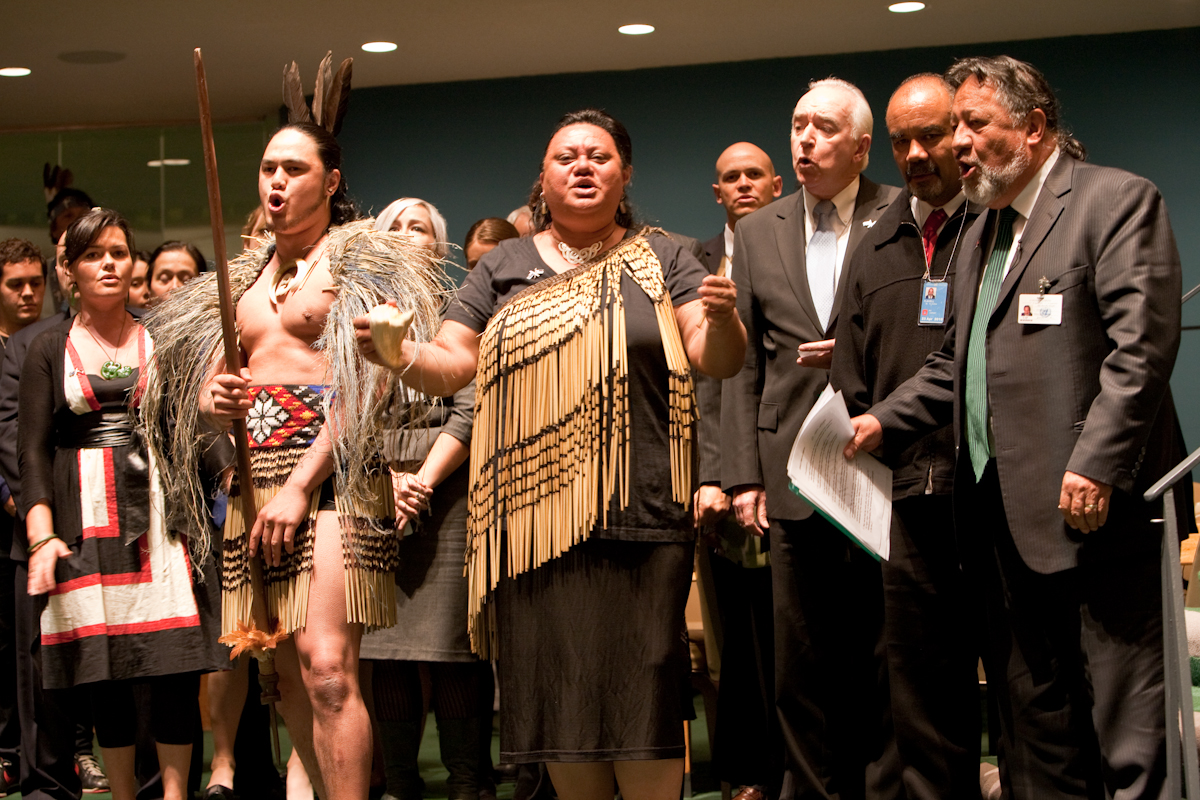
The New Zealand delegation, including Māori members, endorses the United Nations Declaration on the Rights of Indigenous Peoples in 2010

The 1989 ILO Convention on Indigenous and Tribal Peoples mainly concerns non-discrimination but also covers indigenous peoples' rights to development, customary laws, lands, territories and resources, employment, education and health. By 2013, the convention had been ratified by 22 countries, mainly in Latin America.

In 2007, the United Nations (UN) adopted a Declaration on the Rights of Indigenous Peoples (UNDRIP) specifying the collective rights of Indigenous peoples, including their rights to self-determination and to protect their cultures, identities, languages, ceremonies, and access to employment, health, education and natural resources. The declaration is not a formally binding treaty but some provisions might be considered customary international law. The declaration has been endorsed by at least 148 states but its provisions have not been consistently implemented.

Indigenous peoples confront a diverse range of concerns associated with their status and interaction with other cultural groups, as well as changes in their inhabited environment. Some challenges are specific to particular groups; however, other challenges are commonly experienced.

Wherever Indigenous cultural identity is asserted, common societal issues and concerns arise. These concerns are often not unique to Indigenous groups. Despite the diversity of Indigenous peoples, they share common problems and issues in dealing with the prevailing, or invading, society. They are generally concerned that the cultures and lands of Indigenous peoples are being lost and that Indigenous peoples suffer both discrimination and pressure to assimilate into the surrounding or colonizing societies. This is borne out by the fact that the lands and cultures of nearly all of the peoples listed at the end of this article are under threat. Notable exceptions are the Sakha and Komi peoples (two northern Indigenous peoples of Russia), who now control their own autonomous republics within the Russian state, and the Canadian Inuit, who form a majority of the territory of Nunavut (created in 1999). Despite the control of their territories, many Sakha people have lost their lands as a result of the Russian Homestead Act, which allows any Russian citizen to own any land in the Far Eastern region of Russia.

In Australia, a landmark case, Mabo v Queensland (No 2), saw the High Court of Australia reject the idea of terra nullius. This rejection ended up recognizing that there was a pre-existing system of law practiced by the Meriam people.

A 2009 United Nations publication says:

Although indigenous peoples are often portrayed as a hindrance to development, their cultures and traditional knowledge are also increasingly seen as assets. It is argued that it is important for the human species as a whole to preserve as wide a range of cultural diversity as possible, and that the protection of indigenous cultures is vital to this enterprise.

=== Human rights violations ===
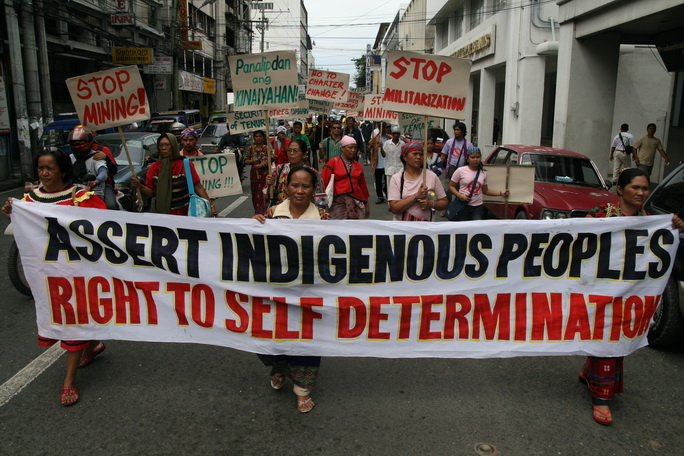
Indigenous peoples march for their right to self-determination in Davao City (2008).

According to Samuel Totten, some governments do not respect the rights of Indigenous peoples. In the latter part of the twentieth century the genocide of Indigenous peoples in Australia and Namibia attracted more attention from the international community including scholars and human rights organizations.

The Bangladeshi government has stated that there are "no indigenous peoples in Bangladesh". This statement has angered the Indigenous peoples of Chittagong Hill Tracts, Bangladesh, collectively known as the Jumma. Experts have protested against this move of the Bangladesh government and have questioned the government's definition of the term "indigenous peoples". This move by the Bangladesh government is seen by the Indigenous peoples of Bangladesh as another step by the Government to further erode their already limited rights.

Hindu Chams and Muslim Chams have both experienced religious and ethnic persecution and restrictions on their faith under the current Vietnamese government, with the Vietnamese state confiscating Cham property and forbidding Cham from observing their religious beliefs. Hindu temples were turned into tourist sites against the wishes of the Cham Hindus. In 2010 and 2013 several incidents occurred in Thành Tín and Phươc Nhơn villages where Cham were murdered by Vietnamese. In 2012, Vietnamese police in Chau Giang village stormed into a Cham Mosque, stole the electric generator, and also raped Cham girls. Cham in the Mekong Delta have also been economically marginalized, with ethnic Vietnamese settling on land previously owned by Cham people with state support.

The Indonesian government has outright denied the existence of Indigenous peoples within the countries' borders. In 2012, Indonesia stated that 'The Government of Indonesia supports the promotion and protection of indigenous people worldwide ... Indonesia, however, does not recognize the application of the indigenous peoples concept ... in the country'. Along with the brutal treatment of the country's Papuan people (a conservative estimate places the violent deaths at 100,000 people in West New Guinea since Indonesian occupation in 1963, see Papua conflict) has led to Survival International condemning Indonesia for treating its Indigenous peoples as the worst in the world.

The Vietnamese viewed and dealt with the Indigenous Montagnards from the Central Highlands of Vietnam as "savages", which caused a Montagnard uprising against the Vietnamese. The Vietnamese were originally centered around the Red River Delta but engaged in conquest and seized new lands such as Champa, the Mekong Delta (from Cambodia) and the Central Highlands during Nam Tien. While the Vietnamese received strong Chinese influence in their culture and civilization and were Sinicized, and the Cambodians and Laotians were Indianized, the Montagnards in the Central Highlands maintained their own Indigenous culture without adopting external culture and were the true Indigenous of the region. To hinder encroachment on the Central Highlands by Vietnamese nationalists, the term Pays Montagnard du Sud-Indochinois (PMSI) emerged for the Central Highlands along with the indigenous being addressed by the name Montagnard. The tremendous scale of Vietnamese Kinh colonists flooding into the Central Highlands has significantly altered the demographics of the region. The anti-ethnic minority discriminatory policies by the Vietnamese, environmental degradation, deprivation of lands from the Indigenous people, and settlement of Indigenous lands by an overwhelming number of Vietnamese settlers led to massive protests and demonstrations by the Central Highland's indigenous ethnic minorities against the Vietnamese in January–February 2001. This event gave a tremendous blow to the claim often published by the Vietnamese government that in Vietnam "There has been no ethnic confrontation, no religious war, no ethnic conflict. And no elimination of one culture by another."

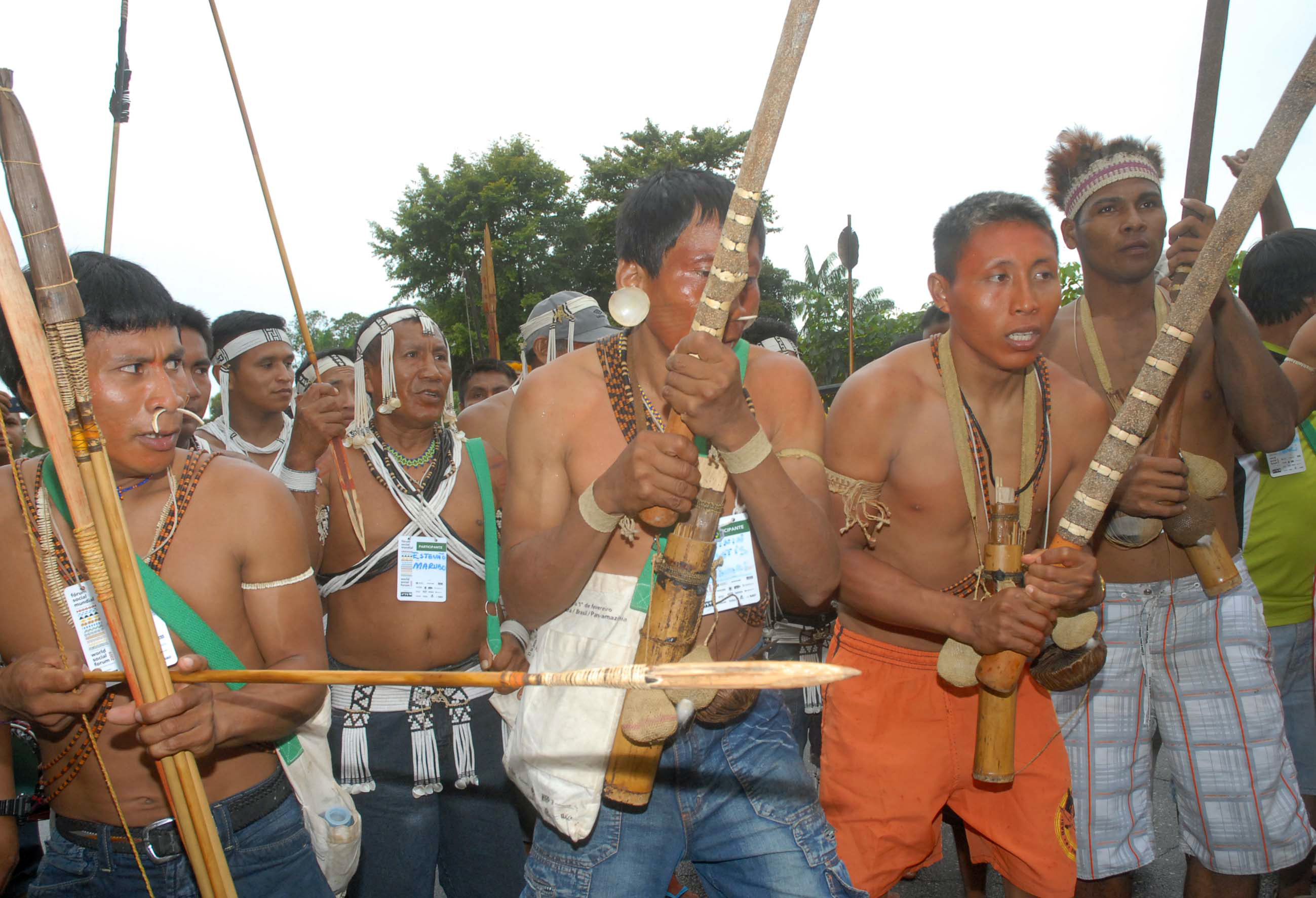
Indigenous protesters from Vale do Javari, one of the largest indigenous territories in Brazil

In May 2016, the Fifteenth Session of the United Nations Permanent Forum on Indigenous Issues (UNPFII) affirmed that Indigenous peoples are distinctive groups protected in international or national legislation as having a set of specific rights based on their linguistic and historical ties to a particular territory, prior to later settlement, development or occupation of a region. The session affirms that, since Indigenous peoples are vulnerable to exploitation, marginalization, oppression, forced assimilation, and genocide by nation states formed from colonizing populations or by different, politically dominant ethnic groups, individuals and communities maintaining ways of life indigenous to their regions are entitled to special protection.

The Indigenous people from Tanzania's Maasai community were reportedly subjected to eviction from their ancestral land to make way for a luxury game reserve by Otterlo Business Corporation in June 2022. The game reserve was reportedly being set up for the royals of the United Arab Emirates also linked to OBC or the Otterlo Business Corporation. According to lawyers and human rights groups and activists, approximately 30 Maasai people were injured by security forces in the process of eviction and delimiting a land area of 1,500 km^{2} (580 sq mi). A 2019 UN report has described OBC as a 'UAE-based' luxury-game hunting company, granted a license to hunt by the Tanzanian government in 1992 for "the UAE royal family to organize private hunting trips", denying the Maasai people access to their own land.

=== Health issues ===
In December 1993, the United Nations General Assembly proclaimed the International Decade of the World's Indigenous People, and requested UN specialized agencies to consider with governments and indigenous people how they can contribute to the success of the Decade of Indigenous People, commencing in December 1994. As a consequence, the World Health Organization (WHO), at its Forty-seventh World Health Assembly, established a core advisory group of Indigenous representatives with special knowledge of the health needs and resources of their communities, thus beginning a long-term commitment to the issue of the health of Indigenous peoples.

The WHO noted in 2003 that "Statistical data on the health status of indigenous peoples is scarce. This is especially notable for indigenous peoples in Africa, Asia and eastern Europe", but snapshots from various countries (where such statistics are available) show that indigenous people are in worse health than the general population, in advanced and developing countries alike: higher incidence of diabetes in some regions of Australia; higher prevalence of poor sanitation and lack of safe water among Twa households in Rwanda; a greater prevalence of childbirths without prenatal care among ethnic minorities in Vietnam; suicide rates among Inuit youth in Canada are eleven times higher than the national average; infant mortality rates are higher for Indigenous peoples everywhere.

The first UN publication on the State of the World's Indigenous Peoples revealed alarming statistics about indigenous peoples' health. Health disparities between indigenous and non-indigenous populations are evident in both developed and developing countries. Native Americans in the United States are 600 times more likely to acquire tuberculosis and 62% more likely to commit suicide than the non-Indian population. Tuberculosis, obesity, and type 2 diabetes are major health concerns for the indigenous in developed countries. Globally, health disparities touch upon nearly every health issue, including HIV/AIDS, cancer, malaria, cardiovascular disease, malnutrition, parasitic infections, and respiratory diseases, affecting indigenous peoples at much higher rates. Many causes of Indigenous children's mortality could be prevented. Poorer health conditions amongst indigenous peoples result from longstanding societal issues, such as extreme poverty and racism, but also the intentional marginalization and dispossession of Indigenous peoples by dominant, non-Indigenous populations and societal structures.

=== Racism and discrimination ===
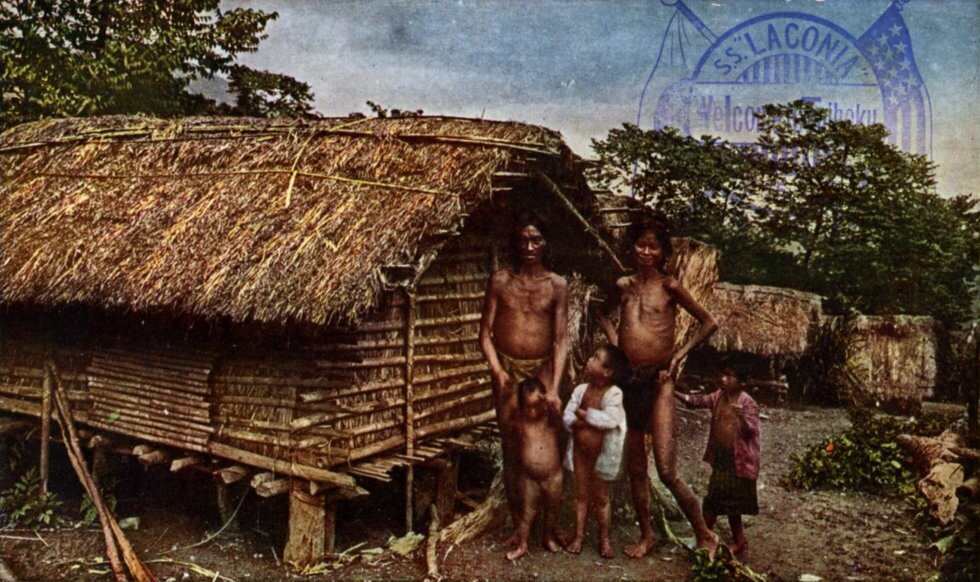
"Savages of Mokka and Their House in Formosa", pre-1945, Taiwan under Japanese rule

Indigenous peoples have frequently been subjected to various forms of racism and discrimination. Indigenous peoples have been denoted as being barbaric, primitive, savage or uncivilized. These terms were commonly used during the heyday of European colonial expansion, and they are still being used by certain societies in modern times.

During the 17th century, Europeans commonly labeled Indigenous peoples "uncivilized". Some philosophers, such as Thomas Hobbes (1588–1679), considered Indigenous people mere "savages". Others (especially literary figures in the 18th century) popularized the concept of "noble savages". Those who were close to the Hobbesian view tended to believe that they had a duty to "civilize" and "modernize" the Indigenous.

Survival International runs a campaign to stamp out media portrayals of Indigenous peoples as "primitives" or "savages".

After World War I (1914–1918), many Europeans came to doubt the morality of the means which were used to "civilize" peoples. At the same time, the anti-colonial movement, and advocates for the rights of Indigenous peoples, argued that words such as "civilized" and "savage" were products and tools of colonialism, and they also argued that colonialism itself was savagely destructive. In the mid-20th century, European attitudes began to shift to the view that Indigenous and tribal peoples are the only peoples who should have the right to decide what should happen to their ancient cultures and their ancestral lands.

=== Cultural appropriation ===
New Age and Neopagan adherents often look to the cultures of Indigenous peoples seeking to find ancient traditional truths and spiritual practices to appropriate into their lifestyles and worldviews.

=== Environmental injustice ===
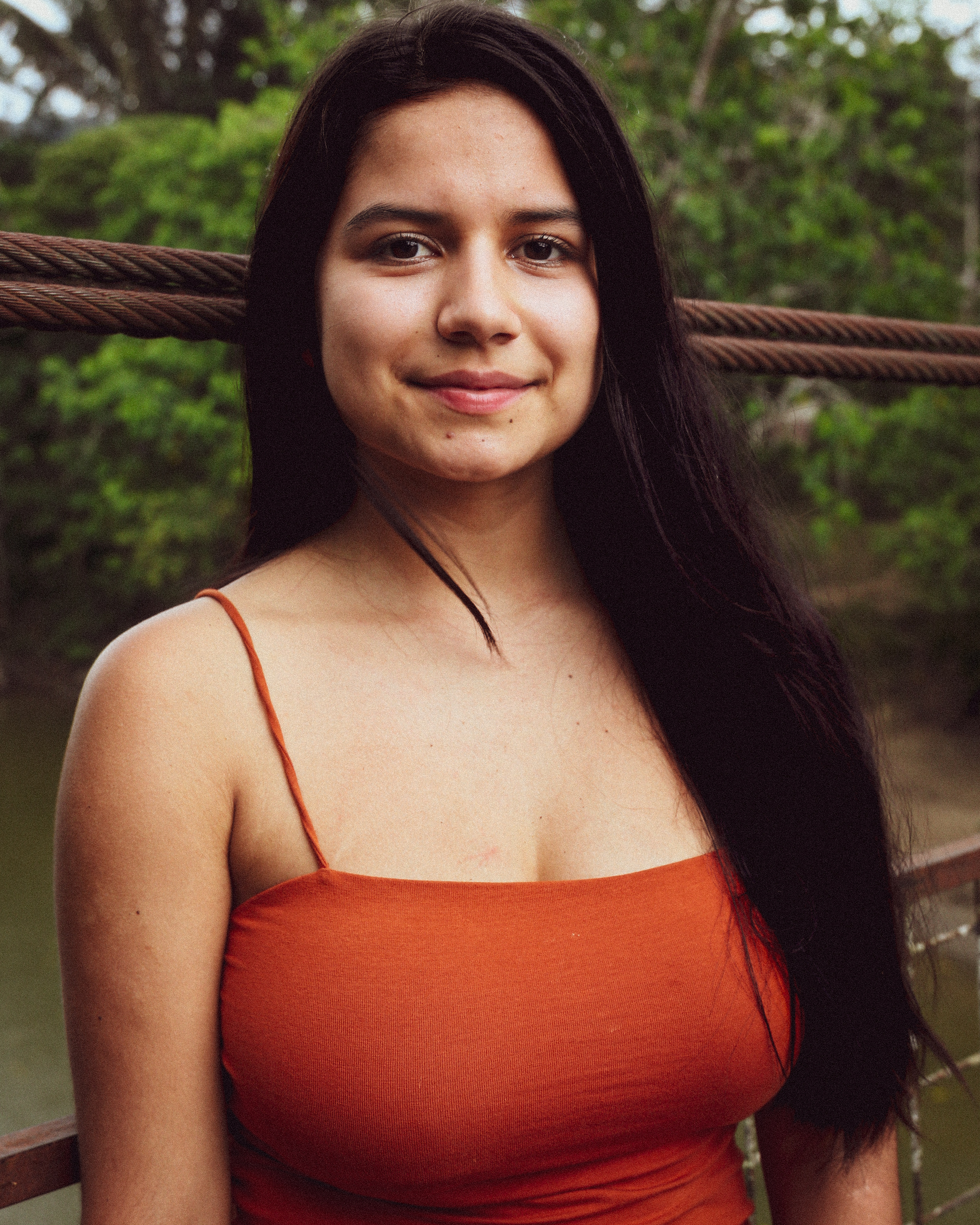
Helena Gualinga, an indigenous environmental and human rights activist

At an international level, Indigenous peoples have received increased recognition of their environmental rights since 2002, but few countries respect these rights in reality. The UN Declaration on the Rights of Indigenous Peoples, adopted by the General Assembly in 2007, established Indigenous peoples' right to self-determination, stating rights to manage natural resources, and cultural and intellectual property. In countries where these rights are recognized, land titling and demarcation procedures are often put on delay, or leased out by the state as concessions for extractive industries without consulting Indigenous communities.

Many in the United States federal government are in favor of exploiting oil reserves in the Arctic National Wildlife Refuge, where the Gwich'in Indigenous people rely on herds of caribou. Oil drilling could destroy thousands of years of culture for the Gwich'in. On the other hand, some of the Inupiat people, from another Indigenous community in the region, favor oil drilling because they could benefit economically.

The introduction of industrial agricultural technologies such as fertilizers, pesticides, and large plantation schemes have destroyed ecosystems that Indigenous communities formerly depended on, forcing resettlement. Development projects such as dam construction, pipelines and resource extraction have displaced large numbers of Indigenous peoples, often without providing compensation. Governments have forced Indigenous peoples off of their ancestral lands in the name of ecotourism and national park development. Indigenous women are especially affected by land dispossession because they must walk longer distances for water and fuel wood. These women also become economically dependent on men when they lose their livelihoods. Indigenous groups asserting their rights has most often resulted in torture, imprisonment, or death.

The building of dams can hurt Indigenous peoples by hurting the ecosystems that provide them water, food. For example, the Munduruku people in the Amazon rainforest are opposing the building of Tapajós dam with the help of Greenpeace.

Most Indigenous populations are already subject to the deleterious effects of climate change. Climate change has not only environmental, but also human rights and socioeconomic implications for Indigenous communities. The World Bank acknowledges climate change as an obstacle to Millennium Development Goals, notably the fight against poverty, disease, and child mortality, in addition to environmental sustainability.

=== Use of indigenous knowledge ===
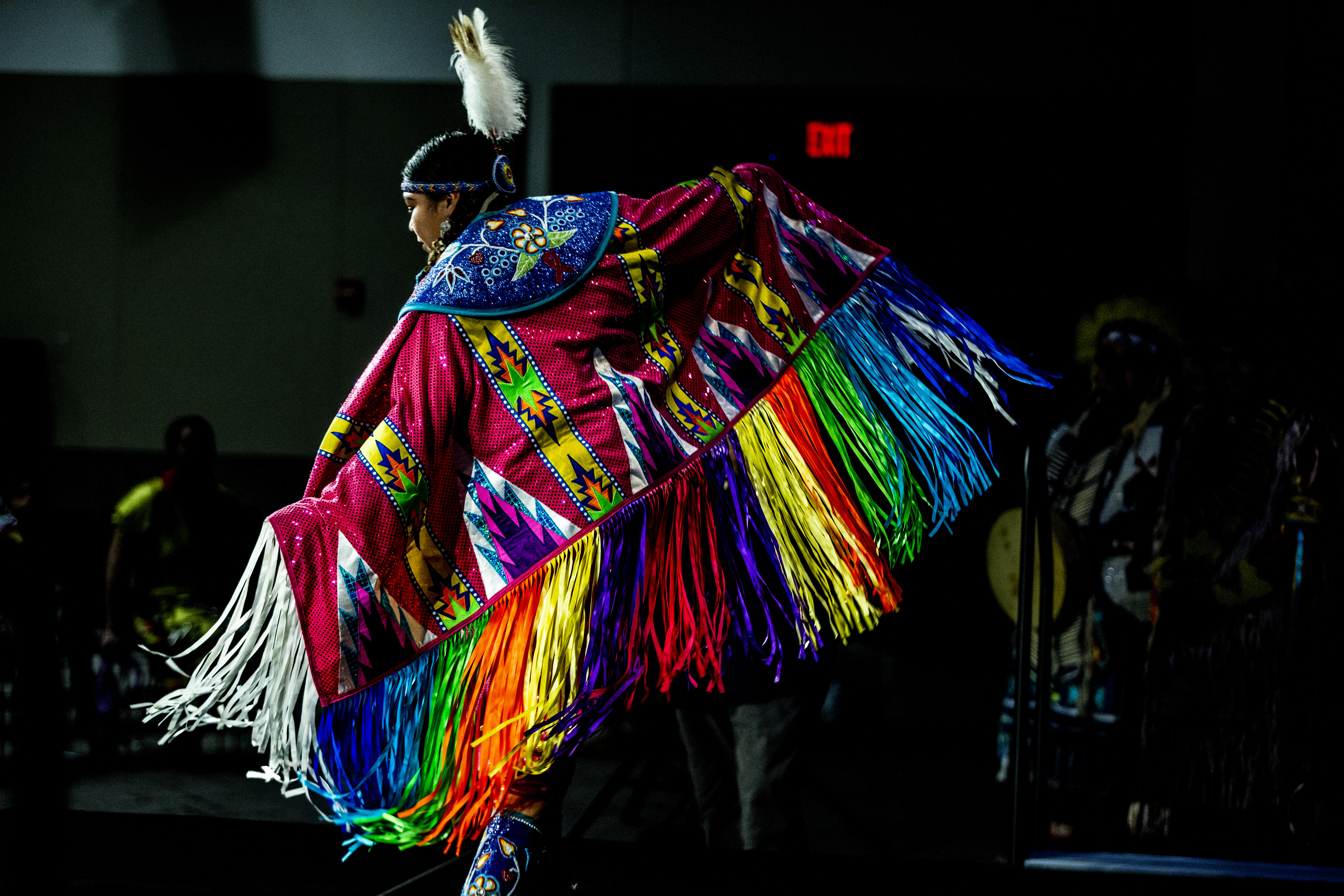
Native American dancer of the Save Our Ancestors Remains and Resources Indigenous Network Group (SOARRING) Foundation, a not-for-profit organization whose mission is to educate people about Indigenous ways of life

Indigenous knowledge is considered as very important for issues linked with sustainability. Indigenous peoples play an essential role in conserving biodiversity around the world. An oft-cited statistic is that Indigenous peoples steward lands which comprise 80% of the world's biodiversity. In 2024, Fernández-Llamazares et al. investigated the origin of this claim in Nature and found that it is without basis, also stating that "biodiversity" is broad and not precisely definable, and that the claim may do more harm than good. With a specific description, such as "natural lands" (that being lands with low levels of ecological disturbance), it can be said that at least 37% of remaining natural lands fall within the territories of Indigenous peoples. Fernández-Llamazares et al. state that the 80% claim "could undermine these and other rigorous studies — as well as effective efforts to conserve biodiversity by Indigenous Peoples on the ground".

The Western and Eastern Penan people are two major groups of Indigenous populations in Malaysia. The Eastern Penan are famous for their resistance to loggers threatening their natural resources, specifically Sago palms and various fruit bearing trees. Because of the Penan's international fame, environmentalists often visited the area to document such happenings and learn more about and from the people there, including their perspective on the land's invasion.

Environmentalists such as Davis and Henley, who Brosius writes lumped all native groups of Malaysia into one homogeneous group with the same ideas and traditions, and lacked dialectical connections needed to deeply understand the Penan, lacked full knowledge of the situation's specific weight to the Indigenous peoples. The two embarked on a mission, stating they wished to help with conservation of the Penan's land resources, but Brosious states they were among the many who repackaged traditional knowledge into something that fit a Western narrative and agenda, and that Davis and Henley romanticized and misconstrued the traditional Penan concept of molong (meaning: "to preserve" – the Penan marked trees for personal use and to preserve them for future harvesting of fruits or for materials).

Another common occurrence is to extend Indigenous knowledge beyond its limits and into unrelated meanings that western consumers find spiritually profound. This tendency of journalists extends beyond Davis and Henley. It serves non-Natives to add a narrative and value beyond that which already exists within the knowledge base of Indigenous peoples. Not only do these fictionalized accounts of some Indigenous knowledge and traditions skew the beliefs of onlookers, but they also contribute to cultural genocide as the actual spiritual and religious beliefs of the Indigenous people are disappeared and replaced with the westernized fiction.

== See also ==
- Collective rights
- Cultural appropriation
- Ethnic minority
- Ecotourism § Impact on Indigenous people and Indigenous land
- Genocide of Indigenous peoples
- Human rights
- The Image Expedition
- Indigenism
- Indigenous Futurisms
- Indigenous Peoples Climate Change Assessment Initiative
- Intangible cultural heritage
- International Day of the World's Indigenous Peoples
- National Indigenous Peoples Day, Canada
- Indigenous Peoples' Day (United States)
- Isuma
- Jus sanguinis, 'right of blood'
- List of active non-governmental organizations of national minorities, Indigenous and diasporas
- List of ethnic groups
- List of Indigenous peoples
- Missing and murdered Indigenous women
- Uncontacted peoples
- Virgin soil epidemic

== Sources ==
- Bodley, John H. (2008). Victims of Progress (5th ed.). Plymouth, England: AltaMira Press. ISBN 978-0-7591-1148-6.
- Pagden, Anthony (2001). Peoples and Empires. London: Weidenfeld & Nicolson. ISBN 0-297-643703.
- Salemink, Oscar (2003). The Ethnography of Vietnam's Central Highlanders: A Historical Contextualization, 1850–1990. University of Hawai'i Press. ISBN 978-0-8248-2579-9. Archived from the original on 15 March 2023.
- Taylor, Alan (2013). Colonial America: A Very Short Introduction. New York: Oxford University Press.
