= The Birth of Coffee =

Transmedia project about people working to produce coffee

The Birth of Coffee is a transmedia project which includes a book of words and images, a photographic exhibit, and a website. It focuses on the people worldwide who grow and produce coffee. The project illustrates how coffee – combined with the volatile locations where it grows and labor-intensive growing processes – often shapes those people's lives.

== Project ==
The Lorenzettis, a husband and wife team, created this project by documenting their visits to eight major coffee-producing countries. The countries included in the book are Ethiopia, Yemen, Indonesia, Brazil, Colombia, Costa Rica, Guatemala, and Kenya. The author and photographer recorded multiple aspects of coffee bean production, from the agricultural stage, through the refinement process, to selling at market and traditional local coffee rituals. In an effort to aid the coffee laborers who opened their lives to the Lorenzettis, a portion of the proceeds from the project is donated to Habitat For Humanity.

The Birth of Coffee is a project created by The Image Expedition, a not-for-profit organization "designed to photographically document and preserve ancient places and indigenous ways of life that, with the passage of time, might otherwise be lost forever... it is global visual artifact gathering."

== Book ==
The book, published by Random House, has two components: the first is 100 black and white photographs by Daniel Lorenzetti, which were toned by using coffee. The second component is narrative text by Linda Rice Lorenzetti. She addresses the social and historical impact of the coffee trade on producing nations, as well as on the people who grow it.

== Exhibition ==
The Birth of Coffee exhibition is composed of 40 original gelatin silver prints, selected from the book, complemented by the author's narrative text. To date, it has exhibited in 14+ U.S. cities, with audiences estimated at 500,000. Exhibition venues have included botanical gardens, art museums, public libraries, and an array of private galleries. Notable venues are as follows:

- Copia, the American Center for Wine, Food, and the Arts (Napa, California)
- The Armory Arts Center (West Palm Beach, Florida)
- United States Botanic Garden (Washington D.C.)
- Morton Arboretum (Chicago, Illinois)
- Marjorie McNeely Conservatory at Como Park and Zoo (St. Paul, Minnesota)
- Missouri Botanical Garden (St. Louis, Missouri)
- Broome Street Gallery (New York, New York)
- Teton County Library Jackson Hole, Wyoming
- Kansas City Public Library (Kansas City, Missouri)
- The Public Library of Cincinnati (Cincinnati, Ohio)
- The Arts Council of Greater Baton Rouge (Baton Rouge, Louisiana)
- The Southern Food and Beverage Museum (New Orleans, Louisiana)
- The Chicago Academy of Sciences Notabeart Nature Museum (Downtown Chicago)
- The Craft and Folk Art Museum (Los Angeles, California)
- Miami Dade College - Centre Gallery (Miami, Florida)

== Project sponsors ==
The Birth of Coffee project has been sponsored by the following companies, whose contributions have been funding for exhibitions and purchasing books:

Community Coffee, Folgers Coffee Company, Millstone Coffee Company, Sara Lee Coffee and Tea, Maxwell House, Gevalia, Rothfos Corporation, Ronnoco Coffee Company, Caribou Coffee, and F.Gavina and Sons.

== See also ==
- The Coffeelands Trust
