= The Image Expedition =

Non-profit organisation

The Image Expedition is an American nonprofit organization that produces work across a variety of mediums concerning the documentation of indigenous ways of life that are at risk of fading into obscurity. Their documentary work is largely in the field of still photography and video, often with accompanying text, and has been the subject of published books and museum exhibitions. They are perhaps best known for The Birth of Coffee, a photographic project which was exhibited in 23 U.S. cities and compiled into a 2001 book.

== History ==
The Image Expedition was founded in 1990 by Daniel Lorenzetti, funded in part by a grant which Lorenzetti had recently been awarded by the South Florida Cultural Consortium's Visual Artist Fellowship. The editorial director of the Image Expedition is Daniel's wife, Linda Rice Lorenzetti, whose writing has been published in The Adventure of Food: True Stories of Eating Everything (Travelers' Tales, 1999), and Image Expedition's own The Birth of Coffee (Random House, 2001).

== Purpose ==
The main goal of the organization is to create 'visual artifacts' — "words and images that document ancient sites, unusual occupations and traditional ways of life, many disappearing in the digital age." Examples of visual artifacts preserved by the Image Expedition range from cricket sellers in Beijing's public markets, to the Mingangkabau in Indonesia — one of the last existing matrilineal cultures, to duckherders in Burma, to public human cremation in Bali, to name a few.

The Image Expedition states that they are committed to respecting the culture present in the places they visit, conscious of their role as outside observers and the inherent risk they pose of imposing their will, artistic or otherwise, onto foreign ways of life. Daniel Lorenzetti has said, "As Americans, we can't pretend to understand many of these people's lives. We can only observe them."

== Projects ==
The Image Expedition's pilot project was a one-month trip to Ecuador in 1990, during which they documented diverse communities within the country, from the Andes mountains to the Amazon basin. In 1995 the team traveled to document rural areas of China, Yemen, Cambodia, and Burma. In 1996 the team spent two months photographing and gathering stories from Indonesia, specifically the islands of Bali, Java, Sumatra, Kalimantan and Sulawesi. All of the above research culminated in the publication of Collecting Visual Artifacts, published by IX/Lighthouse Press in 1998.

Research for the Lorenzettis' second project, The Birth of Coffee, began in 1996. The aim of the project was to encourage awareness of the long and difficult process undertaken by many people across the world in order to produce coffee, and its essential but seldom considered role in millions of people's lives. For it, they traveled to eight countries across five continents, photographically documenting the landscape, people and agriculture of the area. This work would be exhibited across an extensive international tour, and in 2001 was published as a book, containing photos by Daniel with writing by Linda.

== Sponsors ==
The Image Expedition's work has been made possible by donations from the following sponsors: Continental Airlines (provides tickets), Sheraton Hotels and Resorts (provides accommodations), Magellan (supplied GPS device), Olympus America (supplies cameras), Ilford (supplies film and paper), Print File (donates photographic and archival supplies), Royal Robbins (supplies travel clothing), Imacon (supplies scanners), Winsor & Newton (supplies easels), Eagle Creek (supplies luggage), Lonely Planet (supplies travel guides), and Dell (supplies laptops).

== Collections ==
The Image Expedition's photographs are in the permanent collections of the Victoria and Albert Museum (London, England), the Corcoran Gallery of Art (Washington, D.C.), and the Santa Barbara Museum of Art (Santa Barbara, CA).
