= Daniel Lorenzetti =

American author and documentary photographer

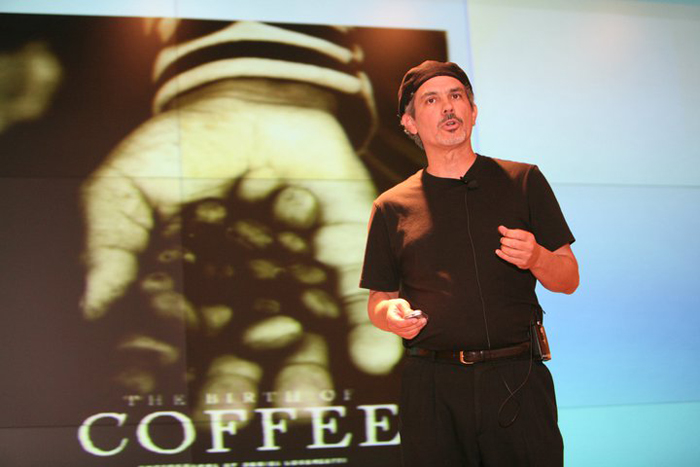
Daniel Lorenzetti speaking about The Birth of Coffee in Austin, Texas in 2010

Daniel Lorenzetti is an American author, documentary photographer, and explorer. He is also a frequent speaker on the subject of entertainment innovation specifically in the areas of transmedia and collaborative storytelling.

== Early life ==
Lorenzetti was born in Fort Lauderdale, Florida, to Daniel G. Lorenzetti and Palma Lorenzetti. His father was an executive in the shoe business and his mother was a housewife. When Lorenzetti was ten years old, the family moved to Canton, Massachusetts, where he attended public junior high and high school.

== Education ==
Lorenzetti received a nomination from Senator Edward Kennedy to attend the United States Air Force Academy. He attended the academy for half a year before resigning to attend Boston College, where he simultaneously earned a B.A. in English and B.S. in economics in just a little over three years.

He went on to study and graduate from Antioch School of Law (now the University of the District of Columbia David A. Clarke School of Law) and concurrently studied journalism in the master's degree program at the University of Maryland.

While teaching at Florida Atlantic University, he completed another master's degree in counseling psychology. In 1987 he received a scholarship from the Italian Cultural Society to study Italian language and Italian Renaissance art in Italy.

== Journalism and White House staff internship ==
During his time in journalism school, he worked as an investigative reporter in Washington, D.C., for The MacNeil-Lehrer Report on PBS.

Lorenzetti worked as a White House staff intern under President Jimmy Carter, where he served for a year in the Executive Office of the President working on a variety of administration initiatives for the White House Office of Public Liaison.

== Documentary work ==
In 1998 Lorenzetti was chosen to receive the South Florida Cultural Consortium's Visual Artist Fellowship and he received a $15,000 cash award for his documentary photography which he used in part to create The Image Expedition, a not-for-profit documentary organization which serves to "photographically document and preserve ancient places and indigenous ways of life that, with the passage of time, might otherwise be lost forever...it is global visual artifact gathering."

Lorenzetti's work as a documentary photographer and writer has been featured in over 20 publications, notably The New York Times and The Miami Herald. Lorenzetti and his wife, Linda Rice Lorenzetti, the writer, have produced two transmedia projects together: The Birth of Coffee, published by Random House in 2001, and Collecting Visual Artifacts, published by IX/Lighthouse Press in 1998. Both projects have also become traveling exhibitions appearing at exhibition venues throughout the United States.

Lorenzetti’s photographs are also part of the permanent collection at The Victoria and Albert Museum in London, the National Gallery of Art in Washington, D.C. (Corcoran Gallery of Art) and the Santa Barbara Museum of Art.

He is currently working on his next documentary project, The Birth of Chocolate.

== Explorer in Residence ==
In 2012 Lorenzetti was appointed Explorer in Residence for the Chicago Academy of Sciences Peggy Notebaert Nature Museum along with his wife, Linda Rice Lorenzetti. Twice a year he and Rice Lorenzetti travel to Chicago for a museum residency where they make public appearances and conduct public presentations on behalf of the museum.

In 2014 Lorenzetti was also appointed Explorer in Residence for KIT – The Royal Tropical Institute in Amsterdam.

== Teaching ==
Lorenzetti taught Business Law and Mass Communication at Palm Beach Atlantic College as an adjunct professor for ten years, and next taught as adjunct professor of Law and Communications at Florida Atlantic University for two years. He also taught Law and Government at Nova University.

Lorenzetti has been recently appointed Director of Transmedia Research and Initiatives for the Florida State University College of Motion Picture Arts.

== Publishing ==
Lorenzetti served as the Executive Editor for Palm Beach Illustrated magazine from 1980-81. When Palm Beach Illustrated was sold he turned to technology and the media, working on the national editorial board for Home-Office Computing magazine for a year and was an original member of the national editorial advisory board for On the Internet Magazine where he contributed a regular monthly column.

More recently Lorenzetti has written for Candy Industry Magazine, publishing an article titled "Salon del Cacao Lima - Peru promotes the country’s cacao crop" in October 2013.

== Early internet years ==
While at On the Internet Lorenzetti developed and published one of the first public design and usability standards for the then fledgling World Wide Web.

Lorenzetti served as a national editorial advisory board member in 1989-90 for On the Internet, the publication of The Internet Society and was involved in the early conversation and critical thinking about the Internet and its structure and use.

Lorenzetti was also a frequent speaker at very early Internet gatherings like Internet World and DCI's Internet Expo in 1997 in Boston. Along with his wife, the writer Linda Rice Lorenzetti, he authored one of the first widely accepted and used guides to the early Internet entitled An Introduction to the Internet which was used by colleges, universities and corporations when the Internet was in its infancy.

He served as president for six years of The Technology Consultants, and then for ten years as the president of The Web Workshop, which provided international web counseling and development.

== Public speaking ==
Lorenzetti speaks frequently about his work as an explorer and documentarian on behalf of his organization – The Image Expedition and projects Collecting Visual Artifacts, The Birth of Coffee and the Birth of Chocolate. Recently he has spoken about thinking and thriving in difficult and dangerous places based on his challenging travel for his documentary work. Over the years he has also continued to speak about innovative media and transmedia storytelling.

In 2009 he led a core discussion at South by Southwest (SXSW) Interactive in Austin, Texas, titled "How Safe is Your Domain Name". In 2010 he spoke again at South by Southwest presenting a Late Break session "Transmedia Storytelling - Are we There Yet?". He has started and is editing an online resource for transmedia initiatives at www.transmediamatrix.com. In 2011 Lorenzetti spoke at SXSW Film hosting a presentation "Can Transmedia Save the Entertainment Industry?" Also in 2011 he spoke at the SXSW Interactive Tech Summit when he was invited by the organizers to give a presentation about Transmedia Storytelling at a panel entitled Transmedia Entertainment: Audience Connection - Commercial Success.

In November 2011 Lorenzetti spoke on Transmedia Storytelling at Full Sail University in Orlando.

On October 18, 2012, Lorenzetti moderated a panel at Storyworld Los Angeles on legal issues for transmedia stakeholders, entitled "Rights and Ownership".

Lorenzetti spoke at Columbia College Chicago on October 17, 2013, about doing documentary work.

Also in Chicago, Lorenzetti spoke at Year Up Chicago on May 2, 2014, in a talk titled "Thinking and Thriving in Difficult and Dangerous Places".

== Current work ==
Lorenzetti is currently making regular contributions to Moving Pictures magazine as Contributing Editor for Entertainment Innovation.

Lorenzetti was recently appointed to the position of Director of Transmedia Research and Initiatives for the Florida State University College of Motion Picture Arts, where he intends to research and document the transmedia movement by interviewing key individuals making important contributions to the movement.

In the past few years, Lorenzetti has concentrated on writing fiction. He has stated in his transmedia presentations at SXSW that he is building a transmedia story franchise entitled The Mercuri Cycle... 'a novel ride in spoke and word'. He has completed the first novel in the series, a work of speculative fiction, entitled Marked For Delivery. He is currently at work on the second installment in the series. He has stated that The Mercuri Cycle is intended to be a trilogy complete with an ending to the story developed in a unique manner. He is represented by industry veteran - Hollywood literary agent, Joel Gotler, of Intellectual Property Group.

== Personal life ==
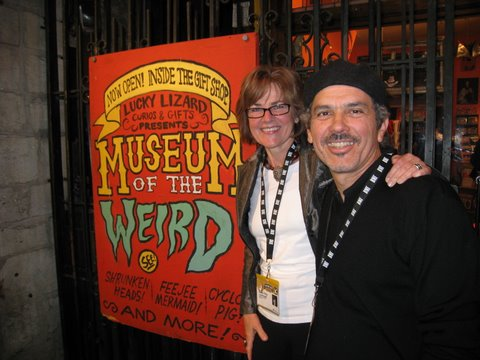
Daniel Lorenzetti and Linda Rice Lorenzetti at SXSW

Lorenzetti is married to author Linda Rice Lorenzetti and lives in Austin, Texas, and Three Forks, Montana.

== Publications ==
- Interview with Cinematographer Rodrigo Prieto, Moving Pictures Magazine, April 2011
- The Birth of Coffee, Random House, 2001
- Collecting Visual Artifacts, IX/Lighthouse Press, 1998
- On the Internet magazine column: "The Internet: The Testimony of Two Travellers" from May 1996, "Why Web Pages Fail?" from June 1996, "Remember the 'Build' in building a Web Site" from July 1996, "The time is now for an Internet Intervention" from Jan 1997, "Internet thoughts and resources from abroad" from March 1997
