= Law on the Far Eastern Hectare =

Russian law concerning land ownership

The Law on the Far Eastern Hectare, or the Federal Law of May 1, 2016, No. 119 FL, is a law by Russian president Vladimir Putin to give 1 hectare (2.5 acres) of free land in the Russian Far East to Russian citizens and foreign nationals as long as they live there for five years.

The plan allows only Russian citizens to own the land. Foreigners can join the program, but cannot own the land until 5 years after they have immigrated to Russia. Consolidated groups (of 20 lots minimum) will also be provided with basic infrastructure. As of December 2017, more than 107,000 people have applied and 40,000 people have become owners of the land.
