= The Coffeelands Trust =

The Coffeelands Trust (Coffeelands Landmine Victims' Trust) is a project that provides direct support to victims of conflict who live and work in coffee communities throughout the world. The Trust seeks to connect the coffee industry and coffee consumers to victims of conflict and provides resources for rehabilitation services and economic development opportunities. It is a project of the non-profit organization Polus Center for Social & Economic Development based in Clinton, Massachusetts, United States. A grant from the Office of Weapons Removal and Abatement, a part of the U.S. Department of State, helped create the trust.

== History ==
Dean Cycon, owner of Deans Beans, a coffee-roasting company in Orange, Massachusetts and Michael Lundquist, Executive Director of the Polus Center for Social & Economic Development, have worked for many years in developing countries to promote social and economic justice for some of the world's most vulnerable groups. Deans Beans and the Polus Center have partnered in the grassroots development projects that have created economic opportunity for "death train" victims in Tapachula, Mexico, assisted people with disabilities to create small businesses in Nicaragua, and worked together to address basic nutritional needs and helped to combat social stigma for people with leprosy in Ethiopia.

In 2005, Cycon's knowledge and experience with coffee farmers and their struggles and Lundquist's work with landmine victims allowed them to make the connection between landmines, unexploded ordnance, or UXO, and coffee. After reviewing the data, they determined that landmines and UXO were present in six of the ten top coffee-producing countries in the world, and that these deadly devices not only kill and maim coffee farmers and their families, but have a significant negative impact on coffee production and the quality of coffee.

While the Ottawa Treaty focused the world's attention on the need to address the landmine issue, the majority of money and resources are directed toward mine removal and mine risk education. There is very little support allocated to direct victim assistance. The Coffeelands Trust works with communities in Central America and Colombia, and is expanding their partnerships in Southeast Asia and Africa.

The United States and other donor nations have made substantial progress in the areas of landmine removal and mine risk education, but resources for direct victim assistance have been minimal. Because of the lack of resources for rehabilitation services, many landmine survivors are facing a very uncertain future.
