= K. Wayne Yang =

Scholar of community organizing and critical pedagogy

K. Wayne Yang is a professor and scholar of community organizing, critical pedagogy, and Indigenous and decolonizing studies. He is a professor of ethnic studies at the University of California, San Diego and Provost of John Muir College. He writes about decolonization and everyday epic organizing, often with his frequent collaborator, Eve Tuck. He edits the journal Critical Ethnic Studies. He is interested in the complex role of cities in global affairs: cities as sites of settler colonialism, as stages for empire, as places of resettlement and gentrification, and as always-already on Indigenous lands.

== Education and awards ==
Wayne Yang graduated with his M.A. in Education from University of California, Berkeley, and received his Ph.D. in Education from University of California, Berkeley. He also holds a B.A. in Physics from Harvard University.

Yang received the Academic Senate Distinguished Teaching Award in 2010.

== Professional activities ==
Before his academic career, he was a public school teacher in Oakland, California for 15 years. During this time, he co-founded the Avenues Project, a non-profit youth development organization, as well as East Oakland Community High School, which were inspired by the Survival Programs of the Black Panther Party.

In partnership with Eve Tuck, Yang is the co-founder of the Land Relationship Super Collective. The Land Relationship Super Collective is a grassroots collective of university-based academics that aid decolonization through land reclamation.

At the University of California, San Diego, he co-founded the Indigenous Futures Institute (IFI) and Black Like Water. IFI is an Indigenous-led institute that aims to counter the legacy of unethical scientific practice and Indigenous peoples. IFI channels a community-based participatory model to create community-driven solutions to climate crisis, global pandemics, and the continued denial of Indigenous sovereignty. Black Like Water is a place-based approach to Black belonging in Matkulaxuuy, Kumeyaay territory (a.k.a La Jolla, San Diego) which identifies, amplifies, and analyzes narratives and practices that highlight the significance of honoring Black relationships to the natural world. The signature program of Black Like Water is Black Surf Week, which has taken place annually since 2019.

== Selected publications ==
- Yang, K. Wayne. (2020) "Sustainability as Plantation Logic, Or, Who Plots an Architecture of Freedom?". www.e-flux.com.
- Yang, K. Wayne Teshome, Tezeru; (2018). "Not Child but MeagerSexualization and Negation of Black Childhood". Small Axe: A Caribbean Journal of Criticism. 22 (3 (57)): 160–170. doi:10.1215/07990537-7249292. ISSN 0799-0537.
- Yang, K. Wayne Yang (2015). Welch, Edwina; Ruanto-Ramirez, Joseph; Magpusao, Nancy (eds.). "Deep Organizing: To Build the beloved community". Nexus: Complicating community & centering the self: 9–21.
- Tuck, Eve; Yang, K. Wayne (2014). "Unbecoming Claims: Pedagogies of Refusal in Qualitative Research". Qualitative Inquiry. 20 (6): 811–818. doi:10.1177/1077800414530265. ISSN 1077-8004.
- Paperson, la (2014). "A ghetto land pedagogy: an antidote for settler environmentalism". Environmental Education Research. 20 (1): 115–130. doi:10.1080/13504622.2013.865115. ISSN 1350-4622.
- Tuck, E., & Yang, K. (2013). R-words: Refusing research. In D. Paris & M. T. Winn (Eds.), Humanizing research: Decolonizing qualitative inquiry with youth and communities. SAGE Publications.
- Eve, Tuck; Yang, K. Wayne (2012). "Decolonization is not a metaphor". Decolonization: Indigeneity, Education & Society. 1(1): 1–40.
- paperson, la (2010). “The postcolonial ghetto: Seeing her shape and his hand”. Berkeley Review of Education, 1(1).
- Yang, K. Wayne (2009). "Mathematics, critical literacy, and youth participatory action research". New Directions for Youth Development. 2009 (123): 99–118. doi:10.1002/yd.317
- Yang, K Wayne. (2009). Discipline or Punish? Some Suggestions for School Policy and Teacher Practice. Language Arts, 87(1), 49-61.
- Yang, K. Wayne (2007). "Organizing MySpace: Youth walkouts, pleasure, politics and new media". Educational Foundations. vol. 21, no. 1-2: 9–28.
