= Eve Tuck =

American indigenous studies scholar

- Citizenship: Unangax̂, American
- Education: B.A. (2001), Eugene Lang College, The New School for Social Research; Ph.D. (2008), The Graduate Center, City University of New York
- Occupations: Academic, author
- Awards: Ford Foundation Postdoctoral Scholarship, William T. Grant Foundation Scholar

Eve Tuck is an Unangax̂ scholar in the field of Indigenous studies and educational research. Tuck is the James Weldon Professor of Indigenous Studies and founding Director of the Provostial Center for Indigenous Studies at NYU in 2024 as the founding director of its Center for Indigenous Studies. Previously, Tuck was the Professor of Critical Race and Indigenous Studies at the Ontario Institute for Studies in Education at the University of Toronto.

== Education ==
Tuck is a member of the Aleut Community of St. Paul Island, Alaska. She spent her formative years living in Pennsylvania. Tuck graduated in 2001 with her Bachelor of Arts in writing and education studies from Eugene Lang College The New School for Liberal Arts. In 2008 Tuck received her Doctor of Philosophy in Urban Education from The Graduate Center, City University of New York.

From 2011 to 2012 Tuck held a Ford Foundation Postdoctoral Fellowship. During the fellowship her work focused on Indigenous research ethics. In 2015 Tuck was selected as a William T. Grant Foundation Scholar (2015-2020). Her project for this $350,000 grant is titled "Migrant Youth, Deferred Action and Postsecondary Outcomes." In addition to her research work during this time Tuck was an Associate Professor in the department of Social Justice Education at the University of Toronto's Ontario Institute For Studies in Education. She also sat on the University of Toronto's Truth and Reconciliation Commission Steering Committee.

In 2017 Tuck was awarded a Tier 2 Canada Research Chair in Indigenous Methodologies with Youth and Communities at the Ontario Institute For Studies in Education.

== Professional activities ==
From 2015-2019, Tuck was Co-Editor of Critical Ethnic Studies, a journal published by the University of Minnesota Press. She is also the co-editor of the Indigenous and Decolonizing Studies in Education book series published by Routledge. Tuck shared or shares both of these editorial positions with K. Wayne Yang.

Tuck has also held numerous positions with the American Educational Research Association including: program co-chair of curriculum studies (2015-2017), positions on the executive committee, and the Indigenous Peoples of the Americas Special Interest Group.

In partnership with K. Wayne Yang, Eve Tuck is the co-founder of the Land Relationships Super Collective. This grassroots community based collective aims to provide a support network for those engaged in land-based collaboration and decolonization work. Similar to her work with the Lands Relationships Super Collective Tuck has been active in the Ogimaa Mikana Project since 2013. The Ogimaa Mikana Project is an initiative to replace street signs in Toronto, Ontario with Indigenous place names, raising awareness about stolen land, Indigenous history, and decolonization.

Tuck is also one of the founders and creators of The Henceforward podcast which examines the relationships between Indigenous and Black peoples in North America. Tuck has involved her graduate students in the production and hosting of the show. In October 2023, Tuck visited Melbourne Law School for a live seminar recorded as part of the White Noise podcast with Dr. Eddie Cubillo, an Indigenous Australian scholar and lawyer. Tuck brought perspectives from her own community into conversation with Australian Indigenous experiences.

At the University of Toronto, Tuck has worked to organize community events and make spaces more welcoming for Indigenous students. Tuck is also the co-creator of the Citation Practices Challenge, which encourages scholars to think critically about the politics of citation.

== Awards ==
- Early Career Award, Committee of Scholars of Color on Education, American Educational Research Association (2014)
- Outstanding Book Award, Qualitative Research Special Interest Group, American Educational Research Association (2013)
- Critics Choice Book Award, American Educational Studies Association (2013)
- Exemplary Paper Award, American Education and Literary Special Interest group, American Educational Research Association (2012)
- Writing Fellows Dissertation Scholarship, City University of New York (2006-2008)
