= International framework of sexual violence =

The term international framework of sexual violence refers to the collection of international legal instruments – such as treaties, conventions, protocols, case law, declarations, resolutions and recommendations – developed in the 20th and 21st century to address the problem of sexual violence. The framework seeks to establish and recognise the right of all human beings (especially but not only women) to not experience sexual violence, to prevent sexual violence from being committed wherever possible, to punish perpetrators of sexual violence, and to provide care for victims of sexual violence. The standards set by this framework are intended to be adopted and implemented by governments around the world in order to protect their citizens against sexual violence.

Even though international humanitarian law (IHL) strongly prohibits sexual violence in all armed conflicts and international human rights law (IHRL) and international customary law strongly prohibit it at all times, enforcement mechanisms are fragile or do not exist in many parts of the world. Acts of sexual violence can be charged as a crime against humanity, genocide, war crime, or grave breach of the Geneva Conventions.

== Background ==
Sexual violence includes, but is not limited to, rape. Although there is no agreed upon definition of sexual violence, commonly applied ones encompass any act of a sexual nature or attempt to obtain a sexual act carried out through coercion. Sexual violence also includes physical and psychological violence directed at a person's sexuality, including unwanted comments or advances, or acts of traffic such as forced prostitution or sexual slavery.

Sexual violence, in times of peace and armed conflict situations, is widespread and considered to be one of the most traumatic, pervasive, and most common violations human beings suffer. It is a serious public health and human rights problem and has profound short- and long- term impacts on physical and mental health. Though women and girls suffer disproportionately from this kind of violence, it can occur to anybody at any age. It is also an act of violence that can be perpetrated by parents, caregivers, acquaintances, and strangers, as well as intimate partners. Sexual violence is rarely a crime of passion; it is an aggressive act that frequently aims to express power and dominance over the victim.

Sexual violence remains highly stigmatized in all settings; thus, levels of disclosure of the assault vary between regions. In general, it is widely under-reported; thus, available data tend to underestimate the true scale of the problem. In addition, sexual violence is also a neglected area of research; thus, deeper understanding of the issue is needed to promote a coordinated movement against it. It is important to distinguish between domestic sexual violence and conflict-related sexual violence. Often, people who coerce their spouses into sexual acts believe their actions are legitimate because they are married. In times of conflict, sexual violence tends to be an inevitable repercussion of warfare trapped in an ongoing cycle of impunity. Rape is often used as a weapon of war, as a form of attack on the enemy, typifying the conquest and degradation of its women or men or captured fighters of any gender.

== International humanitarian law ==
In no other area is our collective failure to ensure effective protection for civilians more apparent – and by its very nature more shameful – than in terms of the masses of women and girls, but also boys and men, whose lives are destroyed each year by sexual violence perpetrated in conflict.

— Ban Ki-moon

References to sexual offences and violence provided in IHL instruments are only partially expressed in the 1949 Geneva Conventions, and even more vaguely considered in the 1977 Additional Protocols. By prohibiting sexual violence in a non-discriminatory manner, international humanitarian law ensures that women are protected through a two-tiered approach, being covered by general (equal protection as men) and specific protections. IHL mandates special protections to women, according to their additional needs in situations in which they find themselves more vulnerable, for example women who are widows, sick and wounded, migrants, internally displaced, or held in detention.

Instrument	Relevant provisions	Relevant citations or additional information
Customary law	Rule 93	State practice establishes prohibition of rape and other forms of sexual violence as a norm of customary international law.
Customary law	Rule 94	Under the Statute of the International Criminal Court, sexual slavery is a war crime in both international and non-international armed conflicts.
Customary law	Rule 134	The practice collected with regard to the specific needs of women is reinforced by and should be viewed in the light of the specific practice relating to the prohibition of sexual violence and the obligation to separate women deprived of their liberty from men, as well as the prominent place of women's rights in human rights law.
Customary law	Rule 156	Serious violations of international humanitarian law constitute war crimes. Sexual violence as a war crime.
Geneva Conventions of 1949	Common Article 3	(...) the following acts are and shall remain prohibited at any time and in any place whatsoever with respect to the above-mentioned persons: (a) violence to life and person, in particular murder of all kinds, mutilation, cruel treatment and torture; (...) (c) outrages upon personal dignity, in particular humiliating and degrading treatment; (...)
Geneva Convention relative to the Protection of Civilian Persons in Time of War	Article 27(2)	(...) inter alia (...) Women shall be especially protected against any attack on their honour, in particular against rape, enforced prostitution, or any form of indecent assault. (...) Without prejudice to the provisions relating to their state of health, age and sex, all protected persons shall be treated with the same consideration by the Party to the conflict in whose power they are, without any adverse distinction based, in particular, on race, religion or political opinion (...).
Additional Protocol I	Article 75(2) (b)	(...) outrages against personal dignity, in particular humiliating and degrading treatment, enforced prostitution and any other form of sexual assault (...)
Additional Protocol I	Article 76(1)	Women shall be the object of special respect and shall be protected in particular against rape, forced prostitution and any other form of indecent assault. (...)
Additional Protocol I	Article 77(1)	Children shall be the object of special respect and shall be protected against any form of indecent assault
Additional Protocol II	Article 4(2) (e)	Prohibition of outrages against personal dignity, in particular humiliating and degrading treatment, rape, enforced prostitution and any other form of indecent assault

== International criminal law ==
Rape and other forms of sexual violence that amount to serious violations of international humanitarian law entail individual criminal responsibility and must be prosecuted. All States are obliged to criminalize these violations under domestic law, and to effectively investigate and prosecute any instance of sexual violence.

— International Committee of the Red Cross (ICRC)

Although evidence of sexual atrocities such as mass rapes is acknowledged in the Nuremberg War Crimes Tribunal and Tokyo Tribunal, references to sexual violence in their respective charter are absent. Nonetheless, the International Criminal Tribunal for Rwanda (ICTR), the International Criminal Tribunal for former Yugoslavia (ICTY), the hybrid Special Court for Sierra Leone and the Extraordinary Chambers in the Courts of Cambodia consider sexual violence as a public tool of war rather than a private crime. Groundbreaking case law both by the ad hoc Tribunals of ICTR and ICTY established unprecedented developments by classifying acts of rape and sexual violence as crimes of genocide and crimes against humanity.

International Committee of the Red Cross provided clarification with Aide-memoire, the prohibition of rape under the Geneva Conventions of 1949. The issued statements cover the breach of willfully causing great suffering or serious injury to body or health, not only rape but also any other attack on a woman’s dignity. The Aide-memoire covers the legal breadth of prohibitions enumerated under Article 147.

The Akayesu case goes beyond domestic law definitions of sexual violence and is the first case in which sexual violence is perceived as an integral part of genocide as defined in the 1948 Convention on the Prevention and Punishment of the Crime of Genocide. On 2 September 1998, the International Criminal Tribunal for Rwanda (ICTR) found Jean-Paul Akayesu guilty of genocide and crimes against humanity, and "sexual violence" is cited more than 100 times in the judgment. The trial chamber also held that "sexual violence was an integral part of the process of destruction, specifically targeting Tutsi women and specifically contributing to their destruction and to the destruction of the Tutsi group as a whole".

The first trial solely focused on the perpetration of systematic sexual violence (rape camps) and on crimes against humanity committed against women and girls was in the Foca case, a ruling before the International Criminal Tribunal for former Yugoslavia (ICTY). The Statute of the International Criminal Court (ICC) also explicitly incorporates rape and other forms of sexual violence in the list of war crimes and therefore recognizes sexual violence as a grave breach of international humanitarian law and of the Geneva Conventions.

Instrument	Relevant provisions	Relevant citations or additional information
Statute of the International Criminal Tribunal for the former Yugoslavia (1993)	Article 5 (g)(i)	Article 5. Crimes against humanity The International Tribunal shall have the power to prosecute persons responsible for the following crimes when committed in armed conflict, whether international or internal in character, and directed against any civilian population (...) (g) rape (...) (i) other inhumane acts.
Statute of the International Criminal Tribunal for Rwanda (1994)	Article 3(g)(i)	Article 3. Crimes Against Humanity The International Tribunal for Rwanda shall have the power to prosecute persons responsible for the following crimes when committed as part of a widespread or systematic attack against any civilian population on national, political, ethnic, racial or religious grounds (...) (g) Rape (...) (i) Other inhumane acts (...)
Statute of the International Criminal Tribunal for Rwanda (1994)	Article 4(e)	Article 4. Violations of Article 3 Common to the Geneva Conventions and of Additional Protocol II The International Tribunal for Rwanda shall have the power to prosecute persons committing or ordering to be committed serious violations of Article 3 common to the Geneva Conventions of 12 August 1949 for the Protection of War Victims, and of Additional Protocol II thereto of 8 June 1977. These violations shall include, but shall not be limited to (...) (e) Outrages upon personal dignity, in particular humiliating and degrading treatment, rape, enforced prostitution and any form of indecent assault (...)
Rome Statute of the International Criminal Court (1998)	Article 7(2) (f)	Article 7. Crimes against humanity (...) Rape, sexual slavery, enforced prostitution, forced pregnancy (...) enforced sterilization, or any other form of sexual violence of comparable gravity” as crimes against humanity. The Statute defines “forced pregnancy” as the "unlawful confinement of a woman forcibly made pregnant, with the intent of affecting the ethnic composition of any population or carrying out other grave violations of international law”.
Rome Statute of the International Criminal Court (1998)	Article 8(2) (b) (xxi) (xxii)	Article 8. War crimes (b) Other serious violations of the laws and customs applicable in international armed conflict, within the established framework of international law, namely, any of the following acts: (...) (xxi) Committing outrages upon personal dignity, in particular humiliating and degrading treatment (xxii) Committing rape, sexual slavery, enforced prostitution, forced pregnancy, as defined in article 7, paragraph 2 (f), enforced sterilization, or any other form of sexual violence (...)
Rome Statute of the International Criminal Court (1998)	Article 8(2) (e) (vi)	Article 8. War crimes (e) Other serious violations of the laws and customs applicable in armed conflicts not of an international character, within the established framework of international law, namely, any of the following acts: (...) (vi) Committing rape, sexual slavery, enforced prostitution, forced pregnancy, as defined in article 7, paragraph 2 (f), enforced sterilization, and any other form of sexual violence also constituting a serious violation of article 3 common to the four Geneva Conventions (...)
Statute of the Special Court for Sierra Leone (2000)	Article 2(f)(g)(i)	Article 2. Crimes Against Humanity The Special Court shall have the power to prosecute persons who committed the following crimes as part of a widespread or systematic attack against any civilian population: (...) g. Rape, sexual slavery, enforced prostitution, forced pregnancy and any other form of sexual violence (...) i. Other inhumane acts.

== Human rights law, the United Nations, and further developments ==
=== International conventions and declarations ===
An extensive amount of both hard and soft law instruments set rules, standards and norms for the protection of victims of sexual offences. Among the wide range of international human rights law instruments are the following:

Short name	Full name	Relevance	Organisation	Adopted
DEDAW	Declaration on the Elimination of Discrimination Against Women	'[Combating] all forms of traffic in women and exploitation of prostitution of women' (Article 8)	United Nations	7 November 1967
CEDAW	Convention on the Elimination of All Forms of Discrimination against Women	'[Suppression of] all forms of traffic in women and exploitation of prostitution of women' (Article 6). According to CEDAW Committee Recommendation 19 (1992), 'the definition of discrimination includes gender-based violence, that is, violence that is directed against a woman because she is a woman or that affects women disproportionately.'	United Nations	18 December 1979
VDPA	Vienna Declaration and Programme of Action	'Gender-based violence and all forms of sexual harassment and exploitation (...) must be eliminated' (Part I §18)	United Nations	25 June 1993
DEVAW	Declaration on the Elimination of Violence Against Women	Detailed description of forms of sexual violence against women that are to be eliminated, and why, and how governments should ensure their elimination.	United Nations	20 December 1993
Belém do Pará Convention	Inter-American Convention on the Prevention, Punishment and Eradication of Violence Against Women	Definition of violence against women, which is deemed a human rights violation. First-ever call for binding mechanisms for defending women's right to be free from physical, sexual, and psychological violence.	Organization of American States	9 June 1994
Maputo Protocol	Protocol to the African Charter on Human and Peoples' Rights on the Rights of Women in Africa	First binding convention for Africa, first to define 'unwanted or forced sex' as forms of violence against women.	African Union	11 July 2003
Istanbul Convention	Convention on preventing and combating violence against women and domestic violence	First binding convention for Europe, first to define sexual violence in a gender-neutral manner, and based on a lack of consent.	Council of Europe	11 May 2011

Participation in CEDAW.
Signed and ratified
Acceded or succeeded
Unrecognised state, abiding by treaty
Only signed
Not signed

Participation in the Belém do Pará Convention, the Maputo Protocol and the Istanbul Convention combined.
Signed and ratified
Acceded or succeeded
Only signed
Not signed
Not a member state of the AU, CoE or OAS
Denounced

=== UN resolutions and reports ===
The continued engagement of the Security Council must serve as an unequivocal statement of intent: sexual violence in conflict will not be tolerated, and the full force of international order will be brought to bear to ensure accountability for such crimes.The perpetrators must understand that there can be no hiding place; no amnesty; no safe harbour. They must know that they will be pursued by any and all means at our collective disposal. In the process, we will begin to transfer the stigma of this crime from the survivors, to the perpetrators.

— Zainab Hawa Bangura

The UN Security Council, ECOSOC and the UN Commission on Human Rights do not take into account the nature of the conflict with respect to the protection of women in war time. List of UN Security Council Resolutions specifically address sexual violence:

1. UNSC Resolution 1325 (2000)
2. UNSC Resolution 1820 (2008)
3. UNSC Resolution 1888 (2009)
4. UNSC Resolution 1960 (2010)
5. UNSC Resolution 2106 (2013)
6. UNSC Resolution 2242 (2015)
7. UNSC Resolution 2331 (2016)
8. UNSC Resolution 2467 (2019)

Reports from the Secretary-General relate to sexual violence in conflict:

1. Report of the SG on the implementation of SC resolutions 1820 and 1888 (2010)
2. Report of the SG on conflict-related sexual violence (2012)
3. Report of the SG on conflict-related sexual violence (2013)
4. Report of the SG on conflict-related sexual violence (2014)
5. Report of the SG on conflict-related sexual violence (2015)
6. Report of the SG on conflict-related sexual violence (2016)
7. Report of the SG on conflict-related sexual violence (2017)
8. Report of the SG on conflict-related sexual violence (2018)
9. Report of the SG on conflict-related sexual violence (2019)
10. Report of the SG on conflict-related sexual violence (2020)
11. Report of the SG on conflict-related sexual violence (2021)
12. Report of the SG on conflict-related sexual violence (2022)

The first time the Security Council addressed the impacts of armed conflict on women was in Resolution 1325 (2000). The document focuses on the need for specific protections for women and girls in conflict and expresses the need to consider gender perspectives in mission, UN peace support operations, and post-conflict processes.

Resolution 1820 (2008) of the UN Security Council declares that rape and other forms of sexual violence "can constitute war crimes, crimes against humanity or a constitutive act with respect to genocide".

=== UN Special Representative on Sexual Violence in Conflict ===
What do the ten resolutions on Women, Peace and Security – five of which focus squarely on preventing and addressing conflict-related sexual violence mean right now?

— Pramila Patten, April 2022

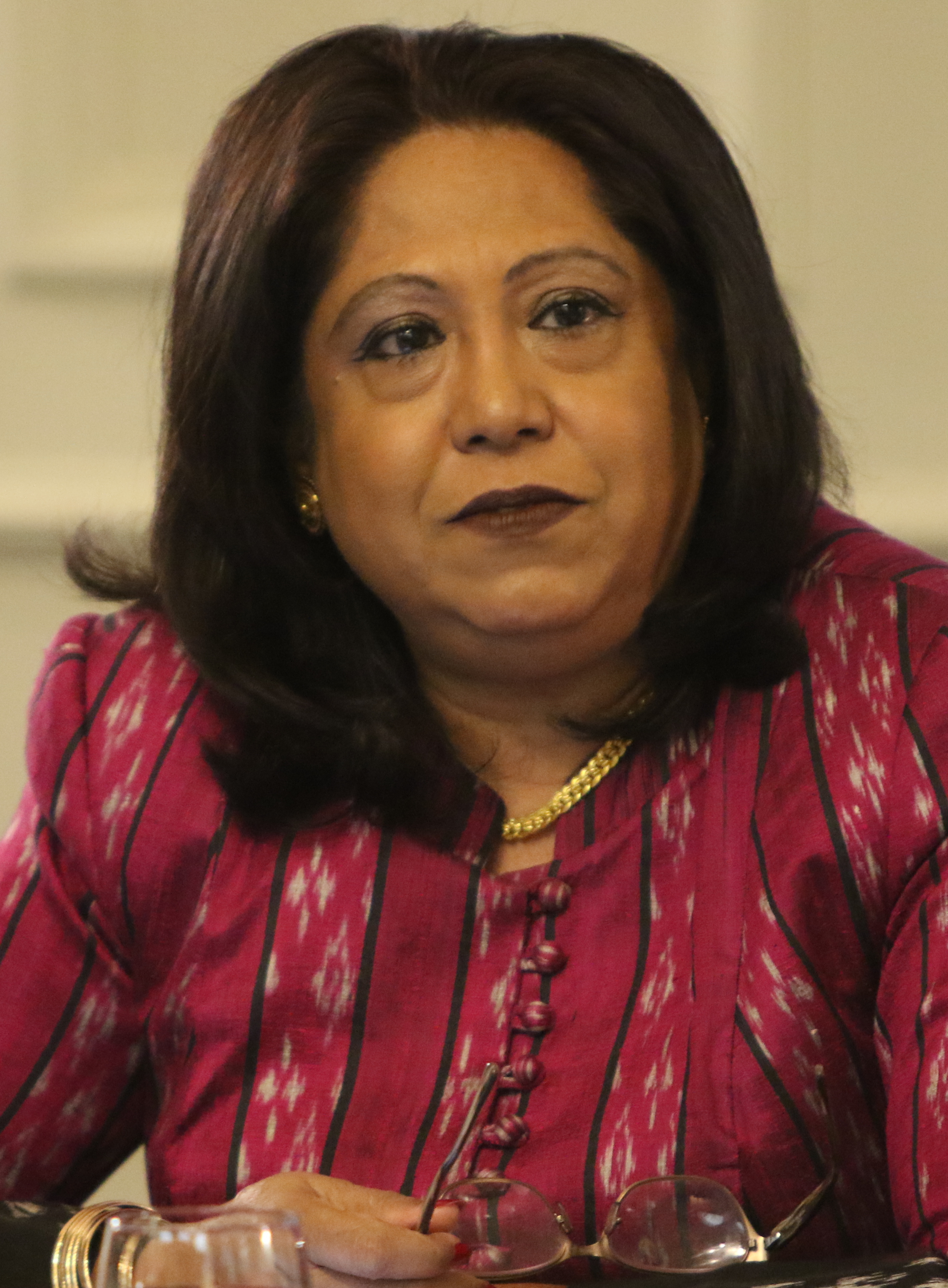
Pramila Patten, current UN Special Representative on Sexual Violence in Conflict

Resolution 1888 (2009) is perceived as an advancement in international law as it created the Office of the Special Representative of the Secretary General for Sexual Violence in Conflict (SRSG-SVC). The first Special Representative, Margot Wallström, was appointed in April 2010. The second Special Representative Zainab Hawa Bangura served in the position from September 2012 to April 2017, when the third Special Representative Pramila Patten took office. The Office identified eight priority countries: Bosnia and Herzegovina; Central African Republic (CAR); Colombia; Cote d’Ivoire; Democratic Republic of Congo (DRC); Liberia; South Sudan and Sudan. SRSG-SVC is also engaged in the Middle East (Syria) and in Asia and the Pacific (Cambodia).

Key priorities of the Office are:

1. to end impunity for sexual violence in conflict by assisting national authorities to strengthen criminal accountability, responsiveness to survivors and judicial capacity;
2. the protection and empowerment of civilians who face sexual violence in conflict, in particular, women and girls who are targeted disproportionately by this crime;
3. to mobilize political ownership by fostering government engagement in developing and implementing strategies to combat sexual violence;
4. to increase recognition of rape as a tactic and consequence of war through awareness-raising activities at the international and country levels;
5. to harmonise the UN's response by leading UN Action Against Sexual Violence in Conflict, a network of focal points from 13 UN agencies that amplify programming and advocacy on this issue in the wider UN agenda;
6. to emphasize greater national ownership.

Resolution 1960 (2010) reaffirms that sexual violence is systematic, rampant and widespread. The resolution creates new institutional tools for the prevention and protection from sexual violence. The aim of the resolution is to provide further steps for combating impunity and recognizing sexual violence as a serious breach of human rights law and international humanitarian law.

Resolution 2106 (2013) reasserts fundamental requirements for the prevention of sexual violence in conflict and post-conflict setting: gender equality, women empowerment, and the importance of implementing the full range of commitments found in resolution 1325.

== See also ==
- Comfort women
- Carla del Ponte
- Louise Arbour
- Marital rape laws by country
- Marry-your-rapist law
- Navi Pillay
- Office of the Special Representative of the Secretary-General on Sexual Violence in Conflict
- Rwandan genocide
- Forced conversion of minority girls in Pakistan
- Sexual slavery
- United Nations Special Rapporteur on Violence Against Women
- Wartime sexual violence
