= International Year of Indigenous Languages =

2019 United Nations observance focusing on the endangerment of Indigenous languages

- Observances: United Nations
- Duration: 1 year
- Related to: International Decade of Indigenous Languages; Declaration on the Rights of Indigenous Peoples; International Day of the World's Indigenous Peoples; International Mother Language Day

The International Year of Indigenous Languages was a United Nations observance in 2019 that aimed to raise awareness of the consequences of the endangerment of Indigenous languages across the world, with an aim to establish a link between language, development, peace, and reconciliation.

== History ==
On 19 December 2016 the United Nations General Assembly proclaimed 2019 as the International Year of Indigenous Languages based on a resolution of the UN Permanent Forum on Indigenous Issues (Resolution 71/178). The General Assembly resolution requested the United Nations Educational, Scientific and Cultural Organization (UNESCO) as the lead UN agency for coordination of the year.

== Aims ==
The International Year of Indigenous Languages aimed to focus attention on the risks confronting indigenous languages, especially those significant for development, reconciliation, good governance and peace building. It aimed to improve quality of life, wider international cooperation and visibility and strengthened intercultural dialogue to reaffirm the continuity of indigenous languages and cultures.

The year planned to carry out activities which took form in three thematic areas, encompassing both the 2010 Agenda for Sustainable Development and the 17 Sustainable Development Goals. Involvement in the year was available to indigenous peoples, UN system organisations, countries, academia, public and private bodies and the media. The thematic areas were:

- Supporting the revitalisation and maintenance of indigenous languages through: creation of more materials and content and a wider range of services, using language, information and communications technologies (Support)
- Preserving indigenous languages, creating access to education, information and knowledge in and about indigenous languages for indigenous children, young people and adults, improving the data collection and sharing of information (Access)
- Mainstreaming the knowledge areas and values of indigenous peoples and cultures within broader sociocultural, economic and political domains, as well as cultural practices such as traditional sports and games (Promotion).

The year had five main intervention areas:

1. Increasing understanding, reconciliation and international cooperation
2. Creation of favourable conditions for knowledge-sharing and dissemination of good practices with regard to indigenous languages
3. Integration of indigenous languages into standard-setting
4. Empowerment through capacity-building
5. Growth and development through elaboration of new knowledge

== See also ==
- International Decade of Indigenous Languages
- Declaration on the Rights of Indigenous Peoples
- International Day of the World's Indigenous Peoples
- International Mother Language Day
- Language revitalization
- Endangered language
- Lists of endangered languages
