= Istanbul Convention =

2011 Council of Europe convention based on domestic violence

Council of Europe Convention on Preventing and Combating Violence Against Women and Domestic Violence
Signed and ratified (Note: 1. The European Union is also a signatory and a ratifier.)
Signed, not in force
Not signed (CoE member states) (Note: Includes non-CoE states that were involved in elaborating the Convention; none of them (Canada, the Holy See (Vatican City), Japan, Mexico, Russia, and the United States) has so far signed the Convention.)
Former party
Not signed (non-CoE states)
- Drafted: 7 April 2011
- Signed: 11 May 2011
- Location: Istanbul, Turkey
- Effective: 1 August 2014
- Condition: 10 ratifications of which 8 from Council of Europe members
- Signatories: 45 states + EU
- Ratifiers: 39 states + EU
- Depositary: Secretary General of the Council of Europe
- Citations: CETS No. 210
- Languages: English and French

The Council of Europe Convention on Preventing and Combating Violence Against Women and Domestic Violence, better known as the Istanbul Convention, is a human rights treaty of the Council of Europe opposing violence against women and domestic violence which was opened for signature on 11 May 2011, in Istanbul, Turkey. The convention aims at prevention of violence, victim protection and to end the impunity of perpetrators.

As of March 2019, it has been signed by 45 countries and the European Union. On 12 March 2012, Turkey became the first country to ratify the convention, followed by 37 other countries and the European Union from 2013 to 2024 (Albania, Andorra, Austria, Belgium, Bosnia and Herzegovina, Croatia, Cyprus, Denmark, Estonia, Finland, France, Georgia, Germany, Greece, Iceland, Ireland, Italy, Latvia, Liechtenstein, Luxembourg, Malta, Moldova, Monaco, Montenegro, the Netherlands, North Macedonia, Norway, Poland, Portugal, Romania, San Marino, Serbia, Slovenia, Spain, Sweden, Switzerland, Ukraine, United Kingdom). The Convention came into force on 1 August 2014.

In 2021, Turkey became the first and only country to withdraw from the convention, after denouncing it on 20 March 2021. The convention ceased to be effective in Turkey on 1 July 2021, following its denunciation.

On 1 June 2023 the Council of the European Union approved the EU's accession to the Istanbul Convention. On 28 June 2023 the European Union ratified the Council of Europe Convention on preventing and combating violence against women and domestic violence (CETS No. 210), known as the "Istanbul Convention". The Istanbul Convention entered into force in the EU on 1 October 2023, where the "EU member states that have not yet ratified the convention themselves will only be bound by the EU acquis, which implements the convention".

== History ==
CoE official Johanna Nelles on the convention's purpose (June 2011)

The Council of Europe has undertaken a series of initiatives to promote the protection of women against violence since the 1990s. In particular, these initiatives have resulted in the adoption, in 2002, of the Council of Europe Recommendation Rec(2002)5 of the Committee of Ministers to member states on the protection of women against violence, and the running of a Europe-wide campaign, from 2006 to 2008, to combat violence against women, including domestic violence. The Parliamentary Assembly of the Council of Europe has also taken a firm political stance against all forms of violence against women. It has adopted a number of resolutions and recommendations calling for legally-binding standards on preventing, protecting against and prosecuting the most severe and widespread forms of gender-based violence.

National reports, studies and surveys revealed the magnitude of the problem in Europe. The campaign in particular showed a large variation in Europe of national responses to violence against women and domestic violence. Thus, the need for harmonized legal standards to ensure that victims benefit from the same level of protection everywhere in Europe became apparent. The Ministers of Justice of Council of Europe member states began discussing the need to step up protection from domestic violence, in particular intimate partner violence.

The Council of Europe decided it was necessary to set comprehensive standards to prevent and combat violence against women and domestic violence. In December 2008, the Committee of Ministers set up an expert group mandated to prepare a draft convention in this field. Over the course of just over two years, this group, called the CAHVIO (Ad Hoc Committee for preventing and combating violence against women and domestic violence), developed a draft text. During the later stage of drafting of the convention, UK, Italy, Russia, and the Holy See proposed several amendments to limit the requirements provided by the convention. These amendments were criticized by Amnesty International. The final draft of the convention was produced in December 2010.

== Main provisions ==
Summary of the convention's key issues

The Istanbul Convention is the first legally-binding instrument which claims to create "a comprehensive legal framework and approach to combat violence against women" and is focused on preventing domestic violence, protecting victims and prosecuting accused offenders.

It characterizes violence against women as a violation of human rights and a form of discrimination (Art.3(a)). Countries should exercise due diligence when preventing violence, protecting victims and prosecuting perpetrators (Art. 5). The convention also contains a definition of gender: for the purpose of the Convention gender is defined in Article 3(c) as "the socially constructed roles, behaviours, activities and attributes that a given society considers appropriate for women and men". Moreover, the treaty establishes a series of offences characterized as violence against women and provides protective measures such as specialist support services (Art. 22) and shelters (Art.23) for women and their children. States which ratify the Convention must criminalize several offences, including: psychological violence (Art.33); stalking (Art.34); physical violence (Art.35); sexual violence, including rape, explicitly covering all engagement in non-consensual acts of a sexual nature with a person (Art.36), forced marriage (Art.37); female genital mutilation (Art.38), forced abortion and forced sterilisation (Art.39). The Convention states that sexual harassment must be subject to "criminal or other legal sanction" (Art. 40). The convention also includes an article targeting crimes committed in the name of "so-called honour" (Art. 42).

=== Structure ===
Clickable English language version of the Istanbul Convention

The convention contains 81 articles separated into 12 chapters. Its structure follows the structure of the Council of Europe's most recent conventions. The structure of the instrument is based on the "four Ps": Prevention, Protection and support of victims, Prosecution of offenders and Integrated Policies. Each area foresees a series of specific measures. The convention also establishes obligations in relation to the collection of data and supporting research in the field of violence against women (Art. 11).

The preamble recalls the European Convention on Human Rights, European Social Charter and Convention on Action against Trafficking in Human Beings as well as international human rights treaties by United Nations and Rome Statute of the International Criminal Court. In Article 2, this Convention indicates that the provisions shall apply in time of peace and also in situations of armed conflicts in violence against women and domestic violence. Article 3 defines key terms:

- "violence against women" is "violation of human rights and a form of discrimination against women and shall mean all acts of gender-based violation that result in, or are likely to result in physical, sexual, psychological, or economic harm or suffering to women including threats of such acts, coercion or arbitrary deprivation of liberty, whether occurring in public or private life",
- "domestic violence": "all acts of physical, sexual, psychological or economic violence that occur with the family or domestic unit or between former or current spouses or partners, whether or not the perpetrator shares or has shared the same residence with the victim."
- "gender": means "the socially constructed roles, behaviours, activities and attributes that a given society considers appropriate for women and men."
- "gender-based violence against women": means "violence that is directed against a woman because she is a woman or that affects women disproportionately."

Article 4 prohibits several types of discrimination stating: The implementation of the provisions of this convention by the Parties, in particular measure to protect the rights of victims, shall be secured without discrimination on any ground such as sex, gender, race, colour, language political or other opinion, national or social origin, association with a national minority, property, birth, sexual orientation, gender identity, age, state of health, disability, marital status, migrant or refugee status, or other status.

=== Monitoring mechanism GREVIO ===
The convention mandates an independent expert body, the Group of Experts on Action against Violence against Women and Domestic Violence (GREVIO), with monitoring the implementation of the convention. Its members are elected by the state parties; depending on the number of state parties the body consists of between ten and fifteen members.

The first ten members were elected in 2014: President Feride Acar (Turkey), First Vice-president Marceline Naudi (Malta), Second Vice-president Simona Lanzoni (Italy), and members Biljana Brankovic (Serbia), Françoise Brie (France), Gemma Gallego (Spain), Helena Leitao (Portugal), Rosa Logar (Austria), Iris Luarasi (Albania) and Vesna Ratkovic (Montenegro).

Five additional members were elected in 2018: Per Arne Håkansson (Sweden), Sabine Kräuter-Stockton (Germany), Vladimer Mkervalishvili (Georgia), Rachel Eapen Paul (Norway) and Aleid van den Brink (Netherlands).

With several GREVIO members finishing their mandates, new elections were held in December 2023.

== Adoption, signature, ratification and denunciation ==
=== General process ===
The draft of the convention was adopted by the Council of Europe Ministers Deputies on 7 April 2011 on the occasion of the 1111th meeting. It opened for signature on 11 May 2011 on the occasion of the 121st Session of the Committee of Ministers in Istanbul. It entered into force following 10 ratifications, eight of which were required to be member states of the Council of Europe. As of December 2015, the convention was signed by 39 states, followed by ratification of the minimum eight Council of Europe states: Albania, Austria, Bosnia and Herzegovina, Italy, Montenegro, Portugal, Serbia, and Turkey. Later that year, it was ratified by Andorra, Denmark, France, Malta, Monaco, Spain, and Sweden. In 2015, it was ratified also by Finland, the Netherlands, Poland and Slovenia, and in 2016, by Belgium, San Marino and Romania; in 2017 by Cyprus, Estonia, Georgia, Germany, Norway, and Switzerland, in 2018 by Croatia, Greece, Iceland, Luxembourg and Republic of Macedonia, and in 2019, by Ireland. On 13 June 2017, European Commissioner Věra Jourová (Gender Equality) signed the Istanbul Convention on behalf of the European Union. On 20 June 2022 the Ukrainian parliament ratified the treaty, followed in July 2022 by the United Kingdom. States that have ratified the convention are legally bound by its provisions once it enters into force.

28 June 2023 saw the European Union ratify the Council of Europe Convention on preventing and combating violence against women and domestic violence (CETS No. 210), known as the “Istanbul Convention”. The convention cane into force in respect of the European Union as of 1 October 2023.

The convention can be denounced through a notification to the COE Secretary General (Article 80) and enters into force three months after that notification.

Liri Kopachi (Note: At the time of this lecture, April 2014, Liri Kopachi was the Head of the Equality Division of the Council of Europe. As she correctly predicted, the Convention entered into force shortly after in August 2014.) on the convention's background and ratification process (2014)

MEP Terry Reintke urging the EU to accede the convention (2017) (Note: There is an error in the video's subtitles as well as in the transcript of this debate on the 'EU accession to the Council of Europe Convention on preventing and combating violence against women and domestic violence' (held on 11 September 2017 in the European Parliament in Strasbourg). As the context indicates, Reintke meant 'to accede', not 'to exceed'; the words are homophones. Similarly, Reintke meant 'forefighters' (meaning 'champions' or 'soldiers who fight in the frontline'), not 'four fighters'.)

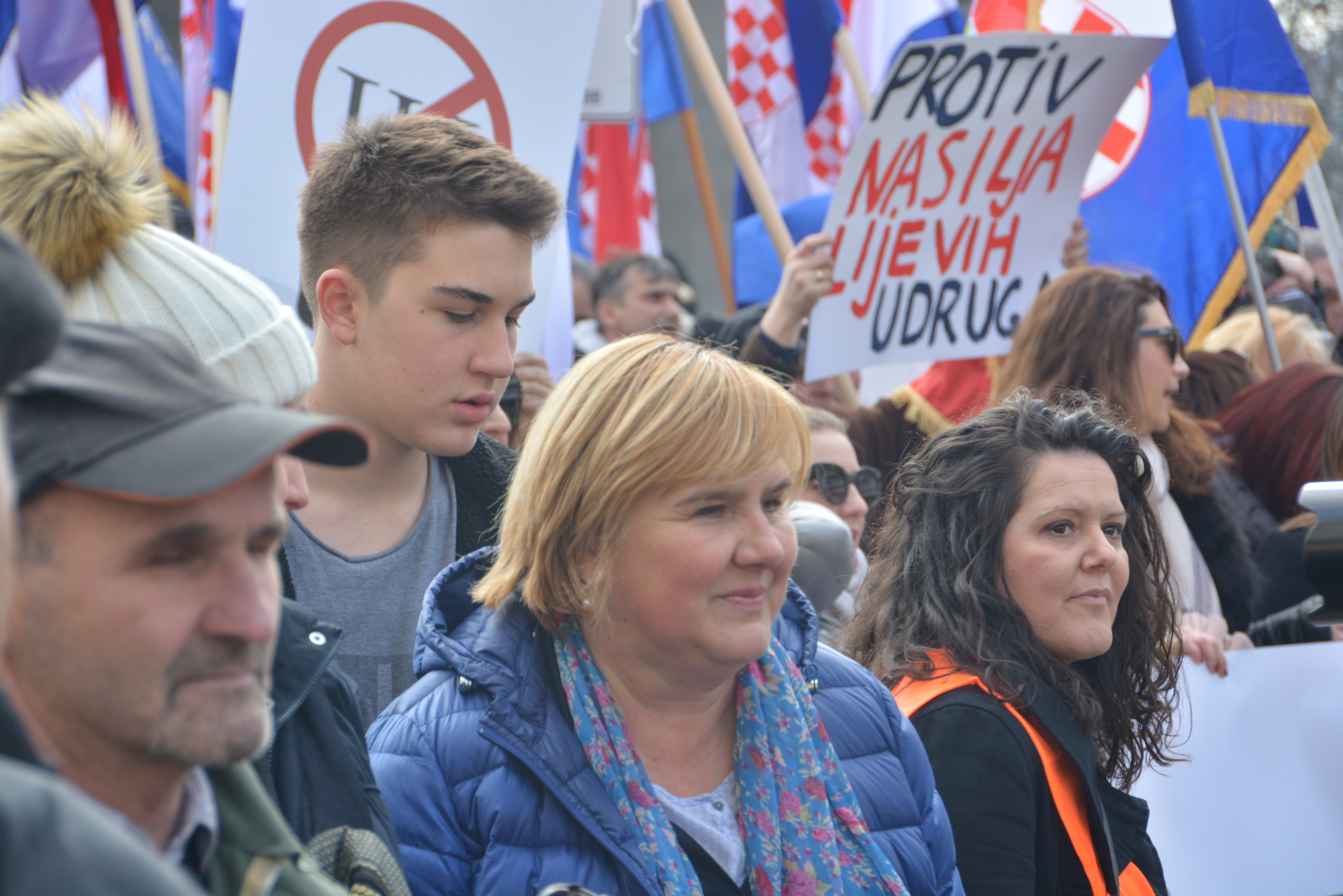
Željka Markić and others urging Croatia not to ratify the convention (2018)

Signatory	Signature	Ratification	Entry into force	Denunciation
Albania	19 December 2011	4 February 2013	1 August 2014	
Andorra	22 February 2013	22 April 2014	1 August 2014	
Armenia	18 January 2018			
Austria	11 May 2011	14 November 2013	1 August 2014	
Belgium	11 September 2012	14 March 2016	1 July 2016	
Bosnia and Herzegovina	8 March 2013	7 November 2013	1 August 2014	
Bulgaria	21 April 2016			
Croatia	22 January 2013	12 June 2018	1 October 2018	
Cyprus	16 June 2015	10 November 2017	1 March 2018	
Czech Republic	2 May 2016			
Denmark (Note: The Convention does not apply to the Faroe Islands and Greenland.)	11 October 2013	23 April 2014	1 August 2014	
Estonia	2 December 2014	26 October 2017	1 February 2018	
European Union	13 June 2017	1 June 2023	1 October 2023	
Finland	11 May 2011	17 April 2015	1 August 2015	
France	11 May 2011	4 July 2014	1 November 2014	
Georgia	19 June 2014	19 May 2017	1 September 2017	
Germany	11 May 2011	12 October 2017	1 February 2018	
Greece	11 May 2011	18 June 2018	1 October 2018	
Hungary	14 March 2014			
Iceland	11 May 2011	26 April 2018	1 August 2018	
Ireland	15 November 2015	8 March 2019	1 July 2019	
Italy	27 September 2012	10 September 2013	1 August 2014	
Latvia	18 May 2016	10 January 2024	1 May 2024	
Liechtenstein	10 November 2016	17 June 2021	1 October 2021	
Lithuania	7 June 2013			
Luxembourg	11 May 2011	7 August 2018	1 December 2018	
Malta	21 May 2012	29 July 2014	1 November 2014	
Moldova	6 February 2017	31 January 2022	1 May 2022	
Monaco	20 September 2012	7 October 2014	1 February 2015	
Montenegro	11 May 2011	22 April 2013	1 August 2014	
Netherlands (Note: The Convention does not apply to the Caribbean Netherlands or to the other countries of the Dutch Caribbean, only to the European part of the Kingdom of the Netherlands.)	14 November 2012	18 November 2015	1 March 2016	
North Macedonia	8 July 2011	23 March 2018	1 July 2018	
Norway	7 July 2011	5 July 2017	1 November 2017	
Poland	18 December 2012	27 April 2015	1 August 2015	
Portugal	11 May 2011	5 February 2013	1 August 2014	
Romania	27 June 2014	23 May 2016	1 September 2016	
San Marino	30 April 2014	28 January 2016	1 May 2016	
Serbia	4 April 2012	21 November 2013	1 August 2014	
Slovakia	11 May 2011			
Slovenia	8 September 2011	5 February 2015	1 June 2015	
Spain	11 May 2011	10 April 2014	1 August 2014	
Sweden	11 May 2011	1 July 2014	1 November 2014	
Switzerland	11 September 2013	14 December 2017	1 April 2018	
Turkey	11 May 2011	14 March 2012	1 August 2014	1 July 2021
Ukraine	7 November 2011	18 July 2022	1 November 2022	
United Kingdom	8 June 2012	21 July 2022	1 November 2022	

=== Countries still to ratify convention ===
==== Armenia ====
The Armenian government approved the signing of the Convention in the session of 28 December 2017. In 2019, during the public discussions about the approval of the convention, there were opinions both for and against. A number of politicians and statesmen have stated that it contradicts the Constitution of Armenia and could result in the idea of having a third gender. On 1 August 2019, the Deputy Minister Kristinne Grigoryan of the Armenian Ministry of Justice released a clarifying statement on the convention, remarking that its purpose is the prevention of violence and not the redefinition of the family. The ministry also announced that it had sought guidance from the Venice Commission, a Council of Europe body that advises on legal and constitutional issues, on the "constitutional implications" of the ratification of the convention. Assuming that the Venice Commission rules favorably, Armenia's ratification appears inevitable given the fact that an overwhelming majority of members of parliament support it.

Discussions surrounding the ratification were also met with opposition from some members of the public, who accused the convention to be intended to legalize same-sex marriage and spread LGBT "propaganda". According to Human Rights Watch, some officials used derogatory and hateful words against LGBT activists as a result. The Armenian Apostolic Church issued a statement opposing ratification on the grounds that the convention recognized rights for transgender individuals.

The United Nations Human Rights Council in its 2020 in the report urged Armenia to immediately ratify the Istanbul Convention to effectively protect the well-being of women who experience domestic violence, but also men, complaining of insufficient protection for both in existing Armenian legislation. In November 2022, the European Union's ambassador to Armenia, Andrea Wiktorin, urged the Armenian government to speed up proceedings to ratify the convention.

==== Bulgaria ====
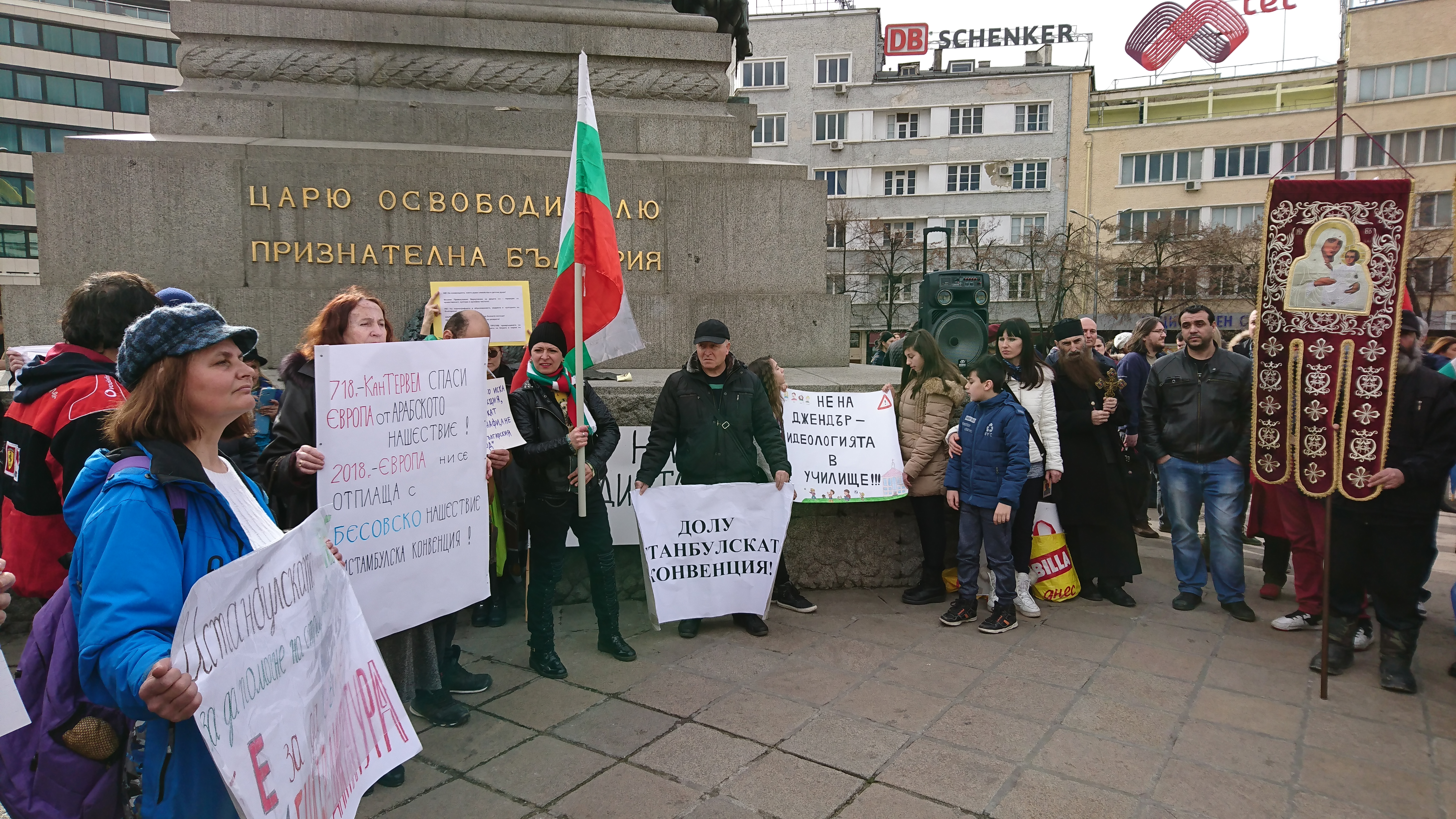
Protest against the Istanbul Convention in Sofia (February 2018)

Counter-protest in favour of the Istanbul Convention in Sofia (November 2018)

In January 2018, the Council of Ministers of Bulgaria adopted a proposal to the Parliament to ratify the convention. The decision was quickly condemned by some government ministers, members of parliament, media groups and civic organisations, who suggested that the convention would eventually lead to a formal recognition of a third gender and same-sex marriage. After widespread backlash, the third Borisov Government postponed the ratification and transferred the decision to the Constitutional Court, which would rule whether it would be legal. President Rumen Radev, an opponent of the ratification, hailed the postponement as a "triumph of common sense", stating that the convention is ambiguous and that domestic violence can only be addressed by adequate Bulgarian laws and improved law enforcement.

Prime Minister Boyko Borisov cited the isolation of his GERB party, which was not supported even by its coalition partner, the far-right United Patriots. Borisov expressed surprise that the opposition Bulgarian Socialist Party (BSP) was firmly against the convention as well, and suggested that the Socialists are opposing the European Union altogether. The BSP declared itself firmly against the convention, causing a rift between the Party of European Socialists and the BSP's new political line under Korneliya Ninova. According to the Socialists' "Vision for Bulgaria" programme, the convention is "not meant to protect women. The convention is against fundamental values of European civilisation".

On 27 July 2018, the Constitutional Court pronounced Resolution No 13 on Constitutional Case No. 3/2018 stating that "the Council of Europe Convention on preventing and combating violence against women and domestic violence, does not comply with the Constitution of the Republic of Bulgaria". In its decision, the Court identified a relation between previous Council of Europe documents against domestic violence and the expansion of transgender rights. According to the Constitutional Court, the convention offers a binary interpretation of gender as both a biological and social category, which contradicts the constitution of Bulgaria, where humans are irrevocably defined as biologically male or female, with equal standing as citizens. The convention therefore lays formal ground to promote non-biological definitions of gender, which are deemed unconstitutional.

Women's rights groups were outraged by the Bulgarian government's decision not to ratify the Istanbul Convention. In November 2018, on the occasion of the International Day for the Elimination of Violence against Women, hundreds of people demonstrated in the centre of Sofia against violence against women under the motto #YouAreNotAlone (#НеСиСама), demanding effective action from the institutions including the creation of prevention programmes and shelters for victims. The organisers, the Bulgarian Fund for Women, cited the fact that in the first eleven months of 2018, almost 30 women were killed in Bulgaria, most of them by their partners.

==== Czechia ====
The League of Human Rights (a Czech organization part of the International Federation for Human Rights) and the Czech Women's Lobby together with several other smaller organizations (proFem, Czech Women's Union, Rosa) advocated for the adoption of the convention. The adoption of the convention was also supported for a long time by the former Minister for Human Rights, Equal Opportunities and Legislation, Jiří Dienstbier, who in January 2016 accepted a petition by Amnesty International for its adoption on behalf of the government. The Czech Republic finally signed the treaty on 12 May 2016, one of the last EU countries to do so. The signature was joined by its ambassador to the Council of Europe, Emil Ruffer. According to the plans, the ratification of the treaty itself was to take place by mid-2018. However, neither the first nor the second government of Andrej Babiš discussed its ratification. The government of Petr Fiala, on the other hand, postponed negotiations on the ratification of the convention, according to the Minister of Justice Pavel Blažek, to the end of January 2023.

In June 2023, the government agreed to continue the process of adopting the convention. Government Commissioner for Human Rights Klára Šimáčková Laurenčíková stated that the cabinet approved the convention for ratification.

In January 2024 it was rejected by Senate because it was labeled as "ideology document which does not help anyone".

==== Hungary ====
In May 2020, the National Assembly adopted a political declaration in which it called on the government not to go any further in acceding to the convention and to lobby the European Union to do the same. The declaration was adopted with 115 votes in favour, 35 against and three abstentions. Following the 2026 change of government, Prime Minister Péter Magyar pledged to ratify the convention.

==== Lithuania ====
The Cabinet of Ministers of Lithuania initially signed the Convention on June 6, 2013. The Social Democratic Party of Lithuania welcomed the move, with Giedrė Purvaneckienė stating it will strengthen already existing laws in the country on violence against women. On the other hand, the move was strongly protested by conservative groups, with MP Rimantas Dagys stating the decision was taken without consultations with the public.

Ratification of the Convention stalled however, with subsequent majorities in the Seimas not carrying it through. In 2021, speaker of the Seimas Viktorija Čmilytė-Nielsen brought renewed attention to the ratification process, but opposition remained within the Seimas, and the issue was once again postponed. In June 2023, the Constitutional Court of Lithuania was asked by Viktorija Čmilytė-Nielsen to review the convention and verify if it abides to the constitution of the country. Frederikas Jansonas, chief advisor to Lithuanian President Gitanas Nausėda, described this move as unnecessary and claimed the President believes the Seimas is ready to deliberate and vote on this issue in the near future.

==== Slovakia ====
Conservative, Christian democratic, Roman Catholic, nationalist and far-right groups and parties in Slovakia have been opposed to the country ratifying the convention, especially because of its clauses concerning LGBT rights, which they portrayed as "extreme liberalism" that corrodes "traditional values" they felt needed to be protected.

On 29 March 2019, one day before the 2019 Slovak presidential election, nationalist politicians forced through a parliamentary resolution asking Slovakia's government not to ratify the Istanbul Convention, in an effort to mobilise conservative voters to vote for Maroš Šefčovič instead of the progressive candidate Zuzana Čaputová, who had been supporting LGBT rights and women's right to abortion. Although Čaputová won the election and became Slovakia's first female president, conservative groups stepped up their campaign to prevent Slovakia from ratifying the convention and restricting access to abortion in the following months. On 25 February 2020, the Parliament of Slovakia, the National Council, rejected the Convention at an extraordinary session by a vote of 17–96 (37 absent).

Following the decision of Parliament, President Zuzana Čaputová sent a letter to the Council of Europe on 6 March 2020, informing it that the Slovak Republic could not become a party to the Istanbul Convention. Presidential spokesperson Martin Strižinec commented: "Since the necessary condition to ratify the convention is the consent of Parliament, but this hasn't happened, this convention won't be ratified by the president," adding that Čaputová repeatedly stated that if Parliament decided on the document in a constitutionally prescribed manner, she would respect the will of its members.

=== Denunciation of convention by Turkey ===
On 20 March 2021, Turkish President Recep Tayyip Erdoğan announced his country's withdrawal from the convention by a presidential decree published in the Official Gazette of the Republic of Turkey. The notification for withdrawal has been reported to the Secretary-General by Turkey on 22 March 2021 and the Secretary-General has announced that denunciation will enter into force on 1 July 2021. The withdrawal has been criticized both domestically and internationally, including by the opposition parties in the country, foreign leaders, the Council of Europe, NGOs and on social media. The CoE Secretary-General Marija Pejčinović Burić described the decision as "devastating news" and a "huge setback" that compromises the protection of women in Turkey and abroad. A spokesperson of the Republican People's Party (CHP) claimed that the agreement cannot be withdrawn without parliamentary approval, since it was approved by parliament on 24 November 2011. According to the CHP and various lawyers, the right to approve the withdrawal belongs to the parliament according to Article 90 of the Constitution. However, the government claims that the president has the authority to withdraw from international agreements as stated in article 3 of the presidential decree no. 9. The decision sparked protests across Turkey and came at a time when domestic violence against women and femicides in the country were soaring. US President Joe Biden described the move as "deeply disappointing", while the EU's foreign policy chief Josep Borrell urged the authorities to reverse the decision. In an official statement, the Turkish Presidency blamed the LGBT community for the withdrawal from the convention, arguing that "the Istanbul Convention, originally intended to promote women's rights, was hijacked by a group of people attempting to normalize homosexuality – which is incompatible with Turkey's social and family values. Hence, the decision to withdraw." That view is shared by conservative groups and officials from Erdoğan's Islamic-oriented ruling party, the Justice and Development Party (AKP), who claim that the agreement is promoting homosexuality, encouraging divorce and undermining what constitutes a "sacred" family in their view. Answering to criticism over the legality of withdrawal by the Presidency instead of Parliament, Erdoğan insisted that the withdrawal was "completely legal".

On 29 June, the Council of State rejected a motion for stay of execution regarding Erdogan's sole decision to withdraw from the Istanbul Convention on violence against women and ruled that it was legal for Erdoğan to withdraw the country out of the convention since the authority to ratify and annul international agreements was among the president's powers, according to Article 104 of the constitution.

=== Denunciation of convention by Latvia ===
Latvia signed the Istanbul Convention on 18 May 2016, represented by Minister of Welfare Jānis Reirs. The Saeima ratified the convention on 30 November 2023.

On 25 September 2025, the Saeima voted 55 in favor and 33 opposed to begin the process of withdrawing Latvia from the convention, with supporters arguing it had become an ideological instrument rather than an effective tool against violence. They contended that resources could be better directed toward national programs addressing domestic violence and social issues instead of policies driven by external frameworks.

On 9 October 2025, the Saeima voted 79 in favor and 8 opposed to advance an alternative declaration on preventing and combating violence against women and domestic violence, drafted by the National Alliance, United List, and the Union of Greens and Farmers. The declaration aims to create a national legal framework by March 2026, emphasizing practical measures and state responsibility. Only the Progressives opposed the initiative, drawing criticism for voting against a law designed to strengthen protection for victims of violence. While New Unity initially supported the declaration, in the final vote the party didn’t participate in voting. Their deputy Zanda Kalniņa-Lukaševica stated that New Unity did not want to "create the illusion that the declaration proposed by MEPs could be an equivalent alternative to an international convention" and stated that declaration doesn't have the force of law. The Progressives stated that the reason behind voting against declaration is that it "reduces protection against violence, controls, and attempts to distance Latvia from the European legal and value space". Leader of Progressive's parliamentary group Andris Šuvajevs stated: "The declaration should be viewed in conjunction with the process of denouncing the Istanbul Convention. When viewed together, it is clear that such a replacement of one document with another will narrow the rights of Latvian residents, especially victims of violence." National Alliance deputy Artūrs Butāns criticized the Progressives, saying they valued "social gender ideology over combating violence."

On October 23, majority of Latvian Parliament (52 MPs from the United List, National Alliance, For Stability!, Latvia First! party, the Union of Greens and Farmers, and several non-partisan MPs) voted to support withdrawal from the Convention in the first reading and voted to designate the withdrawal legislation as "urgency matter" which means an expedited procedure with only two readings necessary. MP from the Progressives Edmunds Cepurītis denounced the vote by stating: "It will be a disgrace that will haunt not only this, but also future Saeima compositions. It will also haunt each of you who personally supports this initiative." The second reading was scheduled to happen on October 30th.

On October 29th, the day before the Saeima voted on the denunciation, approximately 5,000 people gathered by parliament building to protest against Latvia's withdrawal from the convention. The following day, as the Saeima approved the denunciation with a clear majority, a small rally of about 20 people organized by the extra-parliamentary party Sovereign Power (which holds no seats in parliament) took place in support of the withdrawal. Worth noting that there is no evidence that any political party represented in the Saeima organized or officially endorsed public demonstrations in favour of denunciation. A citizen initiative requesting the Latvian President Edgars Rinkēvičs to return the denunciation law to Saeima for reconsideration gathered more than 68,000 signatures, making it the most-signed petition on the ManaBalss.lv platform to date. Notably, the previous initiative against joining the Istanbul convention with 35,000 signatures was rejected by the Saeima in the past. A new initiative requesting the President to withdraw from the convention is gaining traction with more than 9,000 signatures gathered.

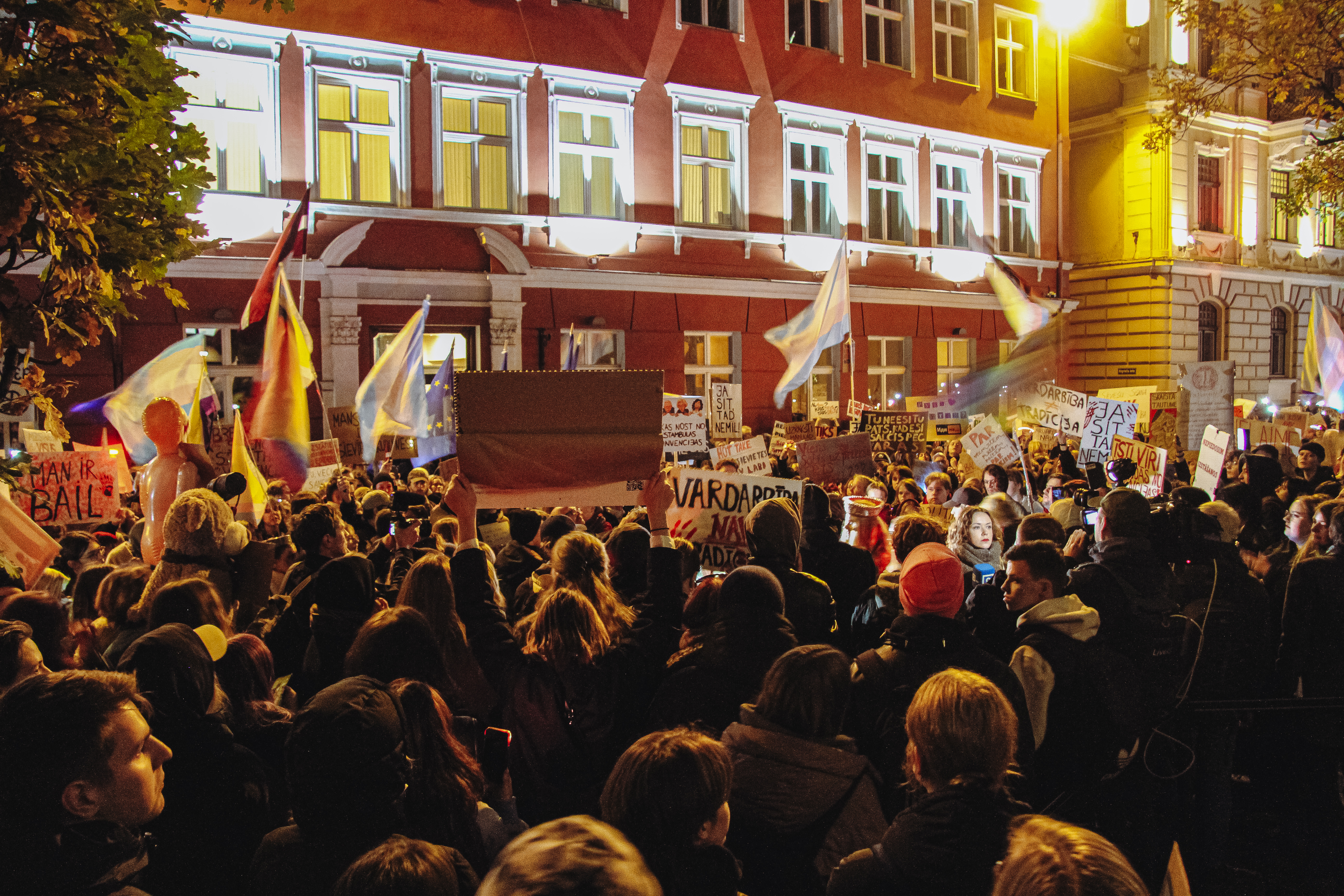
Protest against the denunciation of Istanbul Convention in Riga (October 2025)

On October 30, the Saeima voted 56 in favor and 32 opposed to exit Istanbul Convention. It makes Latvia the first European Union member to vote for withdrawal from the treaty. Rinkēvičs stated that "he would carefully evaluate the law adopted by the Saeima 'On Withdrawal from the Council of Europe Convention on Preventing and Combating Violence against Women and Domestic Violence', not based on ideological or political considerations". The President later vetoed the law, leaving the future of the Istanbul Convention uncertain until at most the next parliamentary election.

As fewer than two-thirds of the members of parliament voted in favor of declaring the draft law urgent, the President may return the law to the Saeima for reconsideration. If this occurs, the Saeima, without debate, refers the President's reasoned objections to the responsible committee and determines the deadline for submitting proposals and for the renewed consideration of the law. The reconsideration follows the same procedure as the third reading of a draft law.

The Constitution provides that the President of the Republic may suspend the promulgation of a law adopted by the Saeima for up to two months. The President may also be requested to do so by not less than one-third of the members of the Saeima — that is, at least 34 deputies. When the President suspends the promulgation of a law, the Central Election Commission must initiate the collection of signatures in order to propose a referendum on the repeal of the law.

=== Countries that have ratified the convention ===
==== Moldova ====
The Parliament of Moldova ratified the convention on 14 October 2021, and it entered into force in Moldova on 1 May 2022.

==== Poland ====
On 13 April 2015, the President of Poland, Bronislaw Komorowski, formally ratified the Convention at the national level, and the ratification documents were deposited with the Council of Europe on 27 April 2015, thus formally binding Poland to the convention, which entered into force in Poland on 1 August 2015.

The convention was opposed by the Law and Justice party of Poland, which ruled the country from November 2015 To October 2023. In July 2020, Polish Justice Minister Zbigniew Ziobro declared that he would prepare a formal procedure to withdraw from the treaty. He said that the treaty is harmful because it requires that schools teach children about gender in an "ideological way" and de-emphasizes biological sex. Earlier in 2012, when in opposition, Ziobro had referred to the treaty as "an invention, a feminist creation aimed at justifying gay ideology". The Law and Justice government also criticized the treaty for stating that "culture, custom, religion, tradition or so-called 'honour' shall not be regarded as justification" for acts of violence against women.

The Polish non-profit fact-checking organization "Stowarzyszenie Demagog" disagreed with the government's statements. In Warsaw, hundreds of people demonstrated against the withdrawal. The announcement was made soon after the European Union relaxed the link between funding and the rule of law, under pressure from Poland and Hungary. The Council of Europe stated, "Leaving the Istanbul Convention would be highly regrettable and a major step backwards in the protection of women against violence in Europe."

Following a change of government in late 2023, the intention to withdraw from the treaty was itself withdrawn. On 30 January 2024, the new Prime Minister Donald Tusk announced his decision to retract the previous PM's motion to the Polish Constitutional Tribunal to examine the convention's compatibility with the Polish Constitution. Tusk stated that the protection of women and children from violence should never be the subject of political bickering, but rather a matter of common concern.

==== Ukraine ====
Ukraine's legislation in the field of (sexual) violence against women and domestic violence had been relatively weak at the start of the 21st century, and the penalties low. In 2011, the Ukrainian government (under president Yanukovych) was one of the authors and first signers of the Istanbul Convention, but tough parliamentary opposition prevented its implementation in subsequent years. In 2016, a majority of parliament still voted against ratification, partly because several churches and conservative politicians had difficulty with the text. Meanwhile, the risk of women to become victims of gender-based violence significantly increased in eastern Ukraine ever since the Russo-Ukrainian War began in 2014.

Throughout the 2010s and the early 2020s, several Ukrainian organisations campaigned for better protection of human rights, pushing for ratification of the convention as a means of achieving that goal. On 6 December 2017, the Ukrainian Parliament and government, under President Petro Poroshenko, adopted several amendments to its Criminal Code, including consent-based definitions of sexual violence, in order to implement the Istanbul Convention. The 2022 Russian invasion of Ukraine, which resulted in a surge of reports of domestic and sexual violence committed against civilians, particularly in the Russian-occupied territories, coupled with the Ukrainian government's desire to join the European Union and gain European support against the invasion, were compelling reasons for eventually ratifying the treaty in its entirety. On 18 June 2022, president Zelenskyy registered in Parliament a bill on the ratification of the Istanbul Convention. On 20 June 2022, the Verkhovna Rada of Ukraine supported the ratification of the Istanbul Convention by 259 votes against 8. Ukraine submitted its instrument of ratification on 18 July 2022, so the Convention entered into force in Ukraine on 1 November 2022.

==== United Kingdom ====
The United Kingdom submitted its instrument of ratification on 21 July 2022, so the Convention entered into force in the UK on 1 November 2022.

== Political debates ==
Criticism includes "the definition and use of the term 'gender' in the convention; the provision obliging states parties to provide teaching on 'non-stereotyped gender roles' at all levels of education; the convention's supposed bias against men; as well as allegations that it threatens state sovereignty."

Anne Brasseur countering criticism against the convention (2019)

In a press release in November 2018, the Council of Europe stated, "Despite its clearly stated aims, several religious and ultra conservative groups have been spreading false narratives about the Istanbul Convention". The release stated that the convention does not seek to impose a certain lifestyle or interfere with personal organization of private life; instead, it seeks only to prevent violence against women and domestic violence. The release states that "the convention is certainly not about ending sexual differences between women and men. Nowhere does the convention ever imply that women and men are or should be 'the same' and that "the convention does not seek to regulate family life and/or family structures: it neither contains a definition of 'family' nor does it promote a particular type of family setting."

According to Balkan Insight, criticism of the convention, which is strongest in Central and Eastern Europe and mainly by the far right and national conservatives, has little foundation in its actual content: "Using disinformation, populist rhetoric, and appeals to Christian and Islamic morality, [critics] have managed to reframe what is essentially a set of guidelines that creates 'a comprehensive legal framework and approach to combat violence against women', into a sinister attempt by Western Europeans to foist their overly-liberal policies on reluctant societies further east".

== See also ==
- Anti-gender movement
- Convention on the Elimination of All Forms of Discrimination Against Women (CEDAW)
- Declaration on the Elimination of Violence Against Women (DEVAW)
- Vienna Declaration and Programme of Action (VDPA)
- Inter-American Convention on the Prevention, Punishment, and Eradication of Violence against Women (Belém do Pará Convention)
- Protocol to the African Charter on Human and Peoples' Rights on the Rights of Women in Africa (Maputo Protocol)
- Expert Group Meeting (EGM): prevention of violence against women and girls
- International human rights law
- International framework of sexual violence
- List of Council of Europe treaties
- Preventing and Combating Violence Against Women and Domestic Violence (Ratification of Convention) Act 2017
