= International Decade of Indigenous Languages =

Initiative by the United Nations

- logo of IDIL
- Duration: 2022-2032
- Location: Globally
- Also known as: IDIL 2022-32
- Theme: Preserving, Revitalizing and Promoting Indigenous Languages
- Website: idil2022-2032.org

International Decade of Indigenous Languages is an initiative launched by the United Nations with a mission to raise awareness on Indigenous language preservation, revitalization and promotion. The initiative is launched as per the suggestion from the Permanent Forum on Indigenous issues, the UN general assembly has declared the decade starting from 2022 to 2032 as the International Decade of Indigenous Languages.

== Background ==
The Decade was proclaimed by the United Nations General Assembly through Resolution A/RES/74/135, following the success of the 2019 International Year of Indigenous Languages. UNESCO leads the implementation of the Decade, in partnership with the United Nations Department of Economic and Social Affairs and other UN agencies. The initiative builds on concerns about the fact that nearly 40 percent of the world’s estimated 6,700 spoken languages are endangered, with the majority being indigenous.

== Objectives ==
The main objectives of IDIL 2022–2032 are to:

- Promote and protect indigenous languages and improve the lives of those who speak and sign them.
- Ensure indigenous peoples’ right to preserve, revitalize, and promote their languages, recognizing linguistic diversity as a pillar of sustainable development.
- Foster international cooperation among governments, organizations, academic institutions, and indigenous communities for language preservation.
- Mainstream indigenous languages and multilingualism into global policy discussions and development agendas

== See also ==
- International Year of Indigenous Languages
- Declaration on the Rights of Indigenous Peoples
- International Day of the World's Indigenous Peoples
- International Mother Language Day
- Language revitalization
- Endangered language
- Lists of endangered languages
