= Belém do Pará Convention =

International human rights instrument

Inter-American Convention on the Prevention, Punishment, and Eradication of Violence against Women
Signed and ratified
Acceded
Not signed
No OAS member
- Signed: 9 June 1994
- Location: Belém do Pará, Brazil
- Effective: 3 February 1995 (Note: Article 21 stipulates: 'This Convention shall enter into force on the thirtieth day after the date of deposit of the second instrument of ratification.' The official list of signatures and ratifications shows that the first state to ratify the Convention was Bolivia on 26 October 1994, followed by Guatemala on 4 January 1995; therefore, thirty days later, on 3 February 1995, the Convention entered into force.)
- Condition: 2 ratifications + 30 days (Note: Article 21.)
- Expiration: Never (Note: Article 24.)
- Signatories: 32
- Parties: 32
- Depositary: General Secretariat of the Organization of American States
- Languages: English, French, Portuguese, Spanish

The Inter-American Convention on the Prevention, Punishment, and Eradication of Violence against Women, better known as the Belém do Pará Convention (or Convention of Belém do Pará), is an international human rights instrument adopted by the Inter-American Commission of Women (CIM) of the Organization of American States (OAS) at a conference held in Belém do Pará, Brazil, on 9 June 1994. It is the first legally binding international treaty that criminalises all forms of violence against women, especially sexual violence. On 26 October 2004, the Follow-Up Mechanism (MESECVI) agency was established to ensure the State parties' compliance with the Convention.

== Background ==
In the late 1980s use of rape as a tool in war by official regimes in El Salvador, Haiti, Peru, and other places across Latin America was exposed, while the traditional taboo on domestic violence was gradually eroded at the same time, forcing violence against women into the forefront of public discourse. As most military dictatorships fell across Latin America during the Third Wave of Democratisation (1978–1995), women began to pressure their civilian governments to address the systemic violence against women from Brazil to Chile to Mexico.

In 1988, the Inter-American Commission of Women followed its model of creating international norms to press for national governmental change. To that end, the commission drafted an Inter-American Convention focusing on violence against women and scheduled a special consultative meeting in 1990. The 1990 Inter-American Consultation on Women and Violence was the first diplomatic meeting of its kind. At the meeting, attendees evaluated the issue of gender-based violence and then organised two inter-governmental meetings of experts to assist with clarification of issues as the proposal for a Convention was drafted. The final instrument, which would become known as the 1994 Belém do Pará Convention, was the first treaty to ever focus explicitly on violence against women. It was presented at a Special Assembly of CIM delegates in April 1994, who approved it and endorsed its submission to the General Assembly of the OAS. It was adopted at Belém do Pará, Brazil, on 9 June 1994, and has been endorsed by 32 of the 34 member States of the OAS.

The delegates of the CIM continued to press for international agreements throughout the Americas that effect change and protect women. In 1998, they adopted the Declaration of Santo Domingo, which recognised that women's inalienable rights exist throughout their lifetime and are an "integral and indivisible part of universal human rights".

== Contents ==
The treaty is written in the four official languages of the Organization of American States; as per Article 25 each [language version] is equally authentic:

- English: Inter-American Convention on the Prevention, Punishment, and Eradication of Violence against Women (Belém do Pará Convention)
- Spanish: Convención Interamericana para Prevenir, Sancionar y Erradicar la Violencia contra la Mujer (Convención de Belém do Pará)
- Portuguese: Convenção Interamericana para Prevenir, Punir e Erradicar a Violência contra a Mulher (Convenção de Belém do Pará)
- French: Convention Interamericaine pour la Prevention, la Sanction et l'Elimination de la Violence contre la Femme (Convention de Belém do Pará)

The text defines what violence against women is, establishes that women have the right to live a life free of violence, and that violence against women constitutes a violation of human rights and fundamental freedoms. It calls for the first time for the establishment of binding mechanisms for protecting and defending women's rights as essential to combating the phenomenon of violence against women's physical, sexual, and psychological integrity, whether in the public or the private sphere, and for asserting those rights within society.

English text of the Belém do Pará Convention (clickable, six pages)

Chapter I: Definition and scope of application

- Article 1: definition of 'violence against women'.
- Article 2: context in which violence against women happens.

Chapter II: Rights protected

- Article 3: recognition of women's right to be publicly and privately free from violence.
- Article 4: recognition that women are entitled to all human rights, providing a number of important specific examples.
- Article 5: recognition that women are entitled to all civil, political, socio-economic and cultural rights; State parties' recognition that violence against women prevents women from exercising these rights.
- Article 6: recognition of women's right to be free from discrimination and to be free of cultural stereotypes and practices that deem them inferior or subordinate, or assign them fixed patterns of behaviour.

Chapter III: Duties of the States

- Article 7: State parties' condemnation of all forms of violence against women and agreement to immediately prevent, punish and eradicate such violence, further detailed in 8 points of focus, including violence against women perpetrated by the State's own agents.
- Article 8: State parties' agreement to undertake progressively specific measures to change societal attitudes and factors that stimulate, allow or excuse violence against women to occur, and to provide proper means of assistance to women who have experienced or are at risk of experiencing violence.
- Article 9: State parties' agreement to take a special interest in protecting women who are especially vulnerable to violence because of their race, ethnicity, being migrants, refugees, displaced, pregnant, disabled, underage, elderly, poor, affected by armed conflict or deprived of their freedom.

Chapter IV: Inter-American mechanisms of protection

- Article 10: State parties' agreement to give an update in their national reports to the CIM on the measures they have taken to fulfill their obligations under Article 7 and 8.
- Article 11: right of State parties and the CIM to request the Inter-American Court of Human Rights' advice on interpretation of this Convention.
- Article 12: right of individuals, groups and NGOs to lodge complaints with the Inter-American Commission on Human Rights on violations of Article 7 by State parties, and the duty of the Commission to consider these claims according to established regulations and procedures.

Chapter V: General provisions

- Article 13: agreement that whenever the domestic law of any State party affords greater protection of women's rights than this Convention, the domestic law is to be preferred.
- Article 14: agreement that whenever the American Convention on Human Rights or other international conventions affords greater protection of women's rights than this Convention, those conventions are to be preferred.
- Article 15: right of all OAS member states to sign this Convention.
- Article 16: duty to ratify this Convention, and to deposit instruments of ratification at the OAS General Secretariat.
- Article 17: right of non-OAS states to accede to this Convention; duty to deposit instruments of accession at the OAS General Secretariat.
- Article 18: right of State parties, when approving, signing, ratifying or acceding to the Convention, to make reservations regarding specific provisions, as long as these are not incompatible with the object and purpose of this Convention.
- Article 19: right of State parties to propose amendments to the Convention to the AOS General Assembly through the CIM. An amendment will enter into force when ratified by two-thirds of all State parties, and will then apply to those State parties, and to any State party which subsequently ratifies the amendment.
- Article 20: regulations regarding this Convention's application in autonomous territories of State parties.
- Article 21: stipulation that this Convention shall enter into force 30 days after the second State's ratification, and 30 days for subsequent States after they have submitted their ratification or accession.
- Article 22: stipulation that the Secretary General shall inform all OAS member states when this Convention shall enter into force.
- Article 23: stipulation that the Secretary General shall annually update OAS member states of this Convention's status.
- Article 24: stipulation that this Convention shall remain in force indefinitely, but that each State party may submit a denunciation, after which this Convention shall cease to apply to that State after one year.
- Article 25: stipulation that the original texts of this Convention are written in English, French, Portuguese and Spanish, that each language version is equally authentic, that these shall be stored in the OAS General Secretariat, and copies of them shall be sent to the United Nations Secretariat.

== State parties ==
As of March 2020, 32 of the 34 or 35 member states of the Organization of American States have either signed and ratified or acceded to the Belém do Pará Convention; only Canada, Cuba and the United States have not. (Note: The OAS membership status of Cuba is currently unclear, see Cuba–OAS relations. This leads some sources to count Cuba as one of the 35 OAS member states, while other sources assert that there are only 34 OAS member states. Either way, and although non-OAS states are allowed to accede to the treaty, Cuba has neither signed nor ratified nor acceded to the Belém do Pará Convention.)

== Follow-Up Mechanism (MESECVI) ==
In order to effectively monitor the State parties' compliance with the Conventions' obligations, the State parties created an agency on 26 October 2004 called the Follow-Up Mechanism to the Belém do Pará Convention, abbreviated MESECVI. (Note: MESECVI is an abbreviation of the full Spanish name Mecanismo de Seguimiento de la Implementación de la Convención Interamericana para Prevenir, Sancionar y Erradicar la Violencia contra la Mujer, frequently shortened to Mecanismo de Seguimiento de la Convención de Belém do Pará.) MESECVI consists of two bodies: the Conference of State Parties and the Committee of Experts.

- The Conference of State Parties is a political body, which studies the country reports submitted by each State party, and supervises the Committee of Experts.
- The Committee of Experts is a technical body, which presents recommendations and guidelines to the Conference of State Parties. It consists of specialists serving in a personal capacity who are appointed by the State parties.

MESECVI is headquartered at the Executive Secretariat of the CIM in Washington, D.C.

== Impact ==
Politicians and citizens on the importance of the Belém do Pará and Istanbul Conventions (2015)

According to Professor Rashida Manjoo and Professor Jackie Jones (2018), the Belém do Pará Convention has significantly contributed to making the 'Inter-American human rights system, while far from perfect, arguably the world's most well-developed and effective human rights system in the violence against women context.' The Convention had been cited in over 20 cases before the Inter-American Commission and Court, and 'helped to further define and give specificity to the norms of the American Convention on Human Rights and other Inter-American human rights instruments in the VAW context.'

For example, the Belém do Pará Convention was used alongside the American Convention on Human Rights when the Inter-American Court of Human Rights intervened in the Cotton Field femicides case, on requests from victims' relatives, who, motivated by the Mexican authorities' lack of response, filed a complaint against the Mexican state. In its 2009 judgement, the Court found Mexico to be responsible for multiple rights violations, including the State obligations under the Belém do Pará Convention 'to use due diligence to respond to violence against women' according to Article 7, paragraphs b and c. The verdict caused Mexico to undertake some positive steps to comply with the Court's order. However, the case revealed that the justiciability of the Convention was mostly limited to Article 7, which stipulates the immediate obligations of state parties; Article 8 and 9 are mostly useful for interpreting these obligations, and the obligations of state parties to other conventions such as the American Convention on Human Rights.

Moreover, Manjoo and Jones criticised the fact that the United States and Canada had still not ratified the two Conventions, '[leaving] millions of women and girls without the protections afforded by these treaties.' In conclusion, they argue that an improved version of the Belém do Pará Convention, with a better emphasis on state parties' immediate obligations, would be the best model for a worldwide treaty on violence against women, replacing the United Nations' non-binding 1993 Declaration on the Elimination of Violence Against Women (DEVAW), as long as there is a sustained campaign – preferably led by VAW survivors and their advocates – towards universal ratification by all states in the world.

== See also ==
- International framework of sexual violence
- Declaration on the Elimination of Discrimination Against Women (DEDAW) – United Nations (1967)
- Convention on the Elimination of All Forms of Discrimination against Women (CEDAW) – United Nations (1979)
- Vienna Declaration and Programme of Action (VDPA) – United Nations (June 1993)
- Declaration on the Elimination of Violence Against Women (DEVAW) – United Nations (December 1993)
- Protocol to the African Charter on Human and Peoples' Rights on the Rights of Women in Africa (Maputo Protocol) – African Union (2003)
- Convention on preventing and combating violence against women and domestic violence (Istanbul Convention) – Council of Europe (2011)
