= Maekiaphan Phillips =

U.S. Virgin Islander Indigenous rights activist and nonprofit executive

Maekiphan Phillips
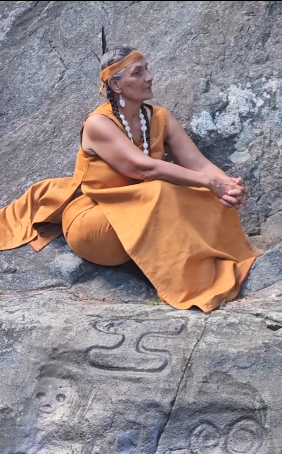
- Maekiaphan Phillips visiting sacred petroglyphs
- Born: Saint Thomas, U.S. Virgin Islands
- Occupations: Kasike, nonprofit executive
- Known for: Indigenous rights activism
- Children: 12

Maekiaphan Phillips is a U.S. Virgin Islander Indigenous rights activist and nonprofit executive serving as the kasike of the Guainía Taíno Tribe of the Virgin Islands, a tribe for Taíno descendants. She is the founder and president of the nonprofit Opi'a Taino International, Inc. In 2022, due largely to her efforts, the US Virgin Islands Governor Albert Bryan Jr. issued a proclamation of Indigenous Peoples' Day, and he has since referenced her tribe's contributions to preserving Indigenous history and education in observances of the holiday.

== Early life ==
Phillips is great-granddaughter of Francisca Almestica Delgado and the granddaughter of Bellencita Almestica. According to Phillips, her great-grandmother, at the age of 14, was kidnapped from Vieques, Puerto Rico by the pirate James Abbott. Almestica Delgado was brought to Salt Island, British Virgin Islands where she later had children with an African man.

== Career ==
Phillips, her husband Tesroy Phillips, and their 12 children have worked towards federal tribal recognition. Phillips established and serves as the president of the nonprofit Opi'a Taino International, Inc. an organization that aims to restore the cultural heritage, raise awareness of, and educate about the Taíno, Arawak, and Kalinago peoples.

In 2012, Phillips became kasike of the Guainía Taíno Tribe of the Virgin Islands. That year, she lectured on the Taíno culture at the Virgin Islands Humanities Council's center. In March 2016, Phillips testified in support of Indigenous cultural protections to the culture, historic preservation, youth, and recreation committee of the legislature of the Virgin Islands. She also shared details on her own background. In 2017, Phillips hosted a pow wow in Saint Thomas on the International Day of the World's Indigenous Peoples.

After Hurricane Irma, Phillips and Opi'a Taino, Inc. served free meals. She worked for the nonprofit All Hands and Hearts – Smart Response and led efforts to rebuild after Hurricane Maria. Phillips converted her home kitchen into a commercial kitchen to feed 50 to 80 people daily.

In June 2021, after an almost 10-year campaign led by Phillips, governor Albert Bryan signed a proclamation recognizing the Guainía Taíno Tribe of the Virgin Islands. The proclamation states that the tribe can "...establish eligibility for federal health benefits, federal education benefits, housing benefits, job training, land use, and the right to engage in traditional religious practices and ceremonies." In April 2022, she led outreach to those with Taíno ancestry. In addition to holding open enrollment, she prioritized applications from descendants who may share ancestry with her. Phillips has advocated for the creation of a tourist destination, a preserved area on Saint Thomas to be used as a batey.

== See also ==
- Native American women in politics
