= Guainía Taíno Tribe =

Indigenous Taíno community based in Puerto Rico and the United States Virgin Islands

Iukaieke Guainía

Regions with significant populations
- Puerto Rico, US Virgin Islands

Languages
- English, Spanish

Related ethnic groups
- Taíno, Kalinago

The Guainía Taíno Tribe (Taíno: iukaieke Guainía) is an Indigenous Caribbean community based in Puerto Rico and the United States Virgin Islands, composed of the Guainía Taíno Tribe of Borikén and the Guainía Taíno Tribe of the US Virgin Islands. In the US Virgin Islands, they were formally acknowledged as an Indigenous American tribe by Governor Albert Bryan Jr., and their contributions to preserving the territory's Indigenous history, educational research, and heritage restoration have also been recognized.

== Etymology ==
The name Guainía comes from the name of the largest Taíno territory on Borikén (Puerto Rico). It covered the southern coastal area of Puerto Rico and into the interior of the island prior to the arrival of Columbus. The word iukaieke means village.

== Culture ==
The leader (kasike) of the Guainía territory was an important Indigenous leader on the island and a skillful orator in the pre-Columbian era. As of 2022, the kasike of the Guainía in the US Virgin Islands is Maekiaphan Phillips, while the kasike of the Guainía in Puerto Rico is Roberto "Múkaro Agueibaná" Borrero. The two kasike maintain a dual citizenship pact, with Nitaíno Councils assisting both leaders in their respective affairs. Iukaieke Guainía has also established a separate non-profit in Puerto Rico to assist them in furthering "community development".

According to the Guainía Taíno Tribe, Guainía was the historic Arawakan language of the Guainía Taíno which extended across the Caribbean islands and into South America.

== Recognition ==
Taíno communities in US territories have previously struggled to obtain federal recognition as a tribe, in part because of their territorial status. Guainía activists have also cited notions of blood quantum and paper genocide as reasons, concepts that have promoted an extinction narrative due to the legacy of colonialism in the Caribbean. The Guainía Taíno Tribe nevertheless assert the right to self-determination as descendants of the broader Taíno people. They and other Taíno groups in non-sovereign U.S. territories are represented on the International Indian Treaty Council under the United Confederation of Taíno People. The IITC and UCTP has campaigned nationally and at the United Nations for the United States to recognize such groups.

After a 10 year campaign, the tribe was finally recognized by Governor Albert Bryan of the US Virgin Islands as an "indigenous American Indian Tribe of the Virgin Islands" on 28 June 2021, which granted them the ability to “establish eligibility for federal health benefits, federal education benefits, housing benefits, job training, land use, and the right to engage in traditional religious practices and ceremonies“. He later honored their kasike's campaign for recognition during an observance of Indigenous People's Day in the territory.

In 2022, the tribe was contacted for consultation by the National Park Service of the US Department of the Interior on a project involving the exchange of land. The tribe also cooperated with the Virgin Islands Children's Museum to create a replica Taíno bohío (house) in the museum to "bolster cultural survival and educate visitors about ancestral Taíno life."

In 2024 on August 9, the tribe's continuing contributions to the preservation of Indigenous history and culture in the Virgin Islands was once again acknowledged by the Governor in observance of the International Day of the World’s Indigenous People.

== Affiliation ==
Tribal affiliation is open to Taíno Tribal Nation members and persons of Arawak and Island Carib (Kalinago) ancestry.

The tribe is a member of the United Confederation of Taíno People.

== Membership ==
Phillips has stated that the first requirement of enrollment involves genealogical research. However, she also noted that an individual's "percentage of Taino DNA" is not important, as "some people only have oral stories." She has expressed interest in those who share descent with her through her maternal great-grandmother Francisca, and estimated as many as 81 families are related.

== See also ==
- Indigenous peoples of the Caribbean
- Indigenous peoples of the Americas
