= Indigenous language =

Language that is native to a region and spoken by Indigenous peoples

An Indigenous language, or autochthonous language, is a language that is native to a region and spoken by its Indigenous peoples. Indigenous languages are not necessarily national languages but they can be; for example, Aymara is both an Indigenous language and an official language of Bolivia. Also, national languages are not necessarily Indigenous to the country.

Many Indigenous peoples worldwide have stopped the generational passage of their ancestral languages and have instead adopted the majority language as part of their acculturation into their host culture. Furthermore, many Indigenous languages have been subject to linguicide (language killing). Recognizing their vulnerability, the United Nations proclaimed 2019 the International Year of Indigenous Languages "to draw attention to the critical loss of Indigenous languages and the urgent need to preserve, revitalize and promote Indigenous languages."

== Language loss ==
Indigenous languages are disappearing for various reasons, including the mass extinction of entire speaker communities by natural disaster or genocide, aging communities in which the language is not passed on, and oppressive language planning policies that actively seek to eradicate languages. In North America since 1600, at least 52 Native American languages have disappeared. Additionally, there are over 500 different Indigenous groups in the Americas, yet at least 20 percent of them are estimated to have lost their mother tongue. There may be more than 7,000 languages that exist in the world today, though many of them have not been recorded because they belong to tribes in rural areas of the world or are not easily accessible. Some languages are very close to disappearing:

Forty six languages are known to have just one native speaker while 357 languages have fewer than 50 speakers. Rare languages are more likely to show evidence of decline than more common ones.

It was found that among the languages used in 1950, over 75% of them are now extinct or moribund in the United States, Canada, and Australia. Meanwhile, less than 10% of languages in sub-Saharan Africa have gone extinct or are moribund. Overall findings show that "19% of the world's living languages are no longer being learned by children," which is a leading cause of lingual extinction. Although small languages face risks of extinction, languages at severe risk of extinction have particularly been said to have an estimated threshold of about 330 speakers or less. Small languages have been quantified to have less than 35,000 speakers, and nearly all languages with 35,000 or more speakers have been found to be all growing at around the same rates.

Oklahoma provides the backdrop for an example of language loss in the developed world. It boasts the highest density of Indigenous languages in the United States. That includes languages originally spoken in the region, as well as those of Native American tribes from other areas that were forcibly relocated onto reservations there. The US government drove the Yuchi from Tennessee to Oklahoma in the early 19th century. Until the early 20th century, most Yuchi tribe members spoke the language fluently. Then, government boarding schools severely punished American Indian students who were overheard speaking their own language. To avoid beatings and other punishments, Yuchi and other Indian children abandoned their native languages in favor of English.

In 2005, only five elderly members of the Yuchi tribe were fluent in the language. These remaining speakers spoke Yuchi fluently before they went to school and have maintained the language despite strong pressure to abandon it.

The situation was not limited to Oklahoma. In the Northwest Pacific plateau, there are no speakers left of the Indigenous tribal languages from that area all the way to British Columbia.

Oregon's Siletz reservation, established in 1855, was home to the endangered language Siletz Dee-ni. The reservation held members of 27 different Indian bands speaking many languages. In order to communicate, people adopted Chinook Jargon, a pidgin or hybrid language. Between the use of Chinook Jargon and the increased presence of English, the number of speakers of Indigenous languages dwindled.

The extinction of Indigenous language can be seen outside of North America, as well. Of Australia's at least 250 aboriginal languages, most have now gone extinct with very low likelihood of the remaining languages surviving. Reasons for these declines can be attributed to the spread of diseases, such as the measles and smallpox epidemics, forced displacement of inhabitants by settlers, and social, political, and economic isolation and exclusion. Some researchers blame the extinction of language in Australia on a decline in "biolinguistic diversity", a term which identifies a parallel between an area's biodiversity and an area's linguistic diversity. This phenomenon compares the extinction of wildlife upon the introduction of a dangerous predator or extreme change in habitat to the death of Indigenous language upon cultural, social, and environmental changes and forced assimilation.

Other tribes of Native Americans were also forced into government schools and reservations. They were also treated badly if they did not become "civilized", which meant they were to go to Christian churches and speak English. They were forced to give up their tribal religious beliefs and languages. Now, Native Americans are trying to regain some of their lost heritage. They gather at "pow-wow" to share culture, stories, remedies, dances, music, rhythms, recipes and heritage with anyone who wants to learn them.

In January 2008, in Anchorage, Alaska, friends and relatives gathered to bid their last farewell to 89 year old Marie Smith Jones, a beloved matriarch of her community. "As they bid her farewell, they also bid farewell to the Eyak language as Marie was the last fluent speaker of the language."

Overall, there are many different reasons that can lead to the death of languages. The death of all speakers of an Indigenous language can cause languages to become entirely extinct. Much of these deaths occurred during times of colonization, resulting in genocide, war, famine, and the spread of disease. Additionally, the concept of "biolinguistic diversity" is a prevalent phenomenon in academic discussions surrounding linguistic extinction. This concept argues that there are clear similarities between the wildlife extinction due to dangerous environmental alterations and the linguistic extinction due to colonialism, and the forced erasure and replacement of Indigenous language and culture. Finally, restrictive language policies contribute to the death of Indigenous languages, and is a common practice in various regions across the world. Bilingual education and the use of non-dominant languages in educational settings have historically been outlawed in many areas globally, such as Australia, the United States, Serbia, and East Africa. Although some repressive policies have been reversed in more recent years, the impacts of the established restrictive language policies had already taken their toll.

== Education and preservation ==
The preservation of Indigenous Peoples and culture is contingent on the preservation of Indigenous language. According to the United Nations Permanent Forum on Indigenous Issues, it is estimated that every two weeks, one Indigenous language disappears. A language is considered healthy when it gains new speakers, and becomes endangered when children stop learning or speaking it. Therefore, implementing Indigenous languages into early education can help prevent Indigenous languages from disappearing.

Hundreds of Indigenous languages around the world are taught by traditional means, including vocabulary, grammar, readings, and recordings.

About 6,000 others can be learned to some extent by listening to recordings made for other purposes, such as religious texts for which translations are available in more widely-known languages.

There have been many efforts made by the United Nations to guarantee the protection of Indigenous languages. Articles 13, 14, and 16 of the United Nations Declaration on the Rights of Indigenous Peoples recognize Indigenous communities' rights to self determination and revitalization of Indigenous language and education.

Article 13

1. Indigenous peoples have the right to revitalize, use, develop and transmit to future generations their histories, languages, oral traditions, philosophies, writing systems and literatures, and to designate and retain their own names for communities, places and persons. 2. States shall take effective measures to ensure that this right is protected and also to ensure that Indigenous peoples can understand and be understood in political, legal and administrative proceedings, where necessary through

he provision of interpretation or by other appropriate means.

— United Nations General Assembly, United Nations Declaration on the Rights of Indigenous Peoples, General Assembly on 13 September 2007

Article 14

1. Indigenous peoples have the right to establish and control their educational systems and institutions providing education in their own languages, in a manner appropriate to their cultural methods of teaching and learning. 2. Indigenous individuals, particularly children, have the right to all levels and forms of education of the State without discrimination.

3. States shall, in conjunction with Indigenous peoples, take effective measures, in order for Indigenous individuals, particularly children, including those living outside their communities, to have access, when possible, to an education in their own culture and provided in their own language.

— United Nations General Assembly, United Nations Declaration on the Rights of Indigenous Peoples, General Assembly on 13 September 2007

Article 16

1. Indigenous peoples have the right to establish their own media in their own languages and to have access to all forms of non-Indigenous media without discrimination.

2. States shall take effective measures to ensure that State-owned media duly reflect Indigenous cultural diversity. States, without prejudice to ensuring full freedom of expression, should encourage privately owned media to adequately reflect Indigenous cultural diversity.

— United Nations General Assembly, United Nations Declaration on the Rights of Indigenous Peoples, General Assembly on 13 September 2007

The Indigenous and Tribal Peoples Convention (No. 169) of the International Labour Organization also recognizes and upholds the linguistic rights of Indigenous communities.

Local Indigenous communities have also made efforts to create Indigenous-focused pedagogical programs and combat English monolingualism in schools. For example, in the 1970s, Native Hawaiian language neared extinction. However, the community was able to revitalize the language by advocating for the teaching of public school curriculums solely in Hawaiian. This effort eventually resulted in the Hawaiian language being reinstated as the official language of the State of Hawaii in 1978.

Similar efforts were made in Kamchatka, Russia, where Indigenous peoples of the region fought for the preservation of the Itelmen language. Itelmen speakers and the Kamchatkan government have launched several native language development programs, such as the introduction of Indigenous language in schools. Additionally, the Kamchatkan government has also aimed to make the Itelmen language more accessible by mass media broadcasting native language content and sharing songs in Itelmen via online platforms and apps within the Itelmen community.

The Hualapai Bilingual/Bicultural Education Program based in Peach Springs, Arizona has been recognized as one of the best language revitalization programs in the United States. The organization was created in 1975 when linguist, Akira Yamamoto, began learning the Hualapai language and culture. Yamamoto was driven by a desire to develop resources that would help preserve the language for children.

After receiving a three-year grant from Title VII's Bilingual Education Act, Yamamoto managed to establish an orthography, a dictionary, and teaching materials in the Hualapai language. The program coordinators sought input from Hualapai parents and elders to evaluate the developed curriculum and educational objectives, among other things. The organization's efforts have advanced the development and growth of programs focused on Native American languages and their speakers, both at the local and national levels. Most notably, these efforts resulted in the establishment of the American Indian Languages Development Institute and the creation and passage of the Native American Languages Act.

== "Treasure language" ==
The term "treasure language" was proposed by the Rama people of Nicaragua as an alternative to heritage language, Indigenous language, and "ethnic language" since those names are considered pejorative in the local context. The term is now also used in the context of public storytelling events.

The term "treasure language" references the desire of speakers to sustain the use of their mother tongue into the future:

[The] notion of treasure fit the idea of something that had been buried and almost lost, but was being rediscovered and now shown and shared. And the word treasure also evoked the notion of something belonging exclusively to the Rama people, who now attributed it real value and had become eager and proud of being able to show it to others.

Accordingly, the term may be considered to be distinct from endangered language for which objective criteria are available, or heritage language, which describes an end-state for a language for which individuals are more fluent in a dominant language.

== See also ==
Challenges and needs for developing content in Indigenous Languages, PDF in Wikimedia projects

- Australian Aboriginal languages
- Formosan languages
- Irish language
- Language education
- Linguistic imperialism
- Minority language
- Language revitalization
- International Day of the World's Indigenous Peoples
- Stratum (linguistics)

== Bibliography ==
- Frawley, William, & Hill, Kenneth C. (2002) Making Dictionaries: preserving Indigenous languages of the Americas. Berkeley: University of California Press.
- Harrison, K. David (2007). When Languages die. doi:10.1093/acprof:oso/9780195181920.001.0001. ISBN 978-0-19-518192-0.
- Singerman, Robert (1996). Indigenous Languages of the Americas: A Bibliography of Dissertations and Theses. Scarecrow Press. ISBN 978-0-8108-3032-5. OCLC 605569711.
- Wurm, S. A. & Heyward, Ian (eds.) (2001) Atlas of the World's Languages in Danger of Disappearing. Paris: UNESCO Pub.
