= Indigenous Peoples Climate Change Assessment Initiative =

Indigenous Peoples' Biocultural Climate Change Assessment Initiative
- Abbreviation: IPCCA
- Legal status: Partnership
- Purpose: To: 1. empower indigenous peoples to develop and use indigenous frameworks to assess the impact of climate change on their communities and ecosystems 2. to develop and implement strategies for building indigenous resilience and adaptive strategies to mitigate impacts 3. to enhance biocultural diversity for food sovereignty and self determined development or “Buen Vivir.”
- Headquarters: Association for Nature and Sustainable Development (ANDES); Calle Ruinas 451, Cusco
- Location: Peru
- Region served: Global
- Members: i. Association Andes, ii. Indigenous Peoples Consortium on climate Change, iii. Call of the Earth Group, iv. Traditional Knowledge Initiative of the Institute of Advanced Studies (United Nations University) v. International Institute for Environment and development vi. OXFAM-NOVIB vii. Christensfund vii. Land is Life
- Official language: Spanish, English
- Website: Indigenous Peoples Climate Change Assessment Initiative

The Indigenous Peoples' Biocultural Climate Change Assessment Initiative (IPCCA) is an international indigenous research initiative arising out of the United Nations Permanent Forum on Indigenous Issues, where it was noted:

" .. cultures that support TK [Traditional Knowledge] around the world are often living in marginal ecosystems, such as the Arctic, mountains, deserts and small islands ..[which are] .. often the sources of key ecosystem services .... most vulnerable to climate change"

At the Seventh Session of the Permanent Forum, held from 21 April to 2 May 2008, it was recommended that:

" ..the United Nations University – Institute of Advanced Studies, university research centres and relevant United Nations agencies conduct further studies on the impacts of climate change and climate change responses on indigenous peoples who are living in highly fragile ecosystems".

From this recommendation, a formal Indigenous Peoples Climate Change Assessment Initiative was formed between the United Nations University's Institute of Advanced Studies and a number of non-United Nations partners; with an indigenous led steering committee coordinated by a secretariat housed within the Association for Nature and Sustainable Development (ANDES), Peru; and an objective:

"To empower indigenous peoples to develop and use indigenous frameworks to assess the impact of climate change on their communities and ecosystems and to develop and implement strategies for building indigenous resilience and adaptive strategies to mitigate impacts while enhancing biocultural diversity for food sovereignty and self determined development or “Buen Vivir.”"

== Global Summit ==
On the 20–24 April 2009, members of the Indigenous Peoples' Biocultural Climate Change Assessment Initiative assisted a Global Summit of Indigenous Peoples held in Anchorage (Alaska) to discuss Climate Change

"The purpose of the Summit was to enable indigenous peoples from all regions of the globe to exchange their knowledge and experience in adapting to the impacts of climate change, and to develop key messages and recommendations to be articulated to the world at the Conference of Parties (COP) to the UN Framework Convention on Climate Change in Copenhagen, Denmark in December 2009"

The United Nations University - Institute of Advanced Studies provided significant and substantive assistance preparing background papers for this Summit, with the logistics of this Summit, plus with rapporteuring for this Summit, one of the outcomes of which was an 'Anchorage Declaration' of Indigenous Peoples on Climate Change

== Indigenous participation in climate change research – an academic perspective ==
The authors of "Indigenous framework for observing and responding to climate change in Alaska", an article appearing in the March 2013 issue of Climatic Change, argue that there needs to be a five-pronged approach to increasing the participation of indigenous peoples in creating climate-change remedies.

1. Employ communities in the formulation of solutions to climate change.
2. Foster an environment where multiple ways of understanding, both western and indigenous, can be accepted and celebrated.
3. Provide direct assistance on the community-level for those seeking out concrete ways to protect themselves from climate-change related issues.
4. Encourage teamwork for devising solutions for climate change that satisfy both western and indigenous points of view.
5. Strengthen communication networks of tribes, scientists, and other anti-climate-change actors so that collaboration can provide more specific fixes to climate change.

== See also ==
- United Nations Permanent Forum on Indigenous Issues
- United Nations University
- Global warming
- Effects of global warming
- Indigenous peoples
- Traditional Ecological Knowledge
