= Željka Markić =

Croatian activist

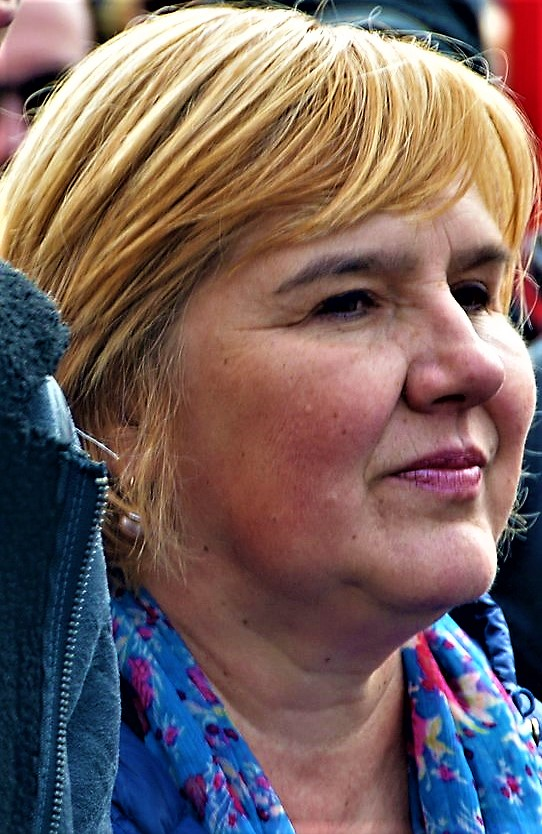
- Markić protesting the Istanbul Convention, March 24, 2018, Zagreb
- Born: Željka Živković; 11 November 1964 (age 61); Zagreb, SR Croatia, SFR Yugoslavia
- Education: School of Medicine, University of Zagreb
- Organization(s): U ime obitelji, Mary's Meals
- Spouse: Tihomir Markić
- Children: 4

Željka Markić (née Živković; born 11 November 1964) is a leader of Croatian right-wing movement U ime obitelji (In the Name of Family).

She was born in Zagreb, then Yugoslavia, as the oldest of six children. She attended Classical Gymnasium in Zagreb and graduated from School of Medicine at University of Zagreb.

She worked as a war reporter during the Croatian War of Independence and later for BBC, NBC and RAI II. She was editor of the Nova TV news programme from 2004 to 2007. She also edited television shows on Croatian Radiotelevision (HRT). Markić was a contributor to Human Rights Watch from 1992 to 1994.

She is the author of the few documentary films on BBC and Channel 4, such as Guy Smith, Correspondent and Unforgiving and co-director of documentary film Children of War together with Alan Raynolds.

She translated works of John Grisham, Antonio A. Borelli and Roy Gutman.

She was the first president of the right-wing party Croatian Growth and founder of Croatian subsidiary of Mary's Meals organisation.

She is one of the key organisers of the 2013 Croatian constitutional referendum for which civic initiative U ime obitelji (In the Name of Family) had collected 749,613 signatures.

She is married to physician Tihomir Markić with whom she has four sons.

Markić's opposition to sexual minority privileges has repeatedly drawn criticism in the media. However her push for the referendum and its subsequent passing supports her viewpoint. She has opposed Croatia's ratification of the Istanbul Convention on preventing violence against women and domestic violence. She is also opposed to abortion and euthanasia.

A 2024 study by the Croatian Journalists' Association and Miko Tripalo Centre for Democracy and Law identified Markić as one of the major SLAPP plaintiffs in the country, citing six lawsuits she filed against journalists.
