= Declaration on the Elimination of Violence Against Women =

Declaration adopted in 1993 by the United Nations General Assembly

The Declaration on the Elimination of Violence Against Women
- Created: 1993
- Ratified: 20 December 1993
- Purpose: Women's rights

The Declaration on the Elimination of Violence Against Women (abbreviated as DEVAW) was adopted without a vote by the United Nations General Assembly in the 48/104 resolution of 20 December 1993. Contained within it is the recognition of "the urgent need for the universal application to women of the rights and principles with regard to equality, security, liberty, integrity and dignity of all human beings". It recalls and embodies the same rights and principles as those enshrined in such instruments as the Universal Declaration of Human Rights, (Note: "Noting that those rights and principles are enshrined in international instruments, including the Universal Declaration of Human Rights, the International Covenant on Civil and Political Rights, the International Covenant on Economic, Social and Cultural Rights, the Convention on the Elimination of All Forms of Discrimination against Women and the Convention against Torture and Other Cruel, Inhuman or Degrading Treatment or Punishment" (paragraph 2 of the preamble to the Declaration on the Elimination of Violence against Women).) and Articles 1 and 2 provide the most widely used definition of violence against women.

== Background ==
The international recognition that women have a right to a life free from violence is a recent one, emerging around 1970. Historically, their struggles with violence, and with the impunity that often protects the perpetrators, is linked with their fight to overcome discrimination. Since its founding the United Nations has concerned itself with the advancement of women's rights through institutions such as the United Nations Commission on the Status of Women (CSW), but did not specifically target the high rates of females who were targeted with violence until the early 1990s. The 1979 Convention on the Elimination of All Forms of Discrimination against Women (CEDAW) never mentioned violence against women; the June 1993 Vienna Declaration and Programme of Action (VDPA) was the first international document to explicitly condemn violence against women. (Note: Note that in 1992, the CEDAW Committee did publish General Recommendation 19, but this was a non-binding statement, and rather than defining 'violence against women' as such, it recommended extending the definition of discrimination against women to include 'gender-based violence': 'The definition of discrimination includes gender-based violence, that is, violence that is directed against a woman because she is a woman or that affects women disproportionately.' This differs significantly from Article 1 of the DEVAW, which defined 'violence against women' with reference to 'gender-based violence', but without defining the latter in terms of women as intended or disproportionate targets, and without reference to 'discrimination of women': 'the term "violence against women" means any act of gender-based violence that results in, or is likely to result in, physical, sexual or psychological harm or suffering to women'. Nevertheless, paragraph 6 of the DEVAW preamble does claim that 'violence against women' and 'discrimination against women' are linked: 'Recognizing that violence against women is a manifestation of historically unequal power relations between men and women, which have led to domination over and discrimination against women by men and to the prevention of the full advancement of women, and that violence against women is one of the crucial social mechanisms by which women are forced into a subordinate position compared with men'.) The DEVAW resolution was developed as an extension of CEDAW, and explicitly states that the strengthening and complementing of CEDAW is one of its goals. (Note: "Recognizing that effective implementation of the Convention on the Elimination of All Forms of Discrimination against Women would contribute to the elimination of violence against women and that the Declaration on the Elimination of Violence against Women, set forth in the present resolution, will strengthen and complement that process" (paragraph 3 of the preamble to the Declaration on the Elimination of Violence against Women).)

In September 1992, the CSW appointed a special working group to prepare a draft declaration against violence against women. One of the aims of the resolution was to overturn the prevailing governmental stance that violence against women was a private, domestic matter not requiring state intervention. At the time, it was known that wife beating (often grouped under the terms "domestic violence" or "intimate partner violence") was the most common form of violence against women. For example, Levinson (1989) found that, in 86% of ninety studied cultures, there was structural violence by husbands against their wives; other studies at the time demonstrated a similar cross-cultural pattern. The health consequences of such violence were considerable; for example, in the United States, it was the leading cause of injuries in women, 22–35% of women who visited emergency rooms did so because of symptoms resulting from partner abuse, and wife beating led 4–5 times more often to the need for psychiatric treatment and 5 times more often to suicide attempts than in other women. Furthermore, sexual violence including rape were increasingly recognised as a problem that affected a significant percentage of all women. To mark International Women's Day on 8 March 1993, General Secretary, Boutros Boutros-Ghali, issued a statement in preparation of the declaration explicitly outlining the UN's role in the 'promotion' and 'protection' of women's rights:

The struggle for women's rights, and the task of creating a new United Nations, able to promote peace and the values which nurture and sustain it, are one and the same. Today - more than ever - the cause of women is the cause of all humanity.

== Definition of Violence Against Women ==
According to a January 2012 concept note of the International Expert Group Meeting on Combating violence against indigenous women and girls (working for UNPFII), Articles 1 and 2 of the DEVAW provide "the most widely used definition of violence against women and girls"; this claim is echoed by Jacqui True (2012).

Article One:

For the purposes of this Declaration, the term "violence against women" means any act of gender-based violence that results in, or is likely to result in, physical, sexual or psychological harm or suffering to women, including threats of such acts, coercion or arbitrary deprivation of liberty, whether occurring in public or in private life.

Article Two:

Violence against women shall be understood to encompass, but not be limited to, the following:

(a) Physical, sexual and psychological violence occurring in the family, including battering, sexual abuse of female children in the household, dowry-related violence, marital rape, female genital mutilation and other traditional practices harmful to women, non-spousal violence and violence related to exploitation;
(b) Physical, sexual and psychological violence occurring within the general community, including rape, sexual abuse, sexual harassment and intimidation at work, in educational institutions and elsewhere, trafficking in women and forced prostitution;
(c) Physical, sexual and psychological violence perpetrated or condoned by the State, wherever it occurs.

== Influence ==
The Declaration on the Elimination of Violence Against Women (DEVAW) has had an impact on the development of several other human rights instruments and institutions:

- United Nations Special Rapporteur on Violence Against Women: DEVAW was one of the documents invoked by the UN Commission on Human Rights in Resolution 1994/45 adopted on 4 March 1994, in which it decided to appoint Radhika Coomaraswamy as its first United Nations Special Rapporteur on Violence Against Women, including its causes and consequences. The Special Rapporteur has a mandate to collect and analyse data from governments, treaty bodies, specialized agencies, NGOs, and other interested parties, and to respond effectively to such information. Furthermore, they also have a role in making recommendations on an international, national and regional level, as well as liaising with other Special Rapporteurs, special representatives, working groups and independent experts of the Commission on Human Rights.
- Inter-American Convention on the Prevention, Punishment, and Eradication of Violence against Women (Belém do Pará Convention): DEVAW is mentioned in the preamble of the Belém do Pará Convention of 9 June 1994.
- International Day for the Elimination of Violence against Women: UN Resolution 54/134 of 17 December 1999, which recognised 25 November as the International Day for the Elimination of Violence against Women, invoked the Declaration on the Elimination of Violence Against Women (UN Resolution 48/104) twice.

== Problems ==
Many women's rights advocates who believe in human rights have expressed concerns that much of the ground gained by the declaration has been threatened by the rise of more conservative forces within the international community. In March 2003, during a meeting of the UN Commission on the Status of Women, the delegate from Iran objected to the inclusion of a paragraph that called on governments to "condemn violence against women and refrain from invoking any custom, tradition, or religious consideration to avoid their obligations with respect to its elimination as set out in the Declaration of the Elimination of Violence against Women." Representatives from Egypt, Pakistan, Sudan and US also raised objections; making it the first ever diplomatic failure at the UN Commission on the Status of Women.

== Campaigns ==
Each year, the International Day for the Elimination of Violence against Women marks the start of 16 Days of Activism against Gender-based Violence. Human Rights organisations such as Center for Women's Global Leadership, Unifem, Women Won't Wait, Women for a Change, Women's Aid, and other groups join together to speak out against gender violence and to promote the rights and principles of the declaration. A striking step that was taken to end the violence that women face was launched in 2008 and is known as the "Unite to End Violence against Women". This aims to raise public awareness to the problem and in ending the violence women and girls face all around the world. With there still being so much room for change today only 2 out of 3 countries have banned domestic violence and 37 countries that exempt sex perpetuators from being prosecuted if they are either married to the victim or will soon be married to the victim. There are also 49 countries who till this day have no laws that will protect women from domestic violence.

On 10 April 2009, Amnesty International held a demonstration in Narayanghat, Nepal, to highlight the plight of women's rights activists after the Nepalese state failed to protect two activists from violent attacks and, finally, their murder. Despite ratifying the declaration, Nepal had failed to abide by Article 4-c which asserts the clear obligation of states to:

Exercise due diligence to prevent, investigate and, in accordance with national legislation, punish acts of violence against women, whether those acts are perpetrated by the State or by private persons.
