= United Nations Permanent Forum on Indigenous Issues =

UN coordinating body

- Abbreviation: UNPFII, PFII
- Formation: 28 July 2000; 26 years ago
- Type: Intergovernmental organization, Regulatory body, Advisory board
- Legal status: Active
- Headquarters: New York, USA
- Head: Chair of the Permanent Forum on Indigenous Issues; Anne Nuorgam
- Parent organization: United Nations Economic and Social Council
- Website: PFII on www.un.org

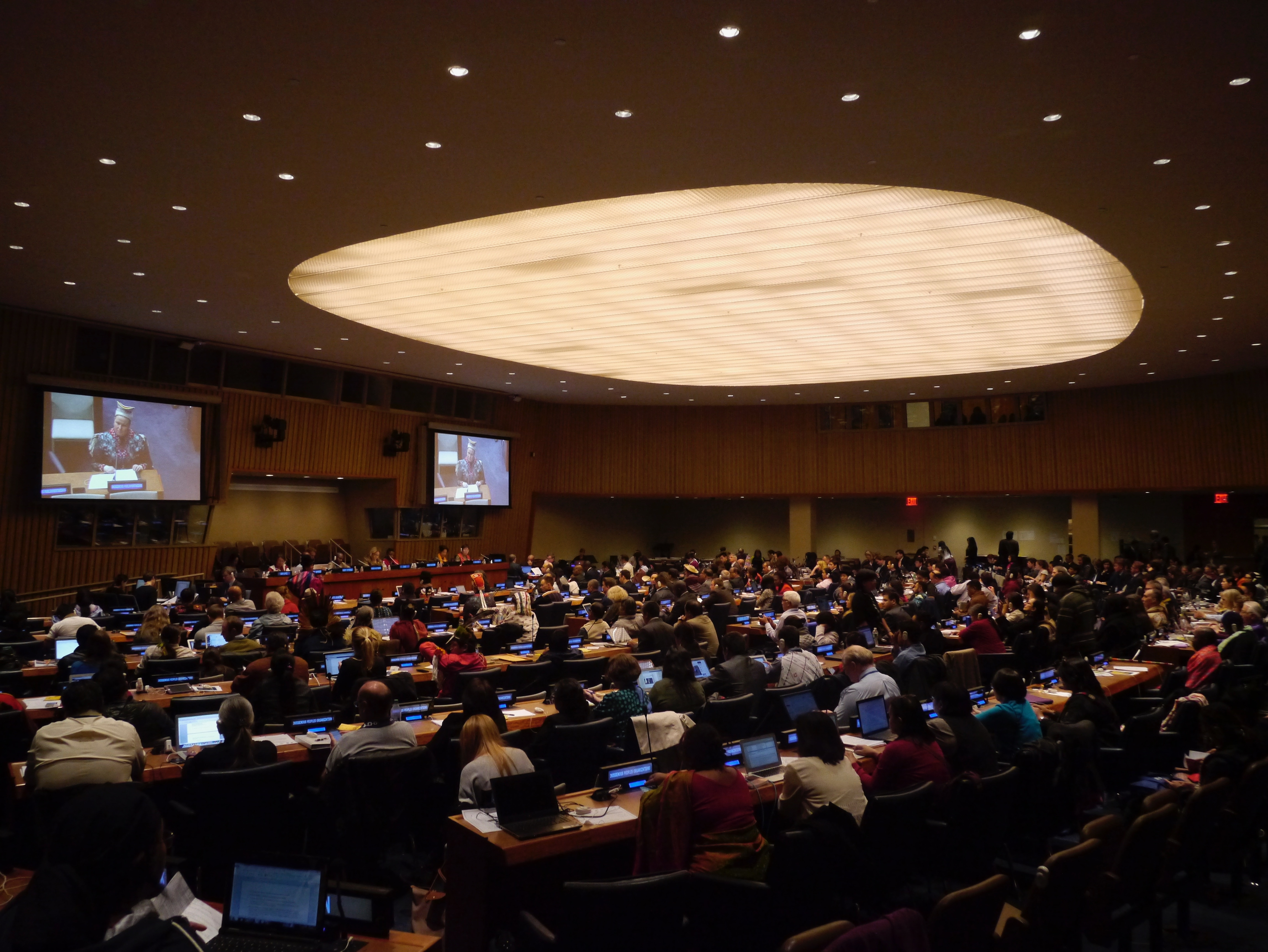
Plenary meeting of UNPFII (2015)

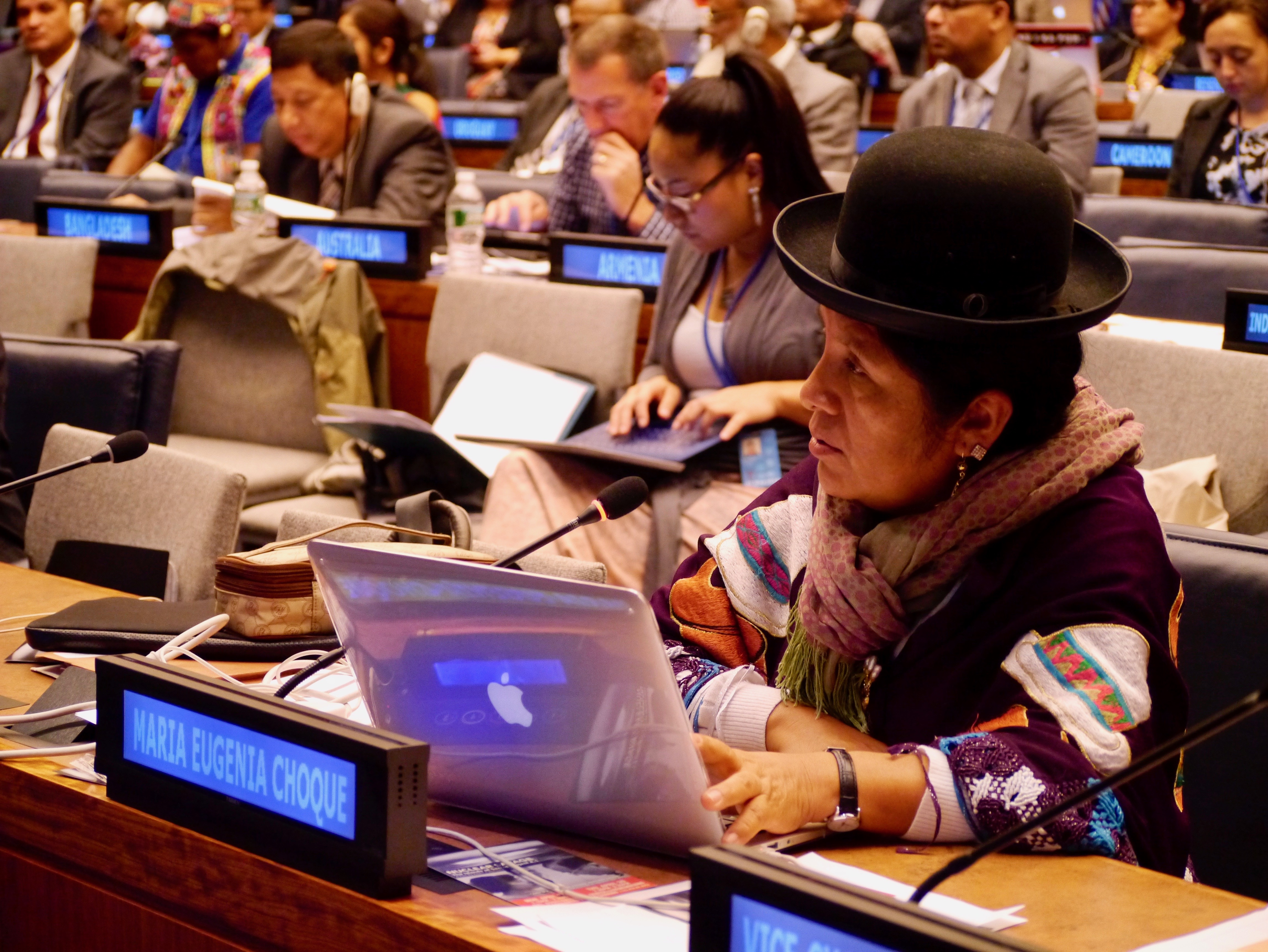
Maria Eugenia Choque Quispe, a member of the UN Permanent Forum on Indigenous Issues, speaks at the body's 2015 session.

Brenda White Bull, descendant of Sitting Bull, speaks at UN about fight against Dakota Access and State Violence, 25 April 2017.

The United Nations Permanent Forum on Indigenous Issues (UNPFII or PFII) is the UN's central coordinating body for matters relating to the concerns and rights of the world's indigenous peoples. There are more than 370 million indigenous people (also known as native, original, aboriginal and first peoples) in some 70 countries worldwide.

The forum was created in 2000 as an outcome of the UN's International Year for the World's Indigenous People in 1993, within the first International Decade of the World's Indigenous People (1995–2004). It is an advisory body within the framework of the United Nations System that reports to the UN's Economic and Social Council (ECOSOC).

== History ==
Resolution 45/164 of the United Nations General Assembly was adopted on 18 December 1990, proclaiming that 1993 would be the International Year for the World's Indigenous People, "with a view to strengthening international cooperation for the solution of problems faced by indigenous communities in areas such as human rights, the environment, development, education and health". The year was launched in Australia by Prime Minister Paul Keating's Redfern speech on 10 December 1992, in which he addressed Indigenous Australians' disadvantage.

The creation of the permanent forum was discussed at the 1993 World Conference on Human Rights in Vienna, Austria. The Vienna Declaration and Programme of Action recommended that such a forum should be established within the first United Nations International Decade of the World's Indigenous Peoples.

A working group was formed and various other meetings took place that led to the establishment of the permanent forum by Economic and Social Council Resolution 2000/22 on 28 July 2000.

== Functions and operation ==
It submits recommendations to the Council on issues related to indigenous peoples. It holds a two-week session each year which takes place at the United Nations Headquarters in New York City but it could also take place in Geneva or any other place as decided by the forum.

=== Mandate ===
The mandate of the Forum is to discuss indigenous issues related to economic and social development, culture, the environment, education, health and human rights. The forum is to:

- Provide expert advice and recommendations to the Economic and Social Council and to the various programmes, funds and agencies of the United Nations System through the Council;
- Raise awareness and promote the integration and coordination of activities related to indigenous issues within the UN system;
- Prepare and disseminate information on these issues.

== Members ==
The forum is composed of 16 independent experts, functioning in their personal capacity, who are appointed to three-year terms. At the end of their term, they can be re-elected or re-appointed for one additional term.

Of these 16 members, eight are nominated by the member governments and eight directly nominated by indigenous organizations. Those nominated by the governments are then elected to office by the Economic and Social Council based on the five regional groupings of the United Nations. Whereas those nominated by indigenous organisations are appointed by the President of the Economic and Social Council and represent the seven socio-cultural regions for broad representation of the world's indigenous peoples.

== Members of the Permanent Forum, January 2020 to December 2022 ==
Country of origin	Member	Region	Nominated by	Notes
Finland	Anne Nuorgam	Arctic	Indigenous Peoples' Organisations	Chair of the Permanent Forum
Nepal	Phoolman Chaudhary	Asia	Indigenous Peoples' Organizations	
Chad	Hindou Oumarou Ibrahim	Africa	Indigenous Peoples' Organizations	
Australia	Hannah McGlade	Pacific	Indigenous Peoples' Organizations	
Colombia	Darío José Mejía Montalvo	Latin America and Caribbean States	Indigenous Peoples' Organizations	
Bolivia	Simón Freddy Condo Riveros	Latin America and Caribbean States	Indigenous Peoples' Organizations	
United States	Geoffrey Roth	North America	Indigenous Peoples' Organizations	
Russia	Aleksei Tsykarev	Central and Eastern Europe, Russian Federation, Central Asia and Transcaucasia	Indigenous Peoples' Organizations	
China	Zhang Xiaoan	Asia-Pacific States	Governments	
Ecuador	Lourdes Tibán Guala	Latin America and the Caribbean	Governments	
Burundi	Vital Bambanze	Africa	Governments	
Denmark	Tove Søvndahl Gant	Western Europe and Other States	Governments	
Russia	Grigory Evguenievich Lukiyantsev	Central and Eastern Europe, Russian Federation, Central Asia and Transcaucasia	Governments	
Mexico	Irma Pineda Santiago	Latin America and the Caribbean	Governments	
Namibia	Bornface Museke Mate	Africa	Governments	
Estonia	Sven-Erik Soosaar	Western Europe and Other States	Governments	

== Sessions ==
To date, eighteen sessions have been held, all at UN Headquarters, New York:

Session	Dates	Theme
First Session	12–24 May 2002	
Second Session	11–23 May 2003	"Indigenous Children and Youth"
Third Session	10–21 May 2004	"Indigenous Women"
Fourth Session	16–27 May 2005	"Millennium Development Goals and Indigenous Peoples with a focus on Goal 1 to Eradicate Poverty and Extreme Hunger, and Goal 2 to achieve universal primary education"
Fifth Session	15–26 May 2006	"The Millennium Development Goals and indigenous peoples: Re-defining the Millennium Development Goals"
Sixth Session	14–25 May 2007	"Territories, Lands and Natural Resources"
Seventh Session	21 April – 2 May 2008	"Climate change, bio-cultural diversity and livelihoods: the stewardship role of indigenous peoples and new challenges"
Eight Session	18–29 May 2009	
Ninth Session	19–30 April 2010	"Indigenous peoples: development with culture and identity articles 3 and 32 of the United Nations Declaration on the Rights of Indigenous Peoples"
Tenth Session	16–27 May 2011	
Eleventh Session	7–18 May 2012	"The Doctrine of Discovery: its enduring impact on indigenous peoples and the right to redress for past conquests (articles 28 and 37 of the United Nations Declaration on the Rights of Indigenous Peoples)"
Twelfth Session	20–31 May 2013	
Thirteenth Session	12–23 May 2014	"Principles of good governance consistent with the United Nations Declaration on the Rights of Indigenous Peoples: articles 3 to 6 and 46"
Fourteenth Session	20 April – 1 May 2015	
Fifteenth Session	9–20 May 2016	"Indigenous peoples: conflict, peace and resolution"
Sixteenth Session	24 April – 5 May 2017	"Tenth Anniversary of the United Nations Declaration on the Rights of Indigenous Peoples: measures taken to implement the Declaration"
Seventeenth Session	16–27 April 2018	"Indigenous peoples' collective rights to lands, territories and resources"
Eighteenth Session	22 April – 3 May 2019	"Traditional knowledge: Generation, transmission and protection"
Nineteenth Session	13–24 April 2020	"Peace, justice and strong institutions: the role of indigenous peoples in implementing Sustainable Development Goal 16"
Twentieth Session	19–30 April 2021	"Peace, justice and strong institutions: the role of indigenous peoples in implementing Sustainable Development Goal 16"
Twenty-first Session	25 April – 6 May 2022	"Indigenous peoples, business, autonomy and the human rights principles of due diligence including free, prior and informed consent"
Twenty-second Session	17–28 April 2023	"Indigenous Peoples, human health, planetary and territorial health and climate change: a rights-based approach"
Twenty-third Session	15–26 April 2024	"Enhancing Indigenous Peoples' right to self-determination in the context of the United Nations Declaration on the Rights of Indigenous Peoples: emphasizing the voices of Indigenous youth"

== Secretariat ==
The Secretariat of the PFII was established by the General Assembly in 2002 with Resolution 57/191. It is based in New York within the Division for Inclusive Social Development (DISD) of the (DESA). The Secretariat, among other things, prepares the annual sessions of the Forum, provides support and assistance to the Forum's members, promotes awareness of indigenous issues within the UN system, governments and the public, and serves as a source of information and a coordination point for indigenous-related efforts.

== International Decade of the World's Indigenous People ==
=== First Decade ===
The first International Decade of the World's Indigenous People, "Indigenous People: Partnership in Action" (1995–2004), was proclaimed by General Assembly resolution 48/163 with the main objective of strengthening international cooperation for the solution of problems faced by indigenous peoples in areas such as human rights, environment, development, health and education.

=== Second Decade ===
The Second International Decade of the World's Indigenous People, "Partnership for Action and Dignity" (2005–2015), was proclaimed by the General Assembly at its 59th session, and the programme of action was adopted at the 60th session.

Its objectives are:

- Promoting non-discrimination and inclusion
- Full and effective participation in decision-making
- Re-define development policy from a vision of social equality
- Adopt targeted policies with emphasis on special groups (women, children and youth)
- Develop strong monitoring mechanisms and enhance accountability at all levels to protect the rights of indigenous peoples.

=== Decade of Indigenous Languages (2022–2032) ===
On 28 February 2020, 500 participants of a high-level assembly adopted the "Los Pinos Declaration" which concentrates on the indigenous language users' human rights.

== Regional groupings ==
To ensure diversity, members are elected from different regions depending on who nominated them:

- The United Nations Regional Groups are used for the eight members nominated by governments and elected by the Economic and Social Council:
  - African Group
  - Asia-Pacific Group
  - Eastern Europe Group
  - Latin America and the Caribbean Group
  - Western Europe and Other States Group
- The seven socio-cultural regions are used for the eight nominated by indigenous organisations and appointed by the President of the Economic and Social Council:
  - Africa
  - Asia
  - Central and South America and the Caribbean
  - The Arctic
  - Central and Eastern Europe, Russian Federation, Central Asia and Transcaucasia
  - North America
  - The Pacific
    - Note: Of the eight members nominated by indigenous organizations one must come from each of the seven regions, with one additional rotating seat among the first three first listed above.

== See also ==
- Declaration on the Rights of Indigenous Peoples
- Indigenous Peoples Climate Change Assessment Initiative
- International Day of the World's Indigenous Peoples
