= Vienna Declaration and Programme of Action =

Human rights declaration

The Vienna Declaration and Programme of Action (VDPA) is a human rights declaration adopted by consensus at the World Conference on Human Rights on 25 June 1993 in Vienna, Austria. The position of United Nations High Commissioner for Human Rights was recommended by this Declaration and subsequently created by General Assembly Resolution 48/141.

== Content ==
=== Right to seek asylum and humanitarian aid ===
In Part I, para 23, the VDPA reaffirms that everyone, without distinction of any kind, is entitled to the right to seek and enjoy in other countries asylum from persecution, as well as the right to return to one's own country. In this respect it stresses the importance of the Universal Declaration of Human Rights, the 1951 Convention relating to the Status of Refugees, its 1967 Protocol and regional instruments. It expresses its appreciation to States that continue to admit and host large numbers of refugees in their territories, and to the Office of the United Nations High Commissioner for Refugees for its dedication to its task. It also expresses its appreciation to the United Nations Relief and Works Agency for Palestine Refugees in the Near East. The VDPA recognises that, in view of the complexities of the global refugee crisis and in accordance with the Charter of the United Nations, relevant international instruments and international solidarity and in the spirit of burden-sharing, a comprehensive approach by the international community is needed in coordination and cooperation with the countries concerned and relevant organisations, bearing in mind the mandate of the United Nations High Commissioner for Refugees. This should include the development of strategies to address the root causes and effects of movements of refugees and other displaced persons, the strengthening of emergency preparedness and response mechanisms, the provision of effective protection and assistance, bearing in mind the special needs of women and children, as well as the achievement of durable solutions, primarily through the preferred solution of dignified and safe voluntary repatriations, including solutions such as those adopted by the international refugee conferences. And underlines the responsibilities of States, particularly as they relate to the countries of origin. Regarding disasters, in accordance with the Charter of the United Nations and the principles of humanitarian law, VDPA emphasizes the importance of and the need for humanitarian aid to victims of all natural disaster and man-made disaster.

=== Against racism, xenophobia and intolerance ===
In Part II, para 20, the VDPA urges all governments to take immediate measure and to develop strong policies to prevent and combat all forms and manifestations of racism, xenophobia or related intolerance, where necessary by enactment of appropriate legislation, including penal measure. And also appeals to all States parties to the International Convention on the Elimination of All Forms of Racial Discrimination to consider making the declaration under article 14 of the convention. The continuing rise of nativism, xenophobia, and racism led to a limited definition of what it meant to be an American. Many women fought against racist policies and beliefs, often risking their own personal safety. Un until the progressive movement there was no push to get xenophobia and racism out of society figures.

=== Persons belonging to minority groups ===
In Part II, para 25, the VDPA calls on the Commission on Human Rights to examine ways and means to promote and protect effectively the rights of persons belonging to minorities as set out in the Declaration on the Rights of Persons Belonging to National or Ethnic, Religious and Linguistic Minorities. In this context, VDPA calls upon the Centre for Human Rights to provide, at the request of Governments concerned and as part of its programme of advisory services and technical assistance, qualified expertise on minority issues and human rights, as well as on the prevention and resolution of disputes, to assist in existing or potential situations involving minorities. At para 26, the VDPA urges States and the international community to promote and protect the rights of persons belonging to national or ethnic, religious and linguistic minorities in accordance with the Declaration on the Rights of Persons belonging to National or Ethnic, Religious and Linguistic Minorities. Further at para 95, VDPA underlines the importance of preserving and strengthening the system of special procedures, rapporteurs, representatives, experts and working groups of the Commission on Human Rights and the Sub-Commission on the Prevention of Discrimination and Protection of Minorities, in order to enable them to carry out their mandates in all countries throughout the world, providing them with the necessary human and financial resources. The procedures and mechanisms should be enabled to harmonize and rationalize their work through periodic meeting. All States are asked to cooperate fully with these procedures and mechanisms. Freedom from arbitrary and respect of human rights.

=== Indigenous peoples ===
In Part II, para 29, the VDPA recommends that the Commission on Human Rights consider the renewal and updating of the mandate of the Working Group on Indigenous Populations upon complement of the drafting of the Declaration on the Rights of Indigenous Peoples. Further at para 32, it recommends that the General Assembly proclaim an international decade of the world's indigenous people, to begin from January 1994, including action oriented programmes, to be decided upon in partnership with indigenous people. An appropriate voluntary trust fund should be set up for this purpose. In the framework of such a decade, the establishment of a permanent forum for indigenous peoples in the United Nations system should be considered.

=== Rights of migrant workers ===
In Part II, para 34, the VDPA invites States to consider the possibility of signing and ratifying on the earliest possible time, the United Nations Convention on the Protection of the Rights of All Migrant Workers and Members of Their Families. Migrant workers were used almost as slaves and forced into terrible working conditions and labor hours. They were used as the brunt end of the workforce and in the case of women it only got worse. until the Beijing conferences where companies started to notice the changes in society, and that women migrants suffered more than male migrants.

=== Women's rights and domestic violence ===
The VDPA, at Part II, para 38, also calls upon the General Assembly to adopt the draft Declaration on the Elimination of Violence Against Women and urges States to combat violence against women in accordance with its provisions, and that "violations of the human rights of women in situations of armed conflict are violations of the fundamental principles of international human rights and humanitarian law. All violations of this kind, including in particular murder, systematic rape, sexual slavery, and forced pregnancy, require a particular effective response."

=== Rights of the child ===
In Part II, para 45, the VDPA reiterates the principle of "First Call for Children" and, in this respect, underlines the importance of major national and international efforts, especially those of the United Nations Children's Fund, for promoting respect for the rights of the child to survival, protection, development and participation. At para 46, VDPA affirms that measures should be taken to achieve universal ratification of the Convention on the Rights of the Child by 1995 and the universal signing of the "World Declaration on the Survival, Protection and Development of Children and Plan of Action" adopted by the World Summit for Children.

At para 47, the VDPA urges all nations to undertake measures to the maximum extent of their available resources, with the support of international cooperation, to achieve the goals in the World Summit Plan of Action, and calls on States to integrate the Convention on the Rights of the Child into their national action plans. By means of those national action plans and through international efforts, particular priority should be places on reducing infant mortality and maternal mortality rates, reducing malnutrition and illiteracy rates and providing access to safe drinking water and to basic education. Whenever so called for, national plans of action should be devised to combat devastating emergencies resulting from natural disasters and armed conflicts and the equally grave problem of children in extreme poverty.

At para 48, the VDPA urges all States, to address the acute program of children under difficult circumstance. Exploitation and abuse of children should be actively combated, including by addressing their root causes. Effective measure are required against female infanticide, harmful child labour, sale of children and organ, child prostitution, child pornography, as well as other forms of sexual abuse.

At para 50, the VDPA strongly supports the proposal that the Secretary General initiate a study into means of improving the protection of children in armed conflicts, and that humanitarian norms should be implemented and measures taken in order to protect and facilitate assistance to children in war zone. Measures should include protection for children against indiscriminate use of all weapon of war, especially anti-personnel mines. The need for aftercare and rehabilitation of children traumatized by war must be addressed urgently.

=== Freedom from torture ===
In Part II, para 54, the VDAP welcomes the ratification by many Member States of the United Nations Convention Against Torture and at para 61, also reaffirm that effort to eradicate torture should, first and foremost, be concentrated on prevention and, therefore, calls for early adoption of an Optional Protocol to the Convention against Torture, which is intended to establish a preventive system of regular visits to places of detention. The Universal Declaration of human rights which is enforced by the Vienna Declaration, holds that "No one shall be subjected to torture or too cruel, inhuman or degrading treatment or punishment". Before this Women have been subjected to "torture" all the way up into the 1940s. Since women didn't have equal rights at the time they were held accountable to "savage and primitive" accounts of treatment. Later on the VDAP found that this "torture" of women was unlawful. swell in the twelve concerns in the Beijing platform tourture was one of the main concerns touched on by those that got the chance to convey their stories.

=== Enforced disappearances ===
In Part II, para 62, the VDPA welcoming the adoption by the General Assembly of the Declaration on the Protection of All Persons from Enforced Disappearance, calls upon all States to take effective legislative, administrative, judicial on other measure to prevent, terminate and punish acts of enforced disappearance. This is the origin of the International Convention for the Protection of All Persons from Enforced Disappearance.

=== Rights of the disabled person ===
In Part II, para 63, the VDAP reaffirms that all human rights and fundamental freedoms are universal and thus unreservedly include persons with disabilities. Every person is born equal and has the same rights to life and welfare, education and work, living independently and active participation in all aspects of society. Any direct discrimination or other negative discriminatory treatment of a disabled person is therefore a violation of his or her rights. At para 64, the VDAP affirms that the place of disabled person is everywhere. Persons with disabilities should be guaranteed equal opportunity through the elimination of all socially determined barriers, be they physical, financial, social or psychological, which exclude or restrict full participation in society.

=== Human rights, the responsibility of the State ===
On ratification of international treaties on human rights, the VDPA states in Part I, para 26 that it "welcomes the progress made in the codification of human rights instruments, which is a dynamic and evolving process, and urges the universal ratification of human rights treaties. All States are encouraged to accede to these international instruments; all States are encouraged to avoid, as far as possible, the resort to reservations." On remedy and redress of human rights violation, VDPA states in Part I, para 27 that "Every State should provide an effective framework of remedies and redress human rights grievances or violations. The administration of justice, including law enforcement and prosecutorial agencies and, especially, an independent judiciary and legal profession in full conformity with applicable standards contained in international human rights instruments, are essential to the full and non-discriminatory realization of human rights and indispensable to the processes of democracy and sustainable development."

=== Human rights education ===
In Part II, para 78, the VDPA considers human rights education, training and public information essential for the promotion and achievement of stable and harmonious relations among communities and for fostering mutual understanding, tolerance and peace. At para 79 it states that States should strive to eradicate illiteracy and should direct education towards the full development of the human personality and to the strengthening of respect for human rights and fundamental freedoms. The VDPA calls on all States and institutions to include international human rights law, international humanitarian law, democracy and rule of law as subjects in the curricula of all learning institutions in formal and non-formal settings, and, at para 80, that human rights education should include peace, democracy, development and social justice, as set forth in international and regional human rights instruments, in order to achieve common understanding and awareness with a view to strengthening universal commitment to human rights. Further at para 81, the VDPA states that taking into account the World Plan of Action on Education for Human Rights and Democracy, adopted in March 1993 by the International Congress on Education for Human Rights and Democracy of the United Nations Educational, Scientific and Cultural Organization, and other human rights instruments, the VDPA recommends that States develop specific programs and strategies for ensuring the widest human rights education and the dissemination of public information, taking particular account of the human rights needs of women.

=== Implementation and monitoring methods ===
In Part II, para 83, the VDPA urges Governments to incorporate standard as contained in international human rights instruments in domestic legislation and to strengthen national structures, institutions and organs of society which play a role in protecting and safeguarding human rights. Para 84 recommends the strengthening of United Nations activities and programmes to meet requests for assistance by States which want to establish or strengthen their own national human rights institutions for promotion and protection of human rights.

At Part II, para 92, the VDPA recommends that the Commission on Human Rights examine the possibility for better implementation of existing human rights instruments at the international and regional levels and encourages the International Law Commission to continue its work on an International Criminal Court. Para 93 appeals to states which have not yet done so that accede to the Geneva Conventions of 12 August 1949 and the Protocols thereto, and to take all appropriate national measures, including legislative ones, for their full implementation. Para 96 recommends that the United Nations assume a more active role in the promotion and protection of human rights in ensuring full respect for international humanitarian law in all situations of armed conflict, in accordance with the purposes and principles of Charter of the United Nations. At para 97, the VDPA, recognizing the important role of human rights components in specific arrangements concerning some Peacekeeping Operations by United Nations, recommends that the Secretary-General take into account the reporting, experience and capabilities of the Centre for Human Rights and human rights mechanisms, in conformity with the Charter of the United Nations.

== Follow-up ==
Part II, para 99 The World Conference on Human Rights on Human Rights recommends that the General Assembly, the Commission on Human Rights and other organs and agencies of the United Nations system related to human rights consider ways and means for the full implementation, without delay, of the recommendations contained in the present Declaration, including the possibility of proclaiming a United Nations decade for human rights. The World Conference on Human Rights further recommends that the Commission on Human Rights annually review the progress towards this end.

Para 100:The World Conference on Human Rights requests the Secretary-General of the United Nations to invite on the occasion of the fiftieth anniversary of the Universal Declaration of Human Rights all States, all organs and agencies of the United Nations system related to human rights, to report to him on the progress made in the implementation of the present Declaration and to submit a report to the General Assembly at its fifty-third session, through the Commission on Human Rights and the Economic and Social Council. Likewise, regional and, as appropriate, national human rights institutions, as well as non-governmental may present their views to the Secretary-General on the progress made in the implementation of the present Declaration. Special attention should be paid to assessing the progress towards the goal of universal ratification of international human rights treaties and protocols adopted within the framework of the United Nations system.

=== United Nations Human Rights Council ===
The United Nations Human Rights Council holds regular debates (under its agenda item 8) on follow-up to the VDPA. While the scope of issues that can be addressed under this heading was initially disputed, recent sessions of the Human Rights Council have shown increasing debate on systematic follow-up to the VDPA, with States and non-governmental organizations raising a broad range of issues, reflecting the universal scope of the VDPA. This included themes like gender equality, sexual orientation and gender identity and institutional issues such as the independence of the Office of the UN High Commissioner for Human Rights (OHCHR).

In September 2012, the Human Rights Council decided to hold a panel debate, in March 2013, to commemorate the 20th anniversary of the VDPA.

== See also ==
- International human rights law
- International humanitarian law
- International human rights instruments
- Rule of law
- Social justice
- Human rights education
- Three generations of human rights
- United Nations Millennium Declaration
