= International Day of the World's Indigenous Peoples =

Annual observation created by the United Nations

International Day of the World's Indigenous People
- Date: 9 August (annually)
- Location: Global

The International Day of the World's Indigenous Peoples is observed on 9 August each year to raise awareness and protect the rights of the world's indigenous population. This event also recognizes the achievements and contributions that indigenous people make to improve world issues such as environmental protection. It was first pronounced by the United Nations General Assembly in December 1994, marking the day of the first meeting of the UN Working Group on Indigenous Populations of the Sub-Commission on the Promotion and Protection of Human Rights in 1982.

== History ==
In 1990 the General Assembly of the United Nations adopted a resolution to make 1993 the International Year of the World's Indigenous Peoples.

The International Day of the World's Indigenous Peoples was first pronounced by the United Nations (UN) General Assembly in December 1994, to be celebrated every year during the first International Decade of the World's Indigenous Peoples (1995–2004). In 2004, the Assembly proclaimed a Second International Decade, from 2005–2015, with the theme of "A Decade for Action and Dignity". People from different nations are encouraged to participate in observing the day to spread the UN's message on Indigenous peoples. Activities may include educational forums and classroom activities to gain an appreciation and a better understanding of Indigenous peoples.

By resolution 49/214 of 23 December 1994, the United Nations General Assembly decided that the International Day of the World's Indigenous People shall be observed on 9 August every year during the International Decade of the World's Indigenous People. The date marks the day of the first meeting, in 1982, of the UN Working Group on Indigenous Populations of the Sub-Commission on the Promotion and Protection of Human Rights.

== International Year of Indigenous Languages 2019 ==
In the year 2016, it was reported that about 2,680 indigenous languages were in danger and on the verge of becoming extinct. Hence, the UN designated 2019 the International Year of Indigenous Languages to persuade, convince, and create awareness among people about indigenous languages.

== Symbols ==
Artwork by Rebang Dewan, a Chakma boy from Bangladesh, was chosen as the visual identifier of the UN Permanent Forum on Indigenous Issues. It has also been seen on material to promote the International Day of the World's Indigenous Peoples. It features two ears of green leaves facing each other and a globe resembling Earth. Within the globe is a picture of a handshake (two different hands) in the middle, and above the handshake is a landscape background. The handshake and the landscape background are encapsulated by blue at the top and bottom of the globe.

== Celebration in Canada ==
International Day of the World's Indigenous Peoples is celebrated as an all-nations community celebration with artists, speakers, poets, performers, and a wide range of vendors and community service booths in Kingston, Ontario, by Ollin.

== Celebration in Taiwan ==
In 2016, the administration under President Tsai Ing-wen approved a proposal that designated 1 August as Indigenous Peoples' Day in Taiwan. In celebration of the special day, President Tsai issued an official apology to the country's aboriginal people and outlined steps to promote legislation further and involve organizations related to aboriginal causes, like the Presidential Office's Indigenous Historical Justice and Transitional Justice Committee. The government hopes the day will remind the public of the diverse ethnic groups in Taiwan by bringing greater respect for indigenous peoples' cultures and history and promoting their rights.

== See also ==
- Indigenous peoples
- Indigenous Peoples' Day
- National Indigenous Peoples Day
