= Global Implementation Plan to End Violence against Women and Girls =

UN Women ONU Femmes ONU Mujeres
- Formation: 2010
- Type: UN entity
- Headquarters: New York City, United States
- Official languages: 4: English; French
- Head: Michelle Bachelet
- Website: www.unwomen.org

The Global Implementation Plan to End Violence Against Women and Girls was a recommendation from the multi-agency Expert Group Meeting (EGM) on the prevention of violence against women and girls. The meeting was convened as part of the United Nations Commission on the Status of Women's multi-year programme of work for 2010–2014.

The "Elimination and prevention of all forms of violence against women and girls" formed a priority theme for its fifty-seventh session in 2013 (CSW57).

== Background ==
The EGM took place in Bangkok, Thailand, 17–20 September 2012 and was organised by the United Nations Entity for Gender Equality and the Empowerment of Women (UN Women), in collaboration with the following organisations:

- United Nations Economic and Social Commission for Asia and the Pacific (ESCAP);
- United Nations Development Programme (UNDP);
- United Nations Population Fund (UNFPA);
- United Nations Children’s Fund (UNICEF); and
- World Health Organization (WHO).

The report that the meeting produced reflected the shared discussion and analysis of the major issues, gaps and challenges identified at the EGM and presented key findings and recommendations. It was intended to build on the individual papers on specific issues provided by experts prior to the meeting, and the background paper prepared by the rapporteur. It provided inputs for the reports of the Secretary-General to the CSW and was widely disseminated in preparation to the fifty-seventh session of CSW.

Recommendations 106 - 109 of the EGM calls for a global plan to be launched by 2015, to end violence against women and girls organised along these lines:

Recommendation 109
The Global Implementation Plan to End Violence against Women and Girls, endorsed and supported by Member States at its launch, would aim to:

1. Intensify and scale-up global awareness of violence against women and girls as a global emergency.
2. Combine the best thinking on how to proceed with concrete pledges for action.
3. Mobilise international, regional and national action by governments, multilaterals, the private sector and civil society.
4. Build the foundation for an evidence and practice-informed global prevention strategy.
5. Increase resources available to end violence against women and girls.

Recommendation 111
Development of the plan would require, among other things:

1. Identification of a small set of key policy, legal and programme-delivery targets (institutions) at the national level towards which global violence prevention efforts can be directed.
2. Detailed review of existing action plans, indicators, recommendations, platforms for action, policy agendas, and recommendations outlined by the Security Council, UN Treaty bodies, the special rapporteurs, and various UN agencies, with a view to closing implementation gaps and building the next stage.
3. Creation of a cohesive global community of key stakeholders.
4. Designation of strong coordinating mechanisms.
5. Development of an accountability framework with indicators to measure State responsiveness to the policy, legal and programme-delivery goals identified and an independent monitoring mechanism.

== United Nations Commission on the Status of Women - fifty-seventh session ==
The fifty-seventh session of the United Nations Commission on the Status of Women took place at the UN building, New York between 4 and 15 March 2013. The agreed conclusions from the session agreed the following four actions:

1. Strengthening implementation of legal and policy frameworks and accountability.
2. Addressing structural and underlying causes and risk factors so as to prevent violence against women and girls.
3. Strengthening multisectorial services, programmes and responses to violence against women and girls.
4. Improving the evidence-base.

UN Women's Executive Director Michelle Bachelet urged speedy implementation of the Agreed Conclusions saying, "The best way to honour the commitments made by Member States at the Commission is to work for implementation and accountability."

== See also ==
- Gender Equality Architecture Reform
- NGO CSW/NY
- United Nations Security Council Resolution 1325
- United Nations International Research and Training Institute for the Advancement of Women
- United Nations Development Fund for Women
- Women's rights
- Declaration on the Elimination of Discrimination against Women
- Declaration on the Elimination of Violence Against Women
- Convention on preventing and combating violence against women and domestic violence
- CEDAW
