= EGM: prevention of violence against women and girls =

United Nations commission

UN Women ONU Femmes ONU Mujeres
- Formation: 2010
- Type: UN entity
- Headquarters: New York City, United States
- Official languages: 4: English; French
- Head: Michelle Bachelet
- Website: www.unwomen.org

EGM logo

The Expert Group Meeting (EGM): prevention of violence against women and girls was convened as part of the United Nations Commission on the Status of Women's multi-year programme of work for 2010–2014. The "Elimination and prevention of all forms of violence against women and girls" forms a priority theme for its fifty-seventh session in 2013 (CSW57). The meeting took place in Bangkok, Thailand, 17–20 September 2012 and was organised by the United Nations Entity for Gender Equality and the Empowerment of Women (UN Women), in collaboration with the following organisations:

- United Nations Economic and Social Commission for Asia and the Pacific (ESCAP);
- United Nations Development Programme (UNDP);
- United Nations Population Fund (UNFPA);
- United Nations Children's Fund (UNICEF) and;
- World Health Organization (WHO).

== Participants ==
Experts
NAME	ORGANISATION
Sunila Abeysekera	INFORM, Sri Lanka
Mary Carroll Ellsberg	International Center for Research of Women, USA
Marai Larasi	Ending Violence Against Women Coalition, UK
Lori Lynn Heise	Tackling the Structural Drivers of HIV (STRIVE), USA
Tatiana Moura	PROMUNDO, Brazil
Mallika Dutt	Breakthrough, India
Edwina Kotoisuva	Fiji Women's Crisis Centre, Fiji
Lori Michau	Raising Voices, Uganda
Dean Peacock	Sonke Gender Justice, South Africa
Dubravka Šimonović	Member of the Committee on the Elimination of Discrimination against Women (CEDAW)
Jean Ward	Independent Consultant, Kenya
Fatuma Chegue	School of Education, Kenyatta University, Kenya
Margareta Grape	UN Office of the World Council of Churches
Yasmeen Hassan	Equality Now, USA
Henriette Jansen	Independent Consultant, Fiji
Hibaaq Osman	ED Kamara, N.Africa/M.East
Nandita Bhatla	International Centre for Research on Women Asia Regional office (ICRW)
Keshan Latchman	UNiTE Global Youth, Trinidad Tobago
Molly Melching	TOSTAN, Senegal

Consultant
NAME	ORGANISATION
Lara Fergus	Independent Consultant, Australia

Observers
NAME	ORGANISATION
Nanette Braun	Social Media and Communications, UN Women
James Lang	Partners for Prevention (UNDP, UNFPA, UN Women & UNV Regional Joint Programme for Asia and the Pacific)
Emma Fulu	Partners for Prevention (UNDP, UNFPA, UN Women & UNV Regional Joint Programme for Asia and the Pacific)
Soon-Young Yoon	UN representative for International Alliance of Women
Carole Shaw	Asia Pacific Women's Watch
Gail Farngalo	Government of Liberia
Sofia Dohmen	Swedish SIDA
Kathryn Lockett	DfID

UN System
NAME	ORGANISATION
Roberta Clarke	Director, Regional Office for Asia and the Pacific, UN Women
Nanda Krairiksh	Director, ESCAP Social Development Division
Saraswathi Menon	Director, Policy Division, UN Women
Ramanathan Balakrishnan	Deputy Director, Regional Office for Asia and the Pacific, UN Women
Kalliopi Mingeirou	UN Women
Tania Farah	UN Women
Shoko Ishikawa	UN Women, Regional Office for Asia and the Pacific
Meryem Aslan	UN Trust Fund to End Violence Against Women
Aldijana Sisic	Secretary-General Campaign UNiTE to End Violence Against Women
Clarice Da Silva E Paula	UNICEF
Upala Devi	UNFPA
Riet Groenen	UNFPA Asia Pacific Regional Office
Avni Amina	WHO
Suki Beavers	UNDP
Cai Cai	ESCAP
Jori Jorgensen	ESCAP
Heike Alefsen	OHCHR
Anna-Karin Jatfors	UNiTE Campaign, Asia Pacific
Sara De La Pena Espin	UN Women, Regional Office for Asia and the Pacific
Nelien Haspels	ILO
Claudia Baroni	UNODC

== See also ==
- CEDAW
- Convention on preventing and combating violence against women and domestic violence
- Declaration on the Elimination of Discrimination against Women
- Declaration on the Elimination of Violence Against Women
- Gender Equality Architecture Reform
- Global Implementation Plan to End Violence against Women and Girls
- NGO CSW/NY
- United Nations Development Fund for Women
- United Nations International Research and Training Institute for the Advancement of Women
- United Nations Security Council Resolution 1325
- Women's rights
