= UN Women =

International organization

- Formation: 2 July 2010; 16 years ago
- Type: UN entity
- Headquarters: New York City, United States
- Official languages: 6: English; French; Spanish; Chinese; Arabic; Russian
- Head: Sima Sami Bahous
- Website: unwomen.org

The United Nations Entity for Gender Equality and the Empowerment of Women (UN Women) was established by a merger of the UN Development Fund for Women (UNIFEM, established in 1976) and other agencies and became operational in 2011. The organization operates under a governance structure and has an executive board representing different regions. Former President of Chile Michelle Bachelet was its inaugural executive director and Jordanian Sima Sami Bahous is its current executive director. UN Women is a member of the UN Development Group.

== History ==
In response to UN General Assembly resolution 63/311, in January 2010 the Secretary-General presented report A/64/588, entitled Comprehensive Proposal for the Composite Agency for Gender Equality and the Empowerment of Women. In his report, the Secretary-General resolved that, rather than relieving other parts of the United Nations system of their responsibility for contributing to the promotion of gender equality and women's empowerment, the new agency should seek to sharpen the focus and impact of the gender equality activities of the entire United Nations system. Additionally, Secretary-General Ban Ki-moon estimated that approximately $125 million per annum were needed for operating costs and "start-up" capacity at the country, regional, and headquarters levels. Moreover, an additional $375 million per annum were needed in the initial phase to respond to country-level requests for programmatic support.

After years of negotiations between UN member states, women's groups, and civil society, on 2 July 2010 the General Assembly unanimously adopted resolution 64/289, thus creating UN Women by merging the Division for the Advancement of Women (DAW); the International Research and Training Institute for the Advancement of Women (INSTRAW, established in 1976); the Office of the Special Adviser on Gender Issues and Advancement of Women (OSAGI, established in 1997), and the UN Development Fund for Women (UNIFEM, established in 1976). Secretary-General Ban Ki-moon announced at the founding of the movement that he was "grateful to Member States for having taken this major step forward for the world's women and girls. UN Women will significantly boost UN efforts to promote gender equality, expand opportunity, and tackle discrimination around the globe."

On 14 September 2010, it was announced that former President of Chile Michelle Bachelet was appointed as head of UN Women. Various countries supported the creation of the body and welcomed Bachelet as chief. During General Debate at the opening of the 65th General Assembly, world leaders commended the creation of the body and its intention to "empower women", as well as welcoming Bachelet as the inaugural head. On 11 March 2011, John Hendra of Canada and Lakshmi Puri of India were appointed as first deputy executive directors at the level of UN Assistant Secretary-General.

The provisions set forth by resolution 63/311 on system-wide coherence, adopted by the General Assembly on 2 October 2010, constituted the blueprint for UN Women. Seeking to strengthen the UN's institutional arrangements for gender equality and women empowerment, resolution 63/311 supported the consolidation of four distinct parts of the UN system that focused exclusively on gender equality and women's empowerment into a composite entity to be led by an Under-Secretary-General. Moreover, the resolution requested that the Secretary-General produce a proposal specifying the mission statement of the composite entity and its organizational arrangements, including an organizational chart, funding, and the executive board to oversee its operational activities.

== Structure and functioning ==
Resolution 64/289 determined that the entity should be headed by an Under-Secretary-General, to be appointed by the Secretary-General in consultation with member states, for a term of four years, with the possibility of renewal for one term.

The organization is governed by a multi-tiered intergovernmental governance structure in charge of providing normative and operational policy guidance. The General Assembly, Economic and Social Council, and the Commission on the Status of Women (CSW) constitute the governance structure that sets forth the normative policy guiding principles of the Entity. The intergovernmental governance structure in charge of providing operational policy guidance to UN Women includes the General Assembly, the Economic and Social Council and the organization's executive board. The latter consist of 41 members, elected by the Economic and Social Council for a term of three years and distributed as follows:

- Ten from the Group of African States
- Ten from the Group of Asian States
- Four from the Group of Eastern European States
- Six from the Group of Latin American and Caribbean States
- Five from the Group of Western European and Other States
- Six from contributing countries. Four seats will be selected by and from the top ten largest providers of voluntary core contributions to UN Women. The remaining two seats will be allocated to two developing countries not members of the Development Assistance Committee of the Organisation for Economic Co-operation and Development (DAC/OECD). These two countries will be selected by the developing countries not members of the Development Assistance Committee among the top ten providers of voluntary core contributions to the entity.

The resources required to fund all normative processes are obtained from the Entity's regular budget and approved by the General Assembly, whereas the budget for service operational processes and activities at all levels are funded from voluntary contributions and approved by the executive board of UN Women.

=== Executive Board ===
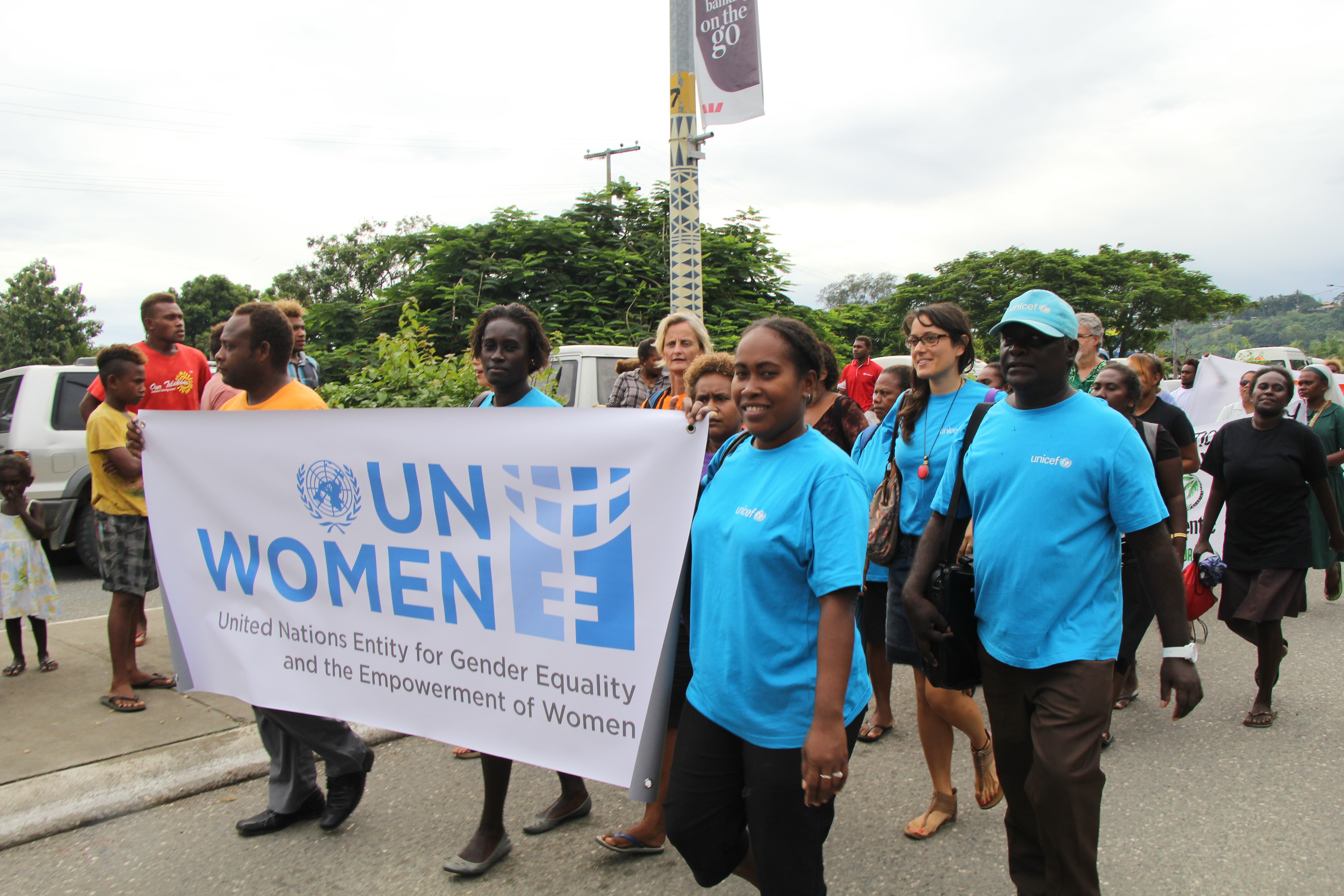
The IWD 2014 parade

Jordanian Sima Sami Bahous is the executive director of UN Women as of 2023. The 2020 executive board consists of:

- Africa: Angola, Burundi, Democratic Republic of Congo, Equatorial Guinea, Ghana, Kenya, Madagascar, Morocco, Nigeria, and Sierra Leone.
- Asia-Pacific: Bangladesh, China, India, Indonesia, Japan, Kazakhstan, Lebanon, Mongolia, Nepal, Republic of Korea, and Saudi Arabia.
- Eastern Europe: Georgia, Hungary, Lithuania, and Russia.
- Latin America and the Caribbean: Argentina, Brazil, Chile, Colombia, Cuba, and Mexico.
- Western Europe and other States: Belgium, Canada, Germany, New Zealand, Switzerland.
- Contributing countries: Finland, Senegal, Sweden, Turkey, United Kingdom, United States.

== Mandate ==
The mandate and functions of UN Women consist of the consolidated mandates and functions of the Office of the Special Adviser on Gender Issues and Advancement of Women, the Division for the Advancement of Women, the United Nations Development Fund for Women, and the International Research and Training Institute for the Advancement of Women. In addition, the entity must lead, coordinate, and promote the accountability of the United Nations system in its work on gender equality and women's empowerment. The goal of UN Women is to "enhance, not replace, efforts by other parts of the UN system (such as UNICEF, UNDP, and UNFPA), which will continue to have a responsibility to work for gender equality and women's empowerment in their areas of expertise."

In accordance with the provisions of resolution 64/289, UN Women is to work within the framework of the UN Charter and the Beijing Declaration and Platform for Action, including its 12 critical areas of concern and the outcome of the 23rd special session of the General Assembly, as well as other applicable UN instruments, standards, and resolutions that address gender equality and the empowerment and advancement of women.

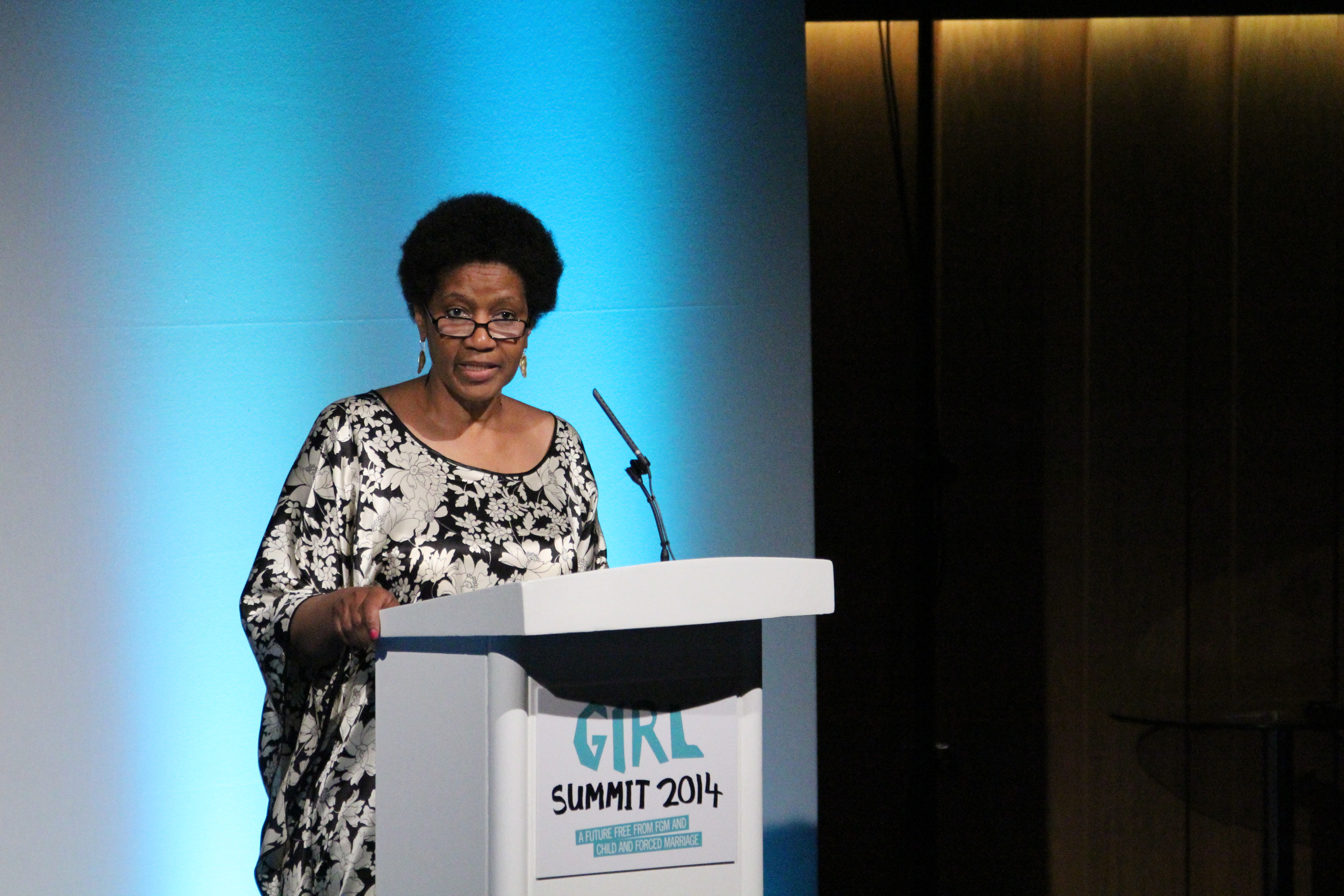
UN Women executive director Phumzile Mlambo-Ngcuka speaking at Girl Summit 2014

UN Women's main areas of work include:

- Leadership and political participation
- Economic empowerment
- Ending violence against women
- Humanitarian action
- Peace and security
- Governance and national planning
- The 2030 Agenda for Sustainable Development
- HIV and AIDS

In late 2013, a series of ads used genuine Google searches to reveal the widespread prevalence of sexism and discrimination against women The ads featured the faces of four women and where their mouths should be were Google auto-complete suggestions. The suggestions were all sexist or misogynist. A similar campaign was also run to raise awareness for gay rights.

UN Women promotes the rights of LGBTIQ people.

UN Women advocates an intersectional feminism.

Also in late 2013, UN Women launched a constitutional database that examines constitutions through a gender lens. The first of its kind, this database maps the principles and rules that guarantee, deny, or protect the rights of women and girls around the world. This tool for gender equality and human rights activists is annually updated and searchable, and provides a comprehensive overview of the current status of provisions relevant to women's rights and gender equality across various countries throughout the world. Users can search though the database by keyword, and legal provisions are grouped into 16 categories that were carefully defined by reviewing the constitutions from a human rights perspective.

UN Women is one of the lead agencies coordinating International Women's Day events as well as the Commission on the Status of Women.

The year 2015 marked a number of milestones, such as the 20th anniversary of the Fourth World Conference on Women and adoption of the Beijing Declaration and Platform for Action, which was the focus of the 59th session of the Commission on the Status of Women (CSW59) from 9–20 March 2015, where global leaders took stock of progress and remaining challenges for implementing this landmark agreement for gender equality and women's rights. UN Women played an active role in major intergovernmental negotiations and processes including the Financing for Development Conference in Addis Ababa in July 2015, the outcome of which was strong on the need to adequately fund gender equality and incorporate it in development planning, as well as the negotiations and successful adoption of the new post-2015 development agenda on 25 September 2015. The new global development roadmap includes a stand-alone goal on gender equality and women's empowerment (Sustainable Development Goal 5), and mainstreams these priorities throughout all 17 goals.

According to the 2026 Gender Snapshot report jointly published by UN Women and the United Nations Department of Economic and Social Affairs (UN DESA), global gender equality could take another 171 years to achieve at the current rate of progress. The report also highlighted UN Women and UN DESA's call for greater female participation in political and economic decision-making, as well as increased financial support for gender equality institutions and women's rights organizations.

Sustainable Development Goal #5: Gender Equality

=== Goals ===
UN Women is empowered to:

- support intergovernmental bodies, such as the Commission on the Status of Women, in their formulation of policies, global standards, and norms
- help UN member states implement the above standards
- enable member states to hold the UN system accountable for its own commitments on gender equality, including regular monitoring of system-wide progress

== Criticism ==
=== Hamas attacks on women ===
Following the Hamas attack on Israel on 7 October 2023, women's rights groups criticized UN Women for not issuing a timely and clear condemnation of Hamas's gender-based war crimes on Israeli women. Sarah Weiss Maudi, senior adviser to the president of the 77th Session of the U.N. General Assembly, said that UN Women refused to acknowledge that atrocities were committed against Israeli women and young girls despite many of the atrocities having been filmed by Hamas and other Palestinian terrorists themselves.

On 13 October, an initial statement by UN Women condemned the attack on Israeli civilians but did not mention women. Subsequent posts and comments by the organization focused only on the impact of the conflict on Palestinian women. A month after the attack, the UN Women's website contained only one reference to women and girls stating the following, "devastating impact of the crisis in Gaza on women and girls". Michal Herzog, First Lady of Israel, criticized UN Women for having a "double standard" and has lobbied openly about the topic. Several women's rights groups criticized UN Women, as did Canadian Anne Bayefsky, director of the Touro University Institute on Human Rights and the Holocaust."

On 29 November, over 80 members of the U.S. House of Representatives accused UN Women of disregarding Hamas's gender based violence on Israeli females and minors in a bipartisan letter driven by Representatives Young Kim (R-California) and Sheila Cherfilus-McCormick (D-Florida). The 80 Representatives wrote to UN Women Executive Director Sima Bahous stating, "The failure by UN Women to publicly stand up for Israeli women and condemn Hamas' systematic atrocities undermines UN Women and highlights its one-sided approach."

UN Women states that it was one of the first organisations to condemn the attacks by Hamas and their use of gender-based violence. In regards to a deleted post condemning the Hamas attacks, a representative for UN Women gave a statement to the Jewish Telegraphic Agency saying, "In any social media team managing multiple campaigns and during a very busy time like the one we are now in with 16 Days of Activism, mistakes can occur."

Israel's ambassador to the UN criticized UN Women and UN Secretary-General António Guterres for the delay in calling an investigation into the sexual violence committed by Hamas on 7 October 2023.

A corresponding protest event took place at the UN on 4 December 2023.

== See also ==
- UN Women Goodwill Ambassador
- United Nations:
  - Special measures for gender equality in the United Nations (UN)
  - Convention on the Elimination of All Forms of Discrimination Against Women (CEDAW)
  - Declaration on the Elimination of Discrimination against Women
  - Declaration on the Elimination of Violence Against Women
  - EGM: prevention of violence against women and girls
  - Global Implementation Plan to End Violence against Women and Girls
  - HeForShe
  - NGO Committee on the Status of Women, New York (NGO CSW/NY)
  - United Nations Development Fund for Women (UNIFEM)
  - United Nations Security Council Resolution 1325 (UNSRC 1325)
- Convention on preventing and combating violence against women and domestic violence (Istanbul Convention)
- Gender Equality Architecture Reform (GEAR)
