= Paula Ávila-Guillén =

Colombian lawyer and activist

Paula Avila-Guillen
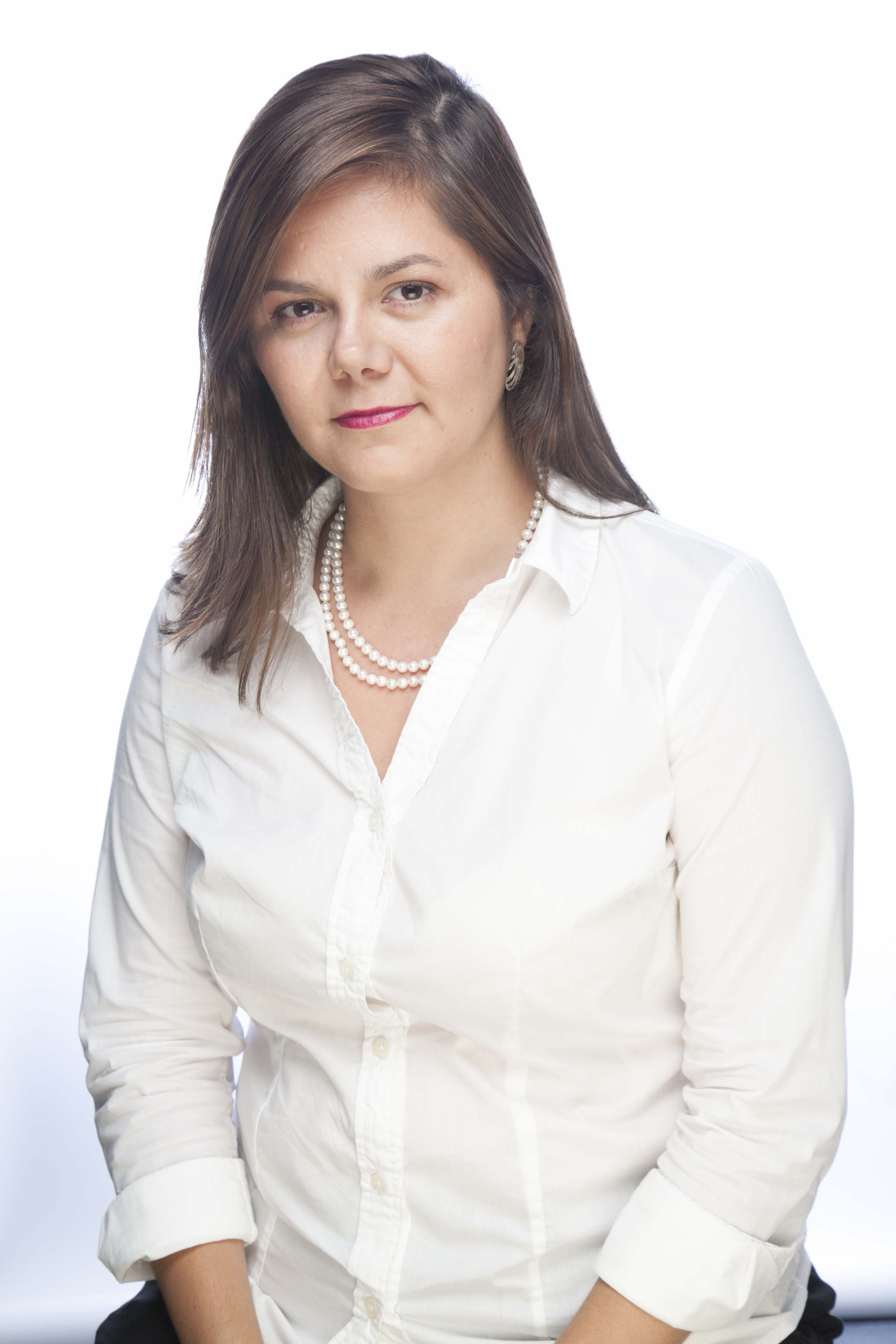
- Born: Bogotá, Colombia
- Education: Universidad of Los Andes | American University
- Occupations: Lawyer and Women's Rights Activist

Paula Avila-Guillen is a Colombian-American lawyer, specialist in human rights, and sexual and reproductive rights activist in Latin America. She is currently the Executive Director of the Women's Equality Center. At La-WEC, she collaborates with Latin-American organizations and leaders working for reproductive freedom in the region, designing strategies such as legal defense tactics and communications campaigns.

== Biography ==
Paula was born in Bogotá, Colombia. She graduated as a Lawyer from the University of Los Andes and obtained a Master's Degree in Law with an emphasis on Human Rights at American University Washington College of Law. In 2012, she was admitted to the New York State Bar.

== Professional background ==
=== Women's Equality Center, WEC ===
As Executive Director of WEC, she leads strategies, campaigns and tactics in search of eliminate the total abortion ban that exist all over Latin-America; allow emergency contraception and support local advocacy for women's rights in this world's region.

=== Center for Reproductive Rights, CRR ===
Between 2014 and 2016, Avila-Guillen worked as Advocacy Advisor for Latin-America in the Center for Reproductive Rights. In this position, she created and implemented legal defense strategies in support of abortion rights in the region and identified opportunities to connect high level organizations (such as the United Nations and the Organization of American States) with sexual and reproductive rights issues.

At the Center for Reproductive Rights, she also directed the communications strategy to hold El Salvador's government accountable for the unfair decisions made about dozens of women condemned for aggravated homicide and being imprisoned after suffering a miscarriage or having other kinds of obstetric emergencies. Her work has contributed to freeing of more than 15 women and it still being applied by a coalition of organizations, including the Women's Equality Center.

=== World Bank ===
As Consultant of the World Bank, Avila-Guillen lead a specific work for the implications for the Human Rights with the Zika epidemic.

== Publications and public speeches ==
Paula Avila-Guillen has been published op-Eds and academic articles related to sexual and reproductive rights, health and public policies. She had also lectured in different institutions and universities such as Harvard University and Georgetown University.

As international spokeswoman about women's rights, she has been interviewed and quoted by different media such as The New York Times, The Washington Post, The Economist, Time Magazine, The Wall Street Journal, CNN, CNN en Español, NPR, Newsweek, NBC News, Al Jazeera, The Guardian, BBC World News, El País, The Huffington Post, The Miami Herald, BuzzFeed, and some others.
