= Convention on the Elimination of All Forms of Discrimination Against Women =

International bill of rights for women

CEDAW
Convention on the Elimination of all Forms of Discrimination Against Women
- Party through Signature and ratification Party through accession or succession Unrecognized state, abiding by treaty Only signed Non-signatory
- Signed: 18 December 1979
- Location: New York City
- Effective: 3 September 1981
- Condition: 20 ratifications
- Signatories: 99
- Parties: 189 (Complete List)
- Depositary: Secretary-General of the United Nations
- Languages: Arabic, Chinese, English, French, Russian and Spanish

Full text
- Convention on the Elimination of All Forms of Discrimination Against Women at Wikisource

The Convention on the Elimination of all Forms of Discrimination Against Women (CEDAW) is an international treaty adopted in 1979 by the United Nations General Assembly. Described as an international bill of rights for women, it was instituted on 3 September 1981 and has been ratified by 189 states. Over fifty countries that have ratified the convention have done so subject to certain declarations, reservations, and objections, including 38 countries who rejected the enforcement article 29, which addresses means of settlement for disputes concerning the interpretation or application of the convention. Australia's declaration noted the limitations on central government power resulting from its federal constitutional system. The United States and Palau have signed, but not ratified the treaty. The Holy See, Iran, Somalia, Sudan, and Tonga are not signatories to CEDAW.

The CEDAW Chairperson position is currently held by Nahla Haidar.

== The convention ==
=== Summary ===
The convention has a similar format to the Convention on the Elimination of All Forms of Racial Discrimination, "both with regard to the scope of its substantive obligations and its international monitoring mechanisms". The convention is structured in six parts with 30 articles total.

- Part I (Articles 1–6) focuses on non-discrimination, sex stereotypes, and sex trafficking.
- Part II (Articles 7–9) outlines women's rights in the public sphere with an emphasis on political life, representation, and rights to nationality.
- Part III (Articles 10–14) describes the economic and social rights of women, particularly focusing on education, employment, and health. Part III also includes special protections for rural women and the problems they face.
- Part IV (Article 15 and 16) outlines women's right to equality in marriage and family life along with the right to equality before the law.
- Part V (Articles 17–22) establishes the Committee on the Elimination of Discrimination against Women as well as the states parties' reporting procedure.
- Part VI (Articles 23–30) describes the effects of the convention on other treaties, the commitment of the states parties and the administration of the convention.

=== Core provisions ===
Article 1 defines discrimination against women in the following terms:

Any distinction, exclusion or restriction made on the basis of sex which has the effect or purpose of impairing or nullifying the recognition, enjoyment or exercise by women, irrespective of their marital status, on a basis of equality of men and women, of human rights and fundamental freedoms in the political, economic, social, cultural, civil or any other field.

Article 2 mandates that states parties ratifying the convention declare intent to enshrine gender equality into their domestic legislation, repeal all discriminatory provisions in their laws, and enact new provisions to guard against discrimination against women. States ratifying the convention must also establish tribunals and public institutions to guarantee women effective protection against discrimination, and take steps to eliminate all forms of discrimination practiced against women by individuals, organizations, and enterprises.

Article 3 requires states parties to guarantee basic human rights and fundamental freedoms to women "on a basis of equality with men" through the "political, social, economic, and cultural fields."

Article 4 notes that "[a]doption...of special measures aimed at accelerating de facto equality between men and women shall not be considered discrimination." It adds that special protection for maternity is not regarded as gender discrimination.

Article 5 requires states parties to take measures to seek to eliminate prejudices and customs based on the idea of the inferiority or the superiority of one sex or on stereotyped role for men and women. It also mandates the states parties "[t]o ensure...the recognition of the common responsibility of men and women in the upbringing and development of their children."

Article 6 obliges states parties to "take all appropriate measures, including legislation, to suppress all forms of trafficking in women and exploitation of prostitution of women."

Article 7 guarantees women equality in political and public life with a focus on equality in voting, participation in government, and participation in "non-governmental organizations and associations concerned with the public and political life of the country."

Article 8 provides that states parties will guarantee women's equal "opportunity to represent their Government at the international level and to participate in the work of international organizations."

Article 9 mandates state parties to "grant women equal rights with men to acquire, change or retain their nationality" and equal rights "with respect to the nationality of their children."

Article 10 mandates equal opportunity in education for female students and encourages coeducation. It also provides equal access to athletics, scholarships and grants as well as requires "reduction in female students' drop out rates."

Article 11 outlines the right to work for women as "an unalienable right of all human beings." It requires equal pay for equal work, the right to social security, paid leave and maternity leave "with pay or with comparable social benefits without loss of former employment, seniority or social allowances." Dismissal on the grounds of maternity, pregnancy or status of marriage shall be prohibited with sanction.

Article 12 creates the obligation of states parties to "take all appropriate measures to eliminate discrimination against women in the field of healthcare in order to ensure...access to health care services, including those related to family planning."

Article 13 guarantees equality to women "in economic and social life," especially with respect to "the right to family benefits, the right to bank loans, mortgages and other forms of financial credit, and the right to participate in recreational activities, sports and all aspects of cultural life."

Article 14 provides protections for rural women and their special problems, ensuring the right of women to participate in development programs, "to have access to adequate health care facilities," "to participate in all community activities," "to have access to agricultural credit" and "to enjoy adequate living conditions."

Article 15 obliges states parties to guarantee "women equality with men before the law," including "a legal capacity identical to that of men." It also accords "to men and women the same rights with regard to the law relating to the movement of persons and the freedom to choose their residence and domicile."

Article 16 prohibits "discrimination against women in all matters relating to marriage and family relations." In particular, it provides men and women with "the same right to enter into marriage, the same right freely to choose a spouse," "the same rights and responsibilities during marriage and at its dissolution," "the same rights and responsibilities as parents," "the same rights to decide freely and responsibly on the number and spacing of their children," "the same personal rights as husband and wife, including the right to choose a family name, a profession and an occupation" "the same rights for both spouses in respect of the ownership, acquisition, management, administration, enjoyment and disposition of property, whether free of charge or for a valuable consideration."

Articles 17 – 24 These articles describe the composition and procedures of the CEDAW Committee, like the hierarchical structure and rules and regulations of systematic procedure of the relationship between CEDAW and national and international legislation and the obligation of States to take all steps necessary to implement CEDAW in full form.

Articles 25 – 30 (Administration of CEDAW)

These articles describe the general administrative procedures concerning enforcement of CEDAW, ratification and entering reservations of concerned states.

== CEDAW with UNSCR 1325 and 1820 ==
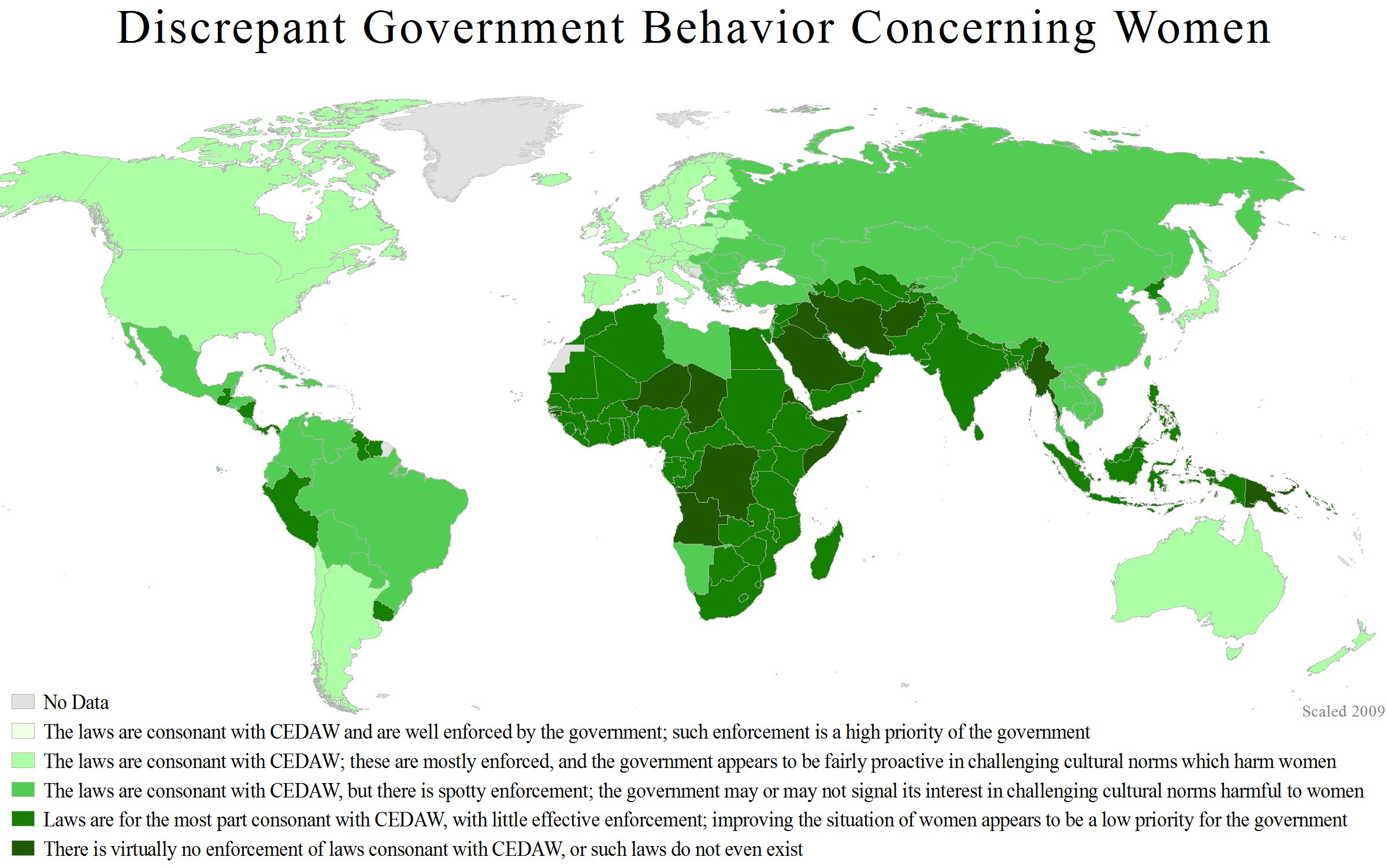
A world map showing countries by CEDAW enforcement, 2010

Resolutions 1325 10th anniversary events highlight use of CEDAW mechanisms

The 10th anniversary of Resolution 1325 in October 2010 highlighted the increasing demand for accountability to UN Security Council Resolution 1325 on Women, Peace and Security. Many expressed concern about the fact that only 22 Member States out of 192 have adopted national action plans. Women are still underrepresented, if not totally absent, in most official peace negotiations and sexual violence in peacetime and in conflict continue to increase.

These realities emphasized the need to use external legal mechanisms to strengthen the implementation of SCR 1325, particularly CEDAW. The well-established mechanisms of CEDAW – the Member States compliance report and the civil society shadow reporting process were cited as possible instruments to ensure accountability.

Several regional and international meetings including the High Level Seminar "1325 in 2020: Looking Forward...Looking Back", organized by the African Center for the Constructive Resolution of Disputes, and the "Stockholm International Conference 10 years with 1325 – What now?" called for the use of CEDAW to improve 1325 implementation.

Intersection between SCR 1325 and CEDAW

While CEDAW and UN Security Council Resolutions 1325 and 1820 on Women, Peace and Security are important international instruments on their own, there is also an intersection among the three standards that can be used to enhance their implementation and impact.

Resolutions 1325 and 1820 broaden the scope of CEDAW application by clarifying its relevance to all parties in conflict, whereas CEDAW provides concrete strategic guidance for actions to be taken on the broad commitments outlined in the two Resolutions.

CEDAW is a global human rights treaty that should be incorporated into national law as the highest standard for women's rights. It requires the UN Member States that have ratified it (185 to date) to set in place mechanisms to fully realize women's rights.

Resolution 1325 is an international law unanimously adopted by the Security Council that mandates the UN Member States to engage women in all aspects of peacebuilding including ensuring women's participation on all levels of decision–making on peace and security issues.

Resolution 1820 links sexual violence as a tactic of war with the maintenance of international peace and security. It also demands a comprehensive report from the UN Secretary-General on implementation and strategies for improving information flow to the Security Council; and the adoption of concrete protection and prevention measures to end sexual violence.

Resolutions 1325 and 1820, and CEDAW share the following agenda on women's human rights and gender equality:

1. Demand women's participation in decision-making at all levels
2. Rejection of violence against women as it impedes the advancement of women and maintains their subordinate status
3. Equality of women and men under the law; protection of women and girls through the rule of law
4. Demand security forces and systems to protect women and girls from gender-based violence
5. Recognition of the fact that distinct experiences and burdens of women and girls come from systemic discrimination
6. Ensure that women's experiences, needs and perspectives are incorporated into the political, legal and social decisions that determine the achievement of just and lasting peace

A General Comment from the CEDAW committee could strengthen women's advocacy for the full implementation of Resolutions 1325 and 1820 at the country and community levels. Conversely, CEDAW's relevance to conflict-affected areas will be underscored further by the two Resolutions. In other words, all three international instruments will reinforce each other and be much more effective if used together in leveraging women's human rights.

== Members and ratification ==
The six UN member states that have not ratified or acceded to the convention are Iran, Palau, Somalia, Sudan, Tonga, and the United States.

The one UN non-member state that had not acceded to the convention is the Holy See/Vatican City.

The Republic of China (Taiwan) in 2007 has also ratified the treaty in its legislature, but is unrecognized by the United Nations and is a party to the treaty only unofficially.

The latest state to have acceded the convention was South Sudan on 30 April 2015.

The United States made several unsuccessful attempts at ratification in 1988, 1990, 1994, 2000 and 2010. Within the United States, over 70 cities and local governments have adopted CEDAW ordinances or resolutions. The adoption of these measures has spawned a movement for local CEDAW implementation in the U.S.

== Reservations ==
Many reservations have been entered against certain articles of the convention. There are also some reservations that are not specific to an article within the convention but rather a general reservation to all aspects of the convention that would violate a stated principle. For example, Mauritania made a reservation stating it approved the convention "in each and every one of its parts which are not contrary to Islamic Sharia." A number of these reservations, especially those entered by Islamic states parties, are subject to much debate.

Article 28 of the convention states that "a reservation incompatible with the object and purpose of the present convention shall not be permitted." As a result, many states parties have entered objections to the reservations of other states parties. Specifically, many Nordic states parties were concerned that some of the reservations were "undermining the integrity of the text." Over the years, some states parties have withdrawn their reservations.

As of May 2015, sixty-two states parties have entered reservations against some part of the convention. Twenty-four states parties have entered objections to at least one of these reservations. The most reserved article is Article 29, concerning dispute resolution and interpretation of the convention, with thirty-nine reservations. Because reservations to Article 29 are expressly allowed by the convention itself, these reservations were not very controversial. Article 16, concerning the equality of women in marriage and family life is subject to twenty-three reservations. The committee, in General Recommendation No. 28, specifically stated that reservations to Article 2, concerning general non-discrimination, are impermissible. However, Article 2 has seventeen reservations.

== Committee on the Elimination of Discrimination Against Women ==
The Committee on the Elimination of Discrimination Against Women, usually abbreviated as "CEDAW Committee", is the United Nations (UN) treaty body that oversees the Convention on the Elimination of All Forms of Discrimination Against Women (CEDAW). The formation of this committee was outlined in Article 17 of the CEDAW, which also established the rules, purpose, and operating procedures of the committee. Throughout its years of operation the committee has held multiple sessions to ensure the rules outlined in the CEDAW are being followed. Over time the practices of the committee have evolved due to an increased focus on women's rights issues.

=== History of the committee ===
The Committee on the Elimination of Discrimination Against Women was formed on 3 September 1981 after the CEDAW received the 20 ratifications required for it to enter into force. Article 17 of the CEDAW established the committee in order to ensure that the provisions of the CEDAW were followed by the countries that had signed and agreed to be bound by it. The first regular session of the committee was held from 18 to 22 October 1982. In this session the first officers of the committee were elected by simple majority, with Ms. L. Ider of Mongolia becoming chairperson. Other officers elected were three vice-chairpersons: M. Caron of Canada, Z. Ilic of Yugoslavia and L. Mukayiranga of Rwanda. The final officer elected was D. P. Bernard of Guyana as rapporteur of the committee. During this session, the committee also unanimously approved to adopt its rules of procedure.

=== Sessions ===
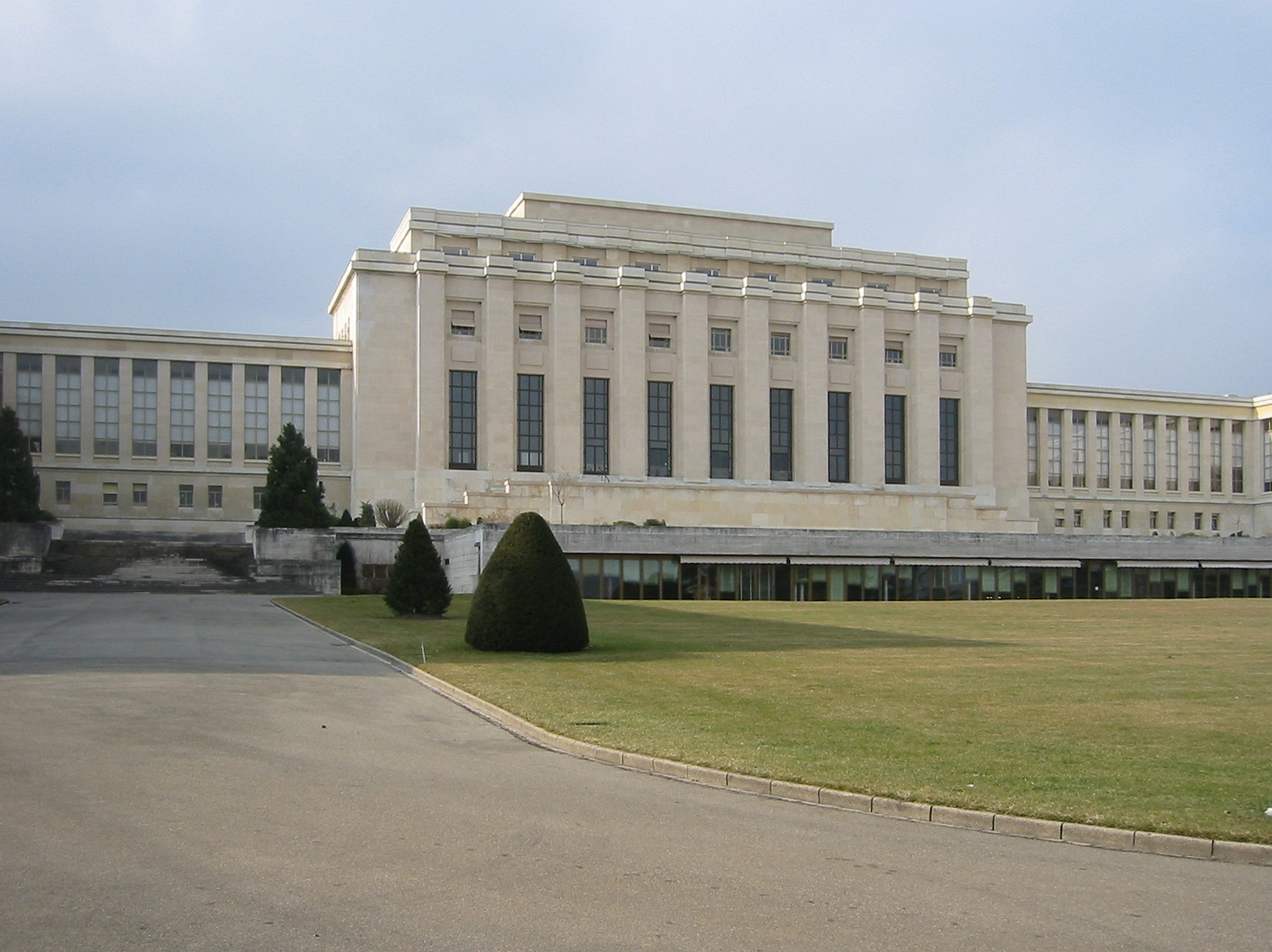
Palais des Nations

The rules regarding where and when the committee can hold sessions are laid out in their rules of procedure.

The committee is allowed to hold as many meetings as are required to perform their duties effectively, with the states party to the CEDAW and the Secretary-General of the United Nations authorizing the number of regular sessions held. In addition, special sessions can be held at the request of either a state party to the convention or the majority of the members serving on the committee. Seventy-two sessions have been held to date, with the most recent taking place from 18 February to 9 March 2019. The first thirty-nine sessions were held at the United Nations headquarters building in New York City, with the fortieth and subsequent sessions held at the Palais des Nations in Geneva. At its regular sessions, the Committee hears reports from states party to the CEDAW on their progress in adhering to CEDAW and implementing its ideas in their countries. The committee also holds pre-sessional work groups to discuss the issues and questions that the committee should deal with during the following session.

=== Reports ===
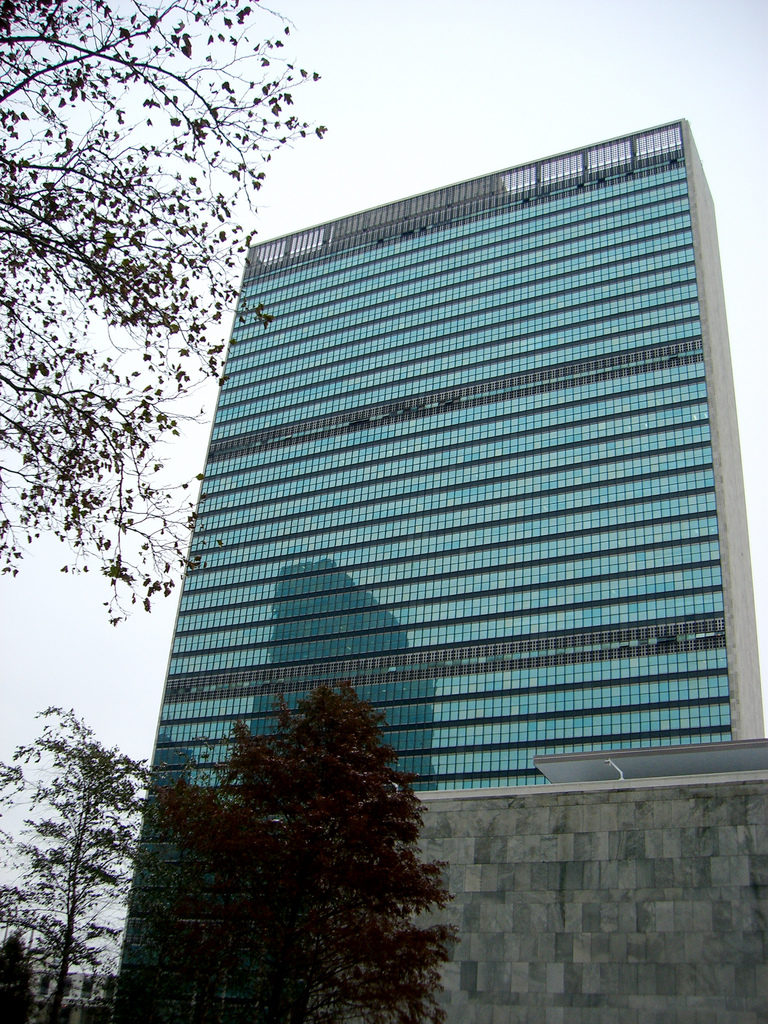
UN Headquarters

Under article 18 of the CEDAW states must report to the committee on the progress they have made in implementing the CEDAW within their state. As most of the information the committee works with comes from these reports, guidelines have been developed to help states prepare accurate and useful reports. Initial reports discussing the current picture of discrimination against women in the reporting states are required to specifically deal with each article of the CEDAW, and consist of no more than one-hundred pages. States are required to prepare and present these initial reports within one year of ratifying the CEDAW. Periodic reports detailing the state's progress in adhering to the articles of the CEDAW should be no more than seventy-five pages in length and should focus on the specific period of time since the state's last report. States party to the CEDAW are typically required to provide periodic reports every four years, but if the committee is concerned about the situation in that state they can request a report at any time.

The committee chooses which reports addressing by considering factors such as the amount of time the report has been pending, whether the report is initial or periodic (with more priority given to initial reports), and from which region the report originates. Eight states are invited to give their reports during each session and it is required a representative from the state is in attendance when the report is presented. The committee focuses on constructive dialogue when a report is presented and appreciates careful time management on the part of the state presenting its report. Due to the high backlog of overdue reports the committee has encouraged states to combine all of their outstanding reports into one document and sends reminders to states who have reports that are five years overdue. The CEDAW also requires that the committee provide an annual report that includes its activities, comments relating to the reports provided by states, information relating to the Optional Protocol of the CEDAW, and any other general suggestions or recommendations the committee has made. This report is given to the United Nations General Assembly through the Economic and Social Council. All reports, agendas and other official documents pertaining to the committee, including the reports provided by the states, are provided to the public unless otherwise decided by the committee.

=== General Recommendations ===
Along with issuing its annual report and offering advice to reporting states, the committee has the ability to issue general recommendations that elaborate on its views of the obligations imposed by CEDAW. To date, the committee has issued thirty-two general recommendations, the latest dealing with the gender related dimensions of refugee status, asylum, nationality and statelessness of women. The recommendations issued by the committee in its first decade were short and dealt mainly with the content of states' reports and reservations to the convention. Since 1991, however, recommendations have been focused on guiding states' application of the CEDAW in specific situations. The formulation of a general recommendation begins with dialogue between the committee on the topic in the recommendation with various non-governmental organizations and other UN bodies. The recommendation is then drafted by a member of the committee and discussed and revised in the next session, and finally adopted in the following session.

- General Recommendation No. 1 (1986) discusses "reporting guidelines."
- General Recommendation No. 2 (1987) discusses "reporting guidelines."
- General Recommendation No. 3 (1987) discusses "education and public information programs."
- General Recommendation No. 4 (1987) discusses "reservations."
- General Recommendation No. 5 (1988) discusses "temporary social measures."
- General Recommendation No. 6 (1988) discusses "effective national machinery and publicity."
- General Recommendation No. 7 (1988) discusses "resources."
- General Recommendation No. 8 (1988) discusses "Article 8."
- General Recommendation No. 9 (1989) discusses "statistical data."
- General Recommendation No. 10 (1989) discusses "the tenth anniversary of the adoption of CEDAW."
- General Recommendation No. 11 (1989) discusses "technical advisory services for reporting."
- General Recommendation No. 12 (1989) discusses "violence against women."
- General Recommendation No. 13 (1989) discusses "equal remuneration for work of equal value."
- General Recommendation No. 14 (1990) discusses "female circumcision."
- General Recommendation No. 15 (1990) discusses "women and AIDS."
- General Recommendation No. 16 (1991) discusses "unpaid women workers in rural and urban family enterprises."
- General Recommendation No. 17 (1991) discusses "measurement and qualification of the unremenerated domestic activities of women and their recognition in the GNP."
- General Recommendation No. 18 (1991) discusses "disabled women."
- General Recommendation No. 19 (1992) discusses "violence against women." Specifically, it states that "[t]he definition of discrimination includes gender-based violence, that is, violence that is directed against a woman because she is a woman or that affects women disproportionately."
- General Recommendation No. 20 (1992) discusses "reservations."
- General Recommendation No. 21 (1994) discusses "equality in marriage and family relations."
- General Recommendation No. 22 (1995) discusses "Article 20 of the Convention."
- General Recommendation No. 23 (1997) discusses "women in political and public life."
- General Recommendation No. 24 (1999) discusses "women and health."
- General Recommendation No. 25 (2004) discusses "temporary special measures."
- General Recommendation No. 26 (2008) discusses "women migrant workers."
- General Recommendation No. 27 (2010) discusses "older women and protection of their human rights."
- General Recommendation No. 28 (2010) discusses "the core obligations of states parties under Article 2." Here, the Committee states that reservations to Article 2 are incompatible with the object and purpose of the convention and therefore impermissible under Article 28. The Committee encouraged states parties to withdraw any reservations to Article 2 as soon as possible.
- General Recommendation No. 29 (2013) discusses "economic consequences of marriage, family relations and their dissolution."
- General Recommendation No. 30 (2013) discusses "women in conflict prevention, conflict and post-conflict situations." Here, the Committee said states parties are obliged to uphold women's rights before, during, and after conflict when they are directly involved in fighting, and/or are providing peacekeeping troops or donor assistance for conflict prevention, humanitarian aid or post-conflict reconstruction. The committee also stated that ratifying states should exercise due diligence in ensuring that non-state actors, such as armed groups and private security contractors, be held accountable for crimes against women.
- General Recommendation No. 31 (2014) is a joint recommendation with the Committee on the Rights of the Child discussing "harmful practices." For the first time, the Committee joined with the Committee on the Rights of the Child to release a comprehensive interpretation of the obligations of States to prevent and eliminate harmful practices done to women and girls.
- General Recommendation No. 32 (2014) discusses "gender-related dimensions of refugee status, asylum, nationality and statelessness of women."

Currently the committee is working on the General Recommendation Trafficking in women and girls in the context of global migration.

=== Changes in the committee ===
For the first ten years the committee operated significantly differently from now. The only form of censure given to the committee by the CEDAW was their general recommendations and concluding comments following a report. Due to the emergence of the Global Campaign for Women's Human Rights in 1991 more attention was given to the CEDAW, reviving the committee. The committee made changes to the CEDAW that allowed it to meet more than once a year, and have taken advantage of this by meeting at least twice a year since 1997. The committee originally only met for two weeks in its annual sessions, but that has now been changed to meeting multiple times a year in eighteen-day sessions. CEDAW also gained new complaint and inquiry proceedings allowing the committee to initiate inquiry proceedings if it believes a state is in severe violation of the articles of the CEDAW.

=== Recommendations for improvement ===
Despite evolving since the committee was first formed, members believe there are ways in which the committee can better meet the goals outlined in the CEDAW. One of the committee's main goals moving forward is expanding its information base, allowing it to more effectively deal with issues that arise concerning the CEDAW. The committee is authorized in Article 22 of the CEDAW to invite specialized UN agencies such as the United Nations Development Programme to deliver reports discussing women's rights issues in the state under discussion. Another method for gathering information is requesting reports from non-governmental organizations dealing with discrimination against women that are operating in the country under discussion. This is recommended to insure that the committee is receiving the full, unbiased picture of affairs within the reporting state.

Another recommendation for improvement involves interpreting and clarifying the language used in the CEDAW in order to make the document as useful as it can be. A third improvement that has been suggested is improving the efficiency of the committee. Due to the backlog in reports faced by the committee it has been suggested that the government officials who prepare reports presented to the committee should be trained, in order to make all reports uniform and more easily processed. A final suggestion for improvement is the implementation of a right of petition in the CEDAW, allowing the committee to hear complaints from citizens of a state against the state, increasing the committee's strength and direct impact on the problem of discrimination against women.

=== Languages ===
The official languages of the committee are English, Arabic, French, Russian, and Spanish, with any statement made in one of the official languages translated into the other four. A speaker who does not speak one of the official languages provides a translator. All formal decisions and documents issued by the committee are provided in each of the official languages. The original rules of procedure adopted by the committee did not include Arabic as an official language, but the rule was amended in the committees second session to include Arabic.

=== Members and Officers of the Committee ===
Twenty-three members serve on the committee, described as experts for their experience and expertise in women's issues. The members are nominated by their national governments and elected through a secret ballot by states party to the convention. Upon winning the election and taking up their responsibilities the members of the committee recite the following statement, known as the solemn declaration, "I solemnly declare that I shall perform my duties and exercise powers as a member of the Committee on the Elimination of Discrimination Against Women honourably, faithfully, impartially and conscientiously". The members come from a wide range of occupations including doctors, lawyers, diplomats and educators, providing various viewpoints to the committee due to their diversity. Many members continue to hold full-time jobs outside the committee and receive little monetary payment for their work on the committee.

To insure that the nationality of members encompasses all the diverse states who have signed the CEDAW, members are elected according to regions divided into Latin America and the Caribbean, Africa, Asia, Western Europe, and Eastern Europe. The members of the committee differ from those of other treaty bodies of the United Nations in that they have all been women with only one exception. In the event a member of the committee is unable to continue serving on the committee before their term is up, the state that had nominated the resigning member shall nominate another expert from their country to fill the seat. Committee members and experts also attend an annual luncheon, hosted by the NGO Committee on the Status of Women, NY (NGO CSW/NY), where key issues are discusses and the efforts of the committee are honored.

Officers of the Committee

The officers of the committee are composed of a chairperson, three vice-chairpersons and a rapporteur. Officers of the committee are nominated by another member of the committee, as opposed to a government which nominates members for the committee. All officers are elected by majority vote to a two-year term of office, and remain eligible for re-election after their term expires. The chairperson's duties include declaring a meeting to be open or closed, directing the discussion in a session, announcing decisions made by the committee, preparing agendas in consultation with the secretary-general, designating the members of pre-sessional working groups and representing the committee at United Nations meetings which the committee is invited to participate in. In the case the chairperson is unable to perform any her duties she designates one of the three vice-chairpersons to take over her role. If the chairperson fails to designate a vice-chairperson prior to her absence then the vice-chairperson with the first name in English alphabetical order takes over. In the event an officer is unable to continue serving on the committee before her term expires a new officer from the same region as the original officer shall be nominated, elected and will take over the vacated office. As of June 2019, the 23 members are:

CEDAW Committee Membership
Name	Nationality	Term Expires
Brenda Akia (Rapporteur)	Uganda	2026
Hiroko Akizuki	Japan	2026
Hamida Al-Shukairi	Oman	2028
Violet Eudine Barriteau	Barbados	2028
Rangita de Silva de Alwis	Sri Lanka	2026
Corinne Dettmeijer-Vermeulen (Vice-Chair)	Netherlands	2028
Nada Moustafa Fathi Draz	Egypt	2026
Esther Eghobamien-Mshelia	Nigeria	2026
Yamila González Ferrer	Cuba	2026
Daphna Hacker	Israel	2026
Nahla Haidar (Chair)	Lebanon	2028
Madina Jarbussynova	Kazakhstan	2028
Marianne Mikko (Vice-Chair)	Estonia	2026
Hong Mu	China	2028
Ana Peláez Narváez	Spain	2026
Jelena Pia-Comella	Andorra	2028
Bandana Rana	Nepal	2028
Rhoda Reddock (Vice-Chair)	Trinidad and Tobago	2026
Elgun Safarov	Azerbaijan	2026
Erika Schläppi	Switzerland	2028
Natasha Stott Despoja	Australia	2028
Genoveva Tisheva	Bulgaria	2026
Patsili Toldeo Vásquez	Chile	2028

== Optional Protocol ==
The Optional Protocol to the Convention on the Elimination of All Forms of Discrimination against Women is a side-agreement to the convention which allows its parties to recognise the competence of the Committee on the Elimination of Discrimination Against Women to consider complaints from individuals.

The Optional Protocol was adopted by the UN General Assembly on 6 October 1999 and entered into force on 22 December 2000. As of June 2024 it has 80 signatories and 115 parties.

== Controversy ==
Controversy around CEDAW comes from two opposite directions: social and religious conservatives which claim that CEDAW is seeking to impose a liberal, progressive, feminist standard on countries, in detriment of traditional values; and radical feminists, who are skeptical of the power, or even desire, of CEDAW to radically transform societies and truly liberate women, and claim that CEDAW adheres to a form of weak liberal feminism similar to other mainstream organizations. They also claim that UN members cannot create goals which represent values of the poor, conservative, religious, or weak, because few, if any, UN officials/staff are actually from this group for which they claim to represent.

In 2016, the candidate nominated from the Nordic countries, Gunnar Bergby, caused controversy, after the Norwegian government had used "radical gender quotas" to nominate him over a 'more qualified' woman, CEDAW expert Anne Hellum whose candidacy had been supported by all the large women's rights NGOs and the research environments in women's law in the Nordic countries as well as the outgoing Nordic committee member Niklas Bruun; as a result, Bergby's nomination was 'widely condemned' by women's rights NGOs and experts in all the Nordic countries. Bergby was the third man in a row from the Nordic countries nominated to the committee while no women had been nominated from the Nordic countries since the 1990s; the Norwegian Foreign Ministry told the women's rights NGOs that they refused to nominate a woman as a matter of principle because they wanted a man for the third time due to a need for "men's voices". Law professor at the University of Oslo Cecilia Bailliet stated that the women's rights NGOs in the Nordic countries were "shocked" over the nomination of Bergby over a "more qualified" woman and that Norway had "violated its commitments to gender equality as well as Norwegian law".

In 2019, Andorran human rights activist Vanessa Mendoza Cortés presented a case to CEDAW for the decriminalisation of abortion in Andorra and was subsequently taken to court for defamation by the government of Andorra.

In 2024, Reem Alsalem, was asked to provide input to a legal case in the form of a position paper to the Australian Human Rights Commission. Alsalem's paper discussed the definition of "woman" in international human rights treaties, particularly CEDAW. Alsalem argues that while CEDAW does not explicitly define "woman", it refers to biological females and that sex and sex-based discrimination in that context is understood as a biological category. The outcome of the case is viewed as one of great significance to advocates of female-only services and spaces in Australia, and for all countries around the world where CEDAW has been ratified.

In 2024, the committee issued a corrective recommendation regarding the exclusion of women from the line of succession in Japan’s imperial system This system, with a documented history of over 1,500 years, occasionally allowed women from the imperial family to ascend the throne. However, if these women married men outside the imperial family, their sons—who would carry a non-imperial Y chromosome—were not eligible for succession. Under the Imperial Household Law, enacted in 1889, female members of Imperial family were officially excluded from the succession line.

Although the authority of the emperor as the highest priest of Shinto was revoked by the United Nations (the Allied Powers) following Japan’s defeat in World War II in 1945, this new recommendation was perceived by the Japanese public as further infringement on religious dogma and interference in domestic affairs by the UN, causing widespread shock. Japan’s Ministry of Foreign Affairs swiftly lodged a strong protest with the committee, demanding the UN recommendation be retracted. In January 2025, following the committee's refusal to retract, the Government of Japan notified that the voluntary contribution to Office of the United Nations High Commissioner for Human Rights would not be allocated to the committee. The recommendation was prompted by reports to the UN from groups such as the Japan Federation of Bar Associations, known for its leftist and anti-imperial stances. This move is seen as part of political maneuvering by certain political factions within Japan such as Japanese Communist Party.

== See also ==
- Special Measures for Gender Equality in the United Nations
- Equal Rights Amendment
- Gender role
- Declaration on the Elimination of Discrimination against Women
- Declaration on the Elimination of Violence Against Women
- EGM: prevention of violence against women and girls
- Global Implementation Plan to End Violence against Women and Girls
- Convention on preventing and combating violence against women and domestic violence
- Convention on the Political Rights of Women
- Maternity Protection Convention, 2000
- United Nations Development Fund for Women
- United Nations Security Council Resolution 1325
- UN Women
- Women's rights
- Equality Now
- Alyne Pimentel vs. Brazil
