= Gunnar Bergby =

Norwegian civil servant

- Born: August 28, 1947 (age 78)

Gunnar Bergby (born 28 August 1947) is a Norwegian retired former civil servant. He was secretary-general of the Supreme Court of Norway; this is not a judicial office and not the head of the supreme court, but the head of human resources and support services. He served one term on the UN Committee on the Elimination of Discrimination against Women; his nomination over a more qualified woman and after the Foreign Ministry had ruled out even considering a woman was controversial and was widely condemned by the women's rights movement and the legal community in the Nordic countries as discriminatory towards women in itself, and was described as an example of radical gender quotas which are banned in Norway.

== Career in the Norwegian civil service ==
He was born in Oslo, and graduated with the cand.jur. degree in 1974. In 1975, he worked as a research assistant at Aarhus University, after which he was hired as an administrative officer in the Norwegian Ministry of Transport and Communications. He worked in the Norwegian Gender Equality Council from 1977 to 1979 and for the Norwegian Gender Equality Ombud (Eva Kolstad) from 1979 to 1986. From 1986 to 1989 he was the town clerk (byskriver) of Oslo, and from 1989 to 1994 he served as stipendiary magistrate (byfogd).

In 1994 he became been the administrative director/secretary-general of the Supreme Court of Norway. In Norway this is neither a judicial office nor the head of the Supreme Court, but corresponds to the head of human resources, ranking below the chief justice and the 19 justices. He retired in 2019; originally it was announced that he would retire two years prior upon reaching the mandatory retirement age.

== Membership on the Committee on the Elimination of Discrimination against Women ==
In 2016 the Norwegian government nominated him as a member of the Committee on the Elimination of Discrimination against Women, a UN body of experts on discrimination against women, and he was subsequently elected to this committee. His nomination was controversial because all the women's rights organizations in the Nordic countries had nominated Anne Hellum, the Director of the Institute of Women's Law at the University of Oslo and whose candidacy was also supported by the outgoing Nordic committee member Niklas Bruun, and because Bergby was regarded as being far less qualified than Hellum, having no academic publications in this field despite this being one of the key criteria. The nomination was criticized by several jurists and other experts on gender equality in Norway, among them Hege Skjeie, Inga Bostad, Helga Hernes, Cecilia Bailliet, Ingunn Ikdahl, Vibeke Blaker Strand and Aslak Syse, as discriminatory towards women. Bergby was the third man in a row from the Nordic countries nominated to this committee, while no women from the Nordic countries had been nominated since the 1990s; the women's rights NGOs in Norway were told by the Norwegian Ministry of Foreign Affairs that they refused to nominate a woman as a matter of principle because they wanted a man for the third time due to a need for "men's voices". Law professor at the University of Oslo Cecilia Bailliet stated that the women's rights NGOs in the Nordic countries were "shocked" over the government's nomination of Bergby over a more qualified woman and the Foreign Ministry's use of "radical gender quotas" to promote men to a body concerned with discrimination of women, and that Norway had backtracked on its commitments to gender equality. Bergby did not stand for reelection in 2020; despite the calls to nominate a woman from the Nordic countries over the past 20 years, the foreign ministry abstained from nominating a candidate.
