= John Hendra =

Retired United Nations development leader

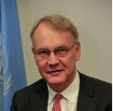
- Born: 1960/05/01 - 58
- Occupations: President, JD Hendra Strategic Consulting and former UN ASG and Senior Coordinator 'Fit for Purpose' 2030 Agenda for Sustainable Development

John Hendra recently established his own consulting practice after retiring from a dynamic 32 year United Nations career as a development leader in both Headquarters and the field. Hendra recently served as a member of the High-Level Group to review the governance of The Commonwealth and is currently serving on: the Advisory Council to Canada's Development Finance Institution (FinDev Canada); on the board of Women Deliver Canada; and as an Associate Researcher with the German Development Institute (GDI).

Most recently, he served as UN Assistant Secretary General (ASG) and Senior UN Coordinator helping the UN Development System (UNDS) become more "fit for purpose" to support implementation of the 2030 Agenda for Sustainable Development, including through the 2016 GA Resolution on the Quadrennial Comprehensive Policy Review (QCPR), the policy framework set out by Member States to guide the UNDS' support to the Sustainable Development Goals (SDGs). In this role, he served as the UN Development Group ASG Co-Chair of the QCPR Coordinating Team, working directly with the UN Deputy Secretary General, Amina Mohammed, on the development of reform proposals for the UNDS.

As such, he played a key role in the preparation of UN Secretary-General Anotonio Guterres’ two seminal reform reports on “Repositioning the UN Development System to Deliver on the 2030 Agenda” - Ensuring a Better Future for All (July 2017) and Our Promise for Dignity, Prosperity and Peace on a Healthy Planet (December, 2017). He also substantively supported the intergovernmental negotiations in the UN General Assembly on the repositioning of the UNDS which resulted in the landmark GA Resolution (72/279; May 2018) which has ushered in perhaps the most comprehensive reform of the UN Development System in decades. Over this period he also provided advisory support to the UNDG, to individual UN Agencies and to UN Resident Coordinators and UN country teams.

Prior to this position he served from 2011 to 2014 as UN assistant secretary-general and deputy executive director, policy and programme, at the United Nations Entity for Gender Equality and the Empowerment of Women (UN Women). He was appointed by the United Nations Secretary-General Ban Ki-Moon on 11 March 2011. Hendra has also been closely involved in the process of formulating the 2030 Agenda, including as a member of the Informal Senior Coordination Group (2012-2014) and as co-chair of the UN Development Group's MDG Task Force. He also recently served as Co-Chair of the UN Leadership Group.

== Career ==
Hendra has had a dynamic career in the UN Development System, playing a leading role in major UN change initiatives including pioneering the "Delivering as One" Initiative for UN system-wide coherence and country-level reform in Vietnam; helping establish UN Women, the UN's newest entity; and in the design and strategic direction of the UN's support for, and response to, both the Millennium Development Goals (MDGs) and the Sustainable Development Goals (SDGs).

As deputy executive director for policy and programme at UN Women, he oversaw the development of the first two Strategic Plans (2011-2013 and 2014-2017) and provided strategic guidance to the design and implementation of UN Women's overall programme and its new regional architecture. He also helped lead UN Women's global policy work and engaged in extensive public advocacy on women's rights, putting gender equality at the heart of the new sustainable development agenda, the impact of austerity policies on women and the imperative of addressing care work, among other areas.

Before joining UN Women, Hendra served the United Nations in many countries, including 13 years as UN resident coordinator and UNDP resident representative (most senior UN official in-country) in Latvia (1993-1997), in Tanzania (2002-2006) and in Vietnam (2006-2011). Hendra has extensive experience and demonstrated achievement in UN reform, having served as UN resident coordinator in two of the most complex development environments: in Tanzania, where he helped develop a more coherent international response to national priorities and the new aid environment; and in Vietnam, where he led perhaps the most ambitious and comprehensive UN reform effort ever at country level, the "Delivering as One" Initiative.

Selected as one of eight pilot countries (along with Tanzania among others), Vietnam's experience of implementing "Delivering as One" was independently evaluated to have made significant progress in enhancing the coherence, effectiveness and relevance of the UN's development support to Vietnam. This model for more effective UN development support is now being used by 55 countries around the world.

As UN resident coordinator in Vietnam, he also enhanced the UN's policy engagement with top national leadership, while also maximizing the UN's convening power, in part by articulating a clear UN policy and advocacy voice in key areas such as the challenge of climate change, ethnic minority issues, mitigating the social impact of the economic crisis, addressing inequality, fighting corruption, gender equality and ending violence against women and achieving the MDGs.

== Personal ==
Hendra was born in Calgary, Canada, in 1960 and is married to Robin Hendra. They have two children Julia and Alison. Hendra has an MA in development studies from the University of Toronto (1985) and an Honours BA from Queen's University (1982). He also served as a Yale World Fellow in 2009.

== Publications ==
Hendra recently co-wrote a chapter "Change in the UN Development System: Theory and Practice" for the Routledge Handbook on the UN and Development (2021) and has published over 20 articles and op-eds including most recently a GDI briefing paper on the UN's role in policy advice; a "theory of change" for making the UN development system fit to support the 2030 Agenda; opening up national budgets for more accountable SDG financing; women's rights and the 2030 Agenda; UN reform and "Delivering as One"; and the role of men and boys in achieving gender equality in such publications as Columbia University Journal of International Affairs, Dag Hammarskjold Foundation Development Dialogue Papers and the UN University's Centre for Policy Research Papers.

== Awards and recognition ==
Hendra was awarded the Three Star Order of Latvia in 1997 and Vietnam's Friendship Medal in 2011. He was also awarded six medals in May 2011 for his contributions over the preceding five-year period (2006-2011) to Vietnam's progress in gender equality and women's empowerment, social protection and poverty reduction, development planning and public investment, access to justice and legal reform, agriculture, rural development and disaster prevention and addressing climate change.
