= Alyne Pimentel v. Brazil =

Case examined by the Global Human Rights System

The Alyne Pimentel vs. Brazil case is the first instance of the Brazilian state being convicted in the Global Human Rights System involving a complaint about obstetric violence and maternal death.

== The case ==
Alyne da Silva Pimentel Teixeira was a 28-year-old Afro-descendant woman living in Belford Roxo, in the state of Rio de Janeiro. On November 11, 2002, Alyne, who was six months pregnant, sought assistance from the public health network due to nausea and severe abdominal pain. During her visit, she was given painkillers and sent home. However, over the next two days, her symptoms worsened, leading her to return to the health facility on November 13.

Upon examination, the death of the fetus was confirmed. Alyne Pimentel then underwent an ultrasound scan and was subsequently informed that she would have an induced labor to remove the deceased fetus. However, the normal delivery was unsuccessful. After a 14-hour wait, Alyne underwent surgery to remove the remnants of the placenta.

On November 15, 2002, Alyne's clinical condition had worsened, leading to the decision to transfer her to a hospital in another municipality. After an eight-hour wait for an ambulance, Alyne was transferred to the General Hospital of Nova Iguaçu, experiencing bleeding and showing signs of coma. At this second hospital, the young woman spent several hours in the corridor due to a lack of available beds in the emergency room. On November 16, she died due to a digestive hemorrhage resulting from the delivery of the deceased fetus. A civil lawsuit was filed in 2003, but it took approximately ten years to be judged at the first instance court.

== Representation before the CEDAW Committee ==
In 2007, facing the slow progress of justice, the case was brought before the Committee on the Elimination of Discrimination against Women (CEDAW), an entity associated with the UN, by the global organization Center for Reproductive Rights.

In response to the committee, the Brazilian state disputed that Alyne Pimentel's death was due to maternal complications, relying on the findings of the Rio de Janeiro Maternal Mortality Committee, which had investigated the case and identified a digestive hemorrhage as the actual cause of death. Regarding the delays in the judicial process, it argued that all appropriate measures were being taken and that a final decision on the matter was anticipated by July 2008. However, the first sentence was only pronounced in 2013.

== Decision of the CEDAW Committee ==
In 2011, the CEDAW Committee held the Brazilian state accountable for the death of Alyne Pimentel, due to the failure to provide appropriate services for her condition as a pregnant woman. The committee also found that the young woman faced multiple discrimination on the basis of her Afro-Brazilian identity and economic status, and that the country failed to offer effective judicial protection and adequate legal remedies. In light of this, the Committee recommended that the country compensate the family and take measures against obstetric violence, ensuring that sanctions are applied to health professionals who violate women's reproductive rights.
