= Alice Kandaleft Cosma =

Syrian diplomat and women's rights activist (c. 1895 – c. 1965)

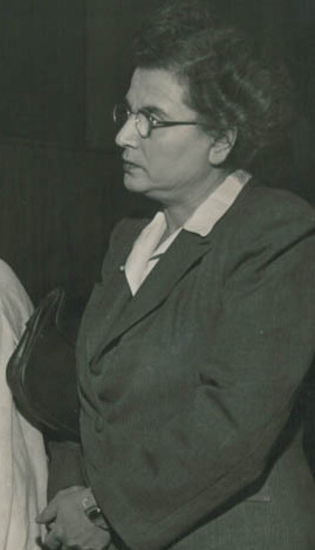
- Alice Kandaleft Cosma in 1948 at the United Nations
- Born: Alice Kandaleft c. 1895; Damascus, Syria
- Died: c. 1965; Beirut, Lebanon
- Occupations: diplomat, activist, teacher
- Known for: Activism on women's political and educational rights
- Notable work: "The World as It Is and as It Could Be"

Alice Kandaleft Cosma (Arabic: أليس قندلفت كوزما; c. 1895 – c. 1965) was a Syrian diplomat and women's rights activist. She is recognized for being a delegate to the first session of the United Nations Commission on the Status of Women in 1947. She was also the first Arab woman to represent Syria at the United Nations following Syria's independence in 1946. Her work in advocating for female political and educational rights in Syria led to some notable endeavors: founding a Damascus-based literary salon (1942), assisting in the creation of the Arab Women's National League (1945), and touring across educational institutes in the United States as an Arab educator who was vouched for by the Syrian government (1947).

== Early life ==
Alice Kandaleft Cosma was born as Alice Kandaleft in Damascus to a family from the Al-Qaymariya district. There is little known about her youth, other than how similar to other Arab and Syrian female activists, she passed through missionary education programs. She spoke English, French, and Arabic. She was of Christian faith. She used the name Alice Kandaleft Cosma in public-facing activities after her marriage, such as during her work at the United Nations, but used the name Alice Kandaleft while at home.

She completed her preparatory study at the Orthodox Patriarchate School, and continued her studies in Beirut at the Syrian Protestant College (today the American University of Beirut). She then moved to New York City where she earned a Masters of Arts in Educational Psychology and School Administration from the Teachers College, Columbia University around 1921 or 1922. Her master's degree at Columbia University was sponsored through a scholarship from the US government.

Kandaleft Cosma then returned to Syria with the goal of improving the quality of education for girls.

== Career and activism ==
=== Career beginnings and participation in Congress ===
Prior to her appointment as a representative to the United Nations Commission on the Status of Women, Kandaleft Cosma taught at various girls' schools in Iraq, Lebanon, and Syria through the 1920s and 1930s. Kandaleft Cosma's first teaching position was at the Baghdad Central College for Women. Her next position was at the Moslem Girls' College in Beirut as a principal. She also worked as a professor of education at the Teachers College in Damascus and as a principal at the State Normal School in Baghdad, the Private National School for Girls in Beirut, and the Secondary School of Arts and Crafts in Damascus.

In 1922, whilst in the United States, Kandaleft Cosma attended the International Congress of Women in Chicago, where she denounced imperialism in the form of the mandate system. Taking the role of the chair of the congress, Kandaleft Cosma helped in the preparation of the Arab Women's Congress for the Defense of Palestine in 1938. In 1939, Kandaleft Cosma joined the Ministry of Education in Syria. She was involved in the formation and oversight of women's organizations. With training and expertise in the sector of education, Kandaleft Cosma's focus within these women's organizations was to train teachers. Furthermore, Kandaleft Cosma participated in campaigns for women's suffrage.

=== Activism ===
In 1945, Kandaleft Cosma became the first president and co-founder of the Arab Women's National League. During this time, she is noted to have advocated for women's right to vote and to be elected for office to Arab leaders. In 1946, she became involved in the Anglo-American Committee of Inquiry on Palestine. Tasked with conducting socio-political examinations of Palestine following World War II, Kandelaft Cosma is noted to have been the only woman who testified before the Anglo-American Committee.

=== Speech tours in the United States ===
In 1947, one year following the independence of Syria, one of the first acts of the newly independent country was to send Kandaleft Cosma (an experienced activist and education advocate at the time) to the United States on a speaking tour in order to bring awareness to the status of Arab women. Kandaleft Cosma was granted a teacher's fellowship from the Institute for International Education (IIE) regarding the field of Arab affairs. This fellowship presented Kandaleft Cosma with the opportunity and means to give advocacy speeches around the United States. In May 1947, Kandeleft Cosma traveled across educational institutes in the United States to give her speeches. Her destinations included Meredith College in Raleigh, North Carolina and Kutztown State Teachers College in Kutztown, Pennsylvania.

Following the initial months of speech-touring across the United States, in August 1947, Kandeleft Cosma traveled to Southern Illinois University in Carbondale, Illinois to deliver another speech. A life-long advocate for women's rights in Syria, the content of her speeches included the subjects of political realities in the Arab world, Arab independence, and a final segment which was dedicated to answering questions which were posed by the audience about women's rights in the Middle East.

=== Involvement in the United Nations Commission on the Status of Women ===
In addition to the states she traveled to in order to deliver her speeches, Kandaleft Cosma also travelled to New York City in 1947, as the Syrian representative on the United Nations Commission on the Status of Women. Listed as a high ranking woman in the field of education within Baghdad, Kandaleft Cosma was nominated by the Syrian government to go to the United Nations in order to vouch for women's rights and protections in Syria, making her both the first Syrian representative in the CSW (Commission on the Status of Women) and the first Arab woman to represent Syria at the United Nations. As the Syrian government's first female representative to the United Nations, one of her responsibilities was to counter international stereotypes which surrounded the status of women in Syria and its neighboring states.

During the first meeting of the CSW, she expressed the name of the commission as being too simplistic. She further expressed her preference of using the original version of the wording (Commission on the Status on the Political Civil, and Economic Rights of Women) rather than its present name to no avail. In January 1948, Kandaleft Cosma became a rapporteur to the CSW. She was the second rapporteur for the CSW following Angela Jurdak Khoury. Kandeleft Cosma also participated in the organization of the third session of the CSW, held in 1948 in Beirut.

Kandaleft Cosma worked at the United Nations until 1952, after which she returned to Syria. In Syria, Kandaleft Cosma participated in campaigns for women's suffrage. Women in Syria were granted the right to vote in 1949.

== Legacy ==
In 1933, Kandaleft Cosma wrote an article that challenged imperialism and colonialism, which was a continuation of a speech she had delivered known as, "The World as It Is and as It Could Be", while representing Syria at the meetings of the International Congress of Women in Chicago during the same year. These reflections, "The World as It Is and as It Could Be – Continued", were included in a column by Rebecca Stiles Taylor (an American journalist who was writing for the Chicago Defender at the time). In January and February 1942, Taylor dedicated four columns to the perspectives of women from around the world. Kandaleft Cosma was the focus of the last column.

In 1942, Kandaleft Cosma co-founded, with Madani al-Khiyyammi, a political literary salon in Damascus in the Amiya Hotel. It was the first of its kind in Syria. Notable Syrian writers and politicians met here, including Salah al-Din al-Bitar, Omar Abu Risha, Michel Aflaq, Fakhri al-Baroudi, and Muhammad Sulayman al-Ahmad. The salon was a gathering place for Syrian intellectuals throughout the 1940s and 1950s to discuss and debate philosophy and the state of Syrian domestic politics. Kandaleft Cosma also participated in the first founding meeting of the Arab Socialist Ba'ath Party.

== Death and burial ==
Alice Kandaleft Cosma died in the mid-1960s in Beirut, Lebanon (exact date unknown), where she is now buried. Kandaleft Cosma is known for her part in advocating for the women's movement for education and right to vote in Syria.
