= List of parties to the Convention on the Elimination of All Forms of Discrimination Against Women =

Participation in the CEDAW: Signed and ratified Acceded or succeeded Unrecognized state, abiding by treaty / Only signed Non-signatory

The list of parties to the Convention on the Elimination of All Forms of Discrimination Against Women encompasses the states who have signed and ratified or acceded to the international agreement to prevent discrimination against women.

On December 18, 1979, the Convention on the Elimination of All Forms of Discrimination Against Women was opened for signature. Sweden became the first state to deposit the treaty on July 2, 1980. The treaty came into force and closed for signature on September 3, 1981 with the ratification of 20 states. Since then, states that did not sign the treaty can now only accede to it. The instrument of ratification, accession, or secession is deposited with the Secretary-General of the United Nations.

As of May 2015, 189 states have ratified or acceded to the treaty, most recently South Sudan on April 30, 2015. In addition, the United States and Palau have signed but not ratified the treaty. The Republic of China (Taiwan) has also ratified the treaty in its legislature, but is unrecognized by the United Nations and is a party to the treaty only unofficially.

== Ratified or acceded states ==
State	Signed	Deposited	Method
Afghanistan	Aug 14, 1980	Mar 5, 2003	Ratification
Albania		May 11, 1994	Accession
Algeria		May 22, 1996	Accession
Andorra		Jan 15, 1997	Accession
Angola		Sep 17, 1986	Accession
Antigua and Barbuda		Aug 1, 1989	Accession
Argentina	Jul 17, 1980	Jul 15, 1985	Ratification
Armenia		Sep 13, 1993	Accession
Australia	Jul 17, 1980	Jul 28, 1983	Ratification
Austria	Aug 17, 1983	Mar 31, 1982	Ratification
Azerbaijan		Jul 10, 1995	Accession
Bahamas		Oct 6, 1993	Accession
Bahrain		Jun 18, 2002	Accession, but did not ratify the optional protocol of preventing violence against women, and acceded with five reservations: to articles 2, 9, 15, and 16.
Bangladesh		Nov 6, 1984	Accession
Barbados	Jul 24, 1980	Oct 16, 1980	Ratification
Belarus	Jul 17, 1980	Feb 4, 1981	Ratification as Byelorussian SSR
Belgium	Jul 17, 1980	Jul 10, 1985	Ratification
Belize	Mar 7, 1990	May 16, 1990	Ratification
Benin	Nov 11, 1981	Mar 12, 1992	Ratification
Bhutan	Jul 17, 1980	Aug 31, 1981	Ratification
Bolivia	May 30, 1980	Jun 8, 1990	Ratification
Bosnia and Herzegovina		Sep 1, 1993	Secession from Yugoslavia
Botswana		Aug 13, 1996	Accession
Brazil	Mar 31, 1981	Feb 1, 1984	Ratification
Brunei		May 24, 2006	Accession
Bulgaria	Jul 17, 1980	Feb 8, 1982	Ratification
Burkina Faso		Oct 14, 1987	Accession
Burma		Jul 22, 1997	Accession
Burundi	Jul 17, 1980	Jan 8, 1992	Ratification
Cambodia	Oct 17, 1980	Oct 15, 1992	Ratification as (Cambodia) People's Republic of Kampuchea
Cameroon	Jun 6, 1983	Aug 23, 1994	Ratification
Canada	Jul 17, 1980	Dec 10, 1981	Ratification
Cape Verde		Dec 5, 1980	Accession
Central African Republic		Jun 21, 1991	Accession
Chad		Jun 9, 1995	Accession
Chile	Jul 17, 1980	Dec 7, 1989	Ratification
China	Jul 17, 1980	Nov 4, 1980	Ratification, extended to Hong Kong and Macau
Colombia	Jul 17, 1980	Jan 19, 1982	Ratification
Comoros		Oct 31, 1994	Accession
Congo	Jul 29, 1980	Jul 26, 1982	Ratification
Cook Islands		Aug 11, 2006	Accession
Costa Rica	Jul 17, 1980	Apr 4, 1986	Ratification
Ivory Coast	Jul 17, 1980	Dec 18, 1995	Ratification
Croatia		Sep 9, 1992	Secession from Yugoslavia
Cuba	Mar 6, 1980	Jul 17, 1980	Ratification
Cyprus		Jul 23, 1985	Accession
Czech Republic		Feb 22, 1993	Secession from Czechoslovakia; Signed July 17, 1980; Ratified February 16, 1982
DR Congo	Jul 17, 1980	Oct 17, 1986	Ratification as Zaire
Denmark	Jul 17, 1980	Apr 21, 1983	Ratification
Djibouti		Dec 2, 1998	Accession
Dominica	Sep 15, 1980	Sep 15, 1980	Ratification
Dominican Republic	Jul 17, 1980	Sep 2, 1982	Ratification
Ecuador	Jul 17, 1980	Nov 9, 1981	Ratification
Egypt	Jul 16, 1980	Sep 18, 1981	Ratification
El Salvador	Nov 14, 1980	Aug 19, 1981	Ratification
Equatorial Guinea		Oct 23, 1984	Accession
Eritrea		Sep 5, 1995	Accession
Estonia		Oct 21, 1991	Accession
Ethiopia	Jul 8, 1980	Sep 10, 1981	Ratification
Micronesia		Sep 1, 2004	Accession
Fiji		Aug 28, 1995	Accession
Finland	Jul 17, 1980	Sep 4, 1986	Ratification
France	Jul 17, 1980	Dec 14, 1983	Ratification
Gabon	Jul 17, 1980	Jan 21, 1983	Ratification
Gambia	Jul 29, 1980	Apr 16, 1993	Ratification
Georgia		Oct 26, 1994	Accession
Germany	Jul 17, 1980	Jul 10, 1985	Ratification as West Germany; Also East Germany; Signed June 25, 1980; Ratified July 9, 1980
Ghana	Jul 17, 1980	Jan 2, 1986	Ratification
Greece	Mar 2, 1982	Jun 7, 1983	Ratification
Grenada	Jul 17, 1980	Aug 30, 1990	Ratification
Guatemala	Jun 8, 1981	Aug 12, 1982	Ratification
Guinea	Jul 17, 1980	Aug 9, 1982	Ratification
Guinea-Bissau	Jul 17, 1980	Aug 23, 1985	Ratification
Guyana	Jul 17, 1980	Jul 17, 1980	Ratification
Haiti	Jul 17, 1980	Jul 20, 1981	Ratification
Honduras	Jun 11, 1980	Mar 3, 1983	Ratification
Hungary	Jun 6, 1980	Dec 22, 1980	Ratification
Iceland	Jul 24, 1980	Jun 18, 1985	Ratification
India	Jul 30, 1980	Jul 9, 1993	Ratification
Indonesia	Jul 29, 1980	Sep 13, 1984	Ratification
Iraq		Aug 13, 1986	Accession
Ireland		Dec 23, 1985	Accession
Israel	Jul 17, 1980	Oct 3, 1991	Ratification
Italy	Jul 17, 1980	Jun 10, 1985	Ratification
Jamaica	Jul 17, 1980	Oct 19, 1984	Ratification
Japan	Jul 17, 1980	Jun 25, 1985	Ratification
Jordan	Dec 3, 1980	Jul 1, 1992	Ratification
Kazakhstan		Aug 26, 1998	Accession
Kenya		Mar 9, 1984	Accession
Kiribati		Mar 17, 2004	Accession
Kuwait		Sep 2, 1994	Accession
Kyrgyzstan		Feb 10, 1997	Accession
Laos	Jul 17, 1980	Aug 14, 1981	Ratification
Latvia		Apr 14, 1992	Accession
Lebanon		Apr 16, 1997	Accession
Lesotho	Jul 17, 1980	Aug 22, 1995	Ratification
Liberia		Jul 17, 1984	Accession
Libya		May 16, 1989	Accession
Liechtenstein		Dec 22, 1995	Accession
Lithuania		Jan 18, 1994	Accession
Luxembourg	Jul 17, 1980	Feb 2, 1989	Ratification
Madagascar	Jul 17, 1980	Mar 17, 1989	Ratification
Malawi		Mar 12, 1987	Accession
Malaysia		Jul 5, 1995	Accession
Maldives		Jul 1, 1993	Accession
Mali	Feb 5, 1985	Sep 10, 1985	Ratification
Malta		Mar 8, 1991	Accession
Marshall Islands		Mar 2, 2006	Accession
Mauritania		May 10, 2001	Accession
Mauritius		Jul 9, 1984	Accession
Mexico	Jul 17, 1980	Mar 23, 1981	Ratification
Moldova		Jul 1, 1994	Accession
Monaco		Mar 18, 2005	Accession
Mongolia	Jul 17, 1980	Jul 20, 1981	Ratification
Montenegro		Oct 23, 2006	Secession from Serbia and Montenegro
Morocco		Jun 21, 1993	Accession
Mozambique		Apr 21, 1997	Accession
Namibia		Nov 23, 1992	Accession
Nauru		Jun 23, 2011	Accession
Nepal	Feb 5, 1991	Apr 22, 1991	Ratification
Netherlands	Jul 17, 1980	Jul 23, 1991	Ratification for the whole Kingdom
New Zealand	Jul 17, 1980	Jan 10, 1985	Ratification, includes Tokelau, Cook Islands and Niue (Note: Niue is a signatory of this convention, signed on behalf by New Zealand as was the Cook Islands, however since then the Cook Islands had acceded to the convention out right.)
Nicaragua	Jul 17, 1980	Oct 27, 1981	Ratification
Niger		Oct 8, 1999	Accession
Nigeria	Apr 23, 1984	Jun 13, 1985	Ratification
North Korea		Feb 27, 2001	Accession
Norway	Jul 17, 1980	May 21, 1981	Ratification
Oman		Feb 7, 2006	Accession
Pakistan		Mar 12, 1996	Accession
Palestine		Apr 2, 2014	Accession
Panama	Jun 26, 1980	Oct 29, 1981	Ratification
Papua New Guinea		Jan 12, 1995	Accession
Paraguay		Apr 6, 1987	Accession
Peru	Jul 23, 1981	Sep 13, 1982	Ratification
Philippines	Jul 15, 1980	Aug 5, 1981	Ratification
Poland	May 29, 1980	Jul 30, 1980	Ratification
Portugal	Apr 24, 1980	Jul 30, 1980	Ratification
Qatar		Apr 29, 2009	Accession
North Macedonia		Jan 18, 1994	Secession from Yugoslavia
Romania	Sep 4, 1980	Jan 7, 1982	Ratification
Russia	Jul 17, 1980	Jan 23, 1981	Ratification as Soviet Union
Rwanda	May 1, 1980	Mar 2, 1981	Ratification
Saint Kitts and Nevis		Apr 25, 1985	Accession
Saint Lucia		Oct 8, 1982	Accession
Saint Vincent and the Grenadines		Aug 4, 1981	Accession
Samoa		Sep 25, 1992	Accession
San Marino	Sep 26, 2003	Dec 10, 2003	Ratification
São Tomé and Príncipe	Oct 31, 1995	Jun 3, 2003	Ratification
Saudi Arabia	Sep 7, 2000	Sep 7, 2000	Ratification
Senegal	Jul 29, 1980	Feb 5, 1985	Ratification
Serbia		Mar 12, 2001	Secession from Yugoslavia; Signed July 17, 1980; Ratified February 26, 1982
Seychelles		May 5, 1992	Accession
Sierra Leone	Sep 21, 1988	Nov 11, 1988	Ratification
Singapore		Oct 5, 1995	Accession
Slovakia		May 28, 1993	Secession from Czechoslovakia; Signed July 17, 1980; Ratified February 16, 1982
Slovenia		Jul 6, 1992	Secession from Yugoslavia
Solomon Islands		May 6, 2002	Accession
South Africa	Jan 29, 1993	Dec 15, 1995	Ratification
South Korea	May 25, 1983	Dec 27, 1984	Ratification
South Sudan		Apr 30, 2015	Accession
Spain	Jul 17, 1980	Jan 5, 1984	Ratification
Sri Lanka	Jul 17, 1980	Oct 5, 1981	Ratification
Suriname		Mar 1, 1993	Accession
Swaziland		Mar 26, 2004	Accession
Sweden	Mar 7, 1980	Jul 2, 1980	Ratification
Switzerland	Jan 23, 1987	Mar 27, 1997	Ratification
Syria		Mar 28, 2003	Accession
Tajikistan		Oct 26, 1993	Accession
Tanzania	Jul 17, 1980	Aug 20, 1985	Ratification
Thailand		Aug 9, 1985	Accession
Timor-Leste		Apr 16, 2003	Accession
Togo		Sep 26, 1983	Accession
Trinidad and Tobago	Jun 27, 1985	Jan 12, 1990	Ratification
Tunisia	Jul 24, 1980	Sep 20, 1985	Ratification
Turkey		Dec 20, 1985	Accession
Turkmenistan		May 1, 1997	Accession
Tuvalu		Oct 6, 1999	Accession
Uganda	Jul 30, 1980	Jul 22, 1985	Ratification
Ukraine	Jul 17, 1980	Mar 12, 1981	Ratification as Ukrainian SSR
United Arab Emirates		Oct 6, 2004	Accession
United Kingdom	Jul 22, 1981	Apr 7, 1986	Ratification; extended to Bermuda, British Virgin Islands, Falkland Islands, Isle of Man, South Georgia and the South Sandwich Islands and Turks and Caicos Islands
Uruguay	Mar 30, 1981	Oct 9, 1981	Ratification
Uzbekistan		Jul 19, 1995	Accession
Vanuatu		Sep 8, 1995	Accession
Venezuela	Jul 17, 1980	May 2, 1983	Ratification
Vietnam	Jul 29, 1980	Feb 17, 1982	Ratification
Yemen		May 30, 1984	Accession as South Yemen
Zambia	Jul 17, 1980	Jun 21, 1985	Ratification
Zimbabwe		May 13, 1991	Accession

== Unrecognized states that abide by the treaty ==
State	Date	Method
Taiwan	2007	Accession

== States that have signed but not ratified the treaty ==
State	Signed
Palau	Sep 20, 2011
United States	Jul 17, 1980

== Non-signatory states ==
State	
Holy See	
Iran	Ratified by the parliament in 2003 and then vetoed by the Guardian Council.
Somalia	
Sudan	
Tonga	
