= Sarah Weiss Maudi =

Sarah Weiss Maudi (born 1975), also known as Sarah Weiss Ma'udi, is an international lawyer, diplomat, educator, and advocate. She was the Legal Advisor of Israel's Permanent Mission to the United Nations. Weiss Maudi founded the Israel MFA Women in Diplomacy Network in 2012 and is on its board.

Weiss Maudi is a graduate of the Ida Crown Jewish Academy, University of Pennsylvania(B.A. in Political Science and Arabic and Islamic Studies, summa cum laude), Harvard(M.A. in Regional Studies of the Middle East), and New York University School of Law (J.D.). She is a member of both the New York State Bar Association and the Israel Bar Association.

== Career ==
=== Early legal Career ===
Following her clerkship, Weiss Maudi was an associate lawyer for the Tel Aviv-based corporate firm, GKH, with a specialty specializing in international contract law. She also taught public international law at the Ono Academic College in Israel. Weiss Maudi served as a comparative legal research clerk for the Hon. Justice Dorit Beinisch at the Supreme Court of Israel.

=== Ministry of Foreign Affairs ===
In 2007, Weiss Maudi joined the Israel Israel Ministry of Foreign Affairs. There she has served as the deputy director of the International Law Department (2012–13), and the director of the International Law Department (2013–2018). At the Foreign Ministry, Maudi was the expert on maritime and humanitarian law.

Weiss Maudi negotiated Israel's first maritime border in Mediterranean Sea with the Republic of Cyprus (2010; entry into force 2011), and subsequently served as chief negotiator for Israel in negotiations with Cyprus on transboundary energy reserves (2011–2018). Weiss Ma'udi also negotiated Israel's regional maritime disputes and related transboundary-energy matters with Lebanon, Egypt, Jordan and the Palestinian Authority. Weiss Maudi drafted and negotiated several technical agreements on bilateral water-related issues with Jordanian Government and Palestinian Authority, including the Red Sea-Dead Sea Phase I Regional Desalination Project with Hashemite Kingdom of Jordan (2015), and served on the Israeli negotiating team in US-sponsored proximity talks with Palestinian Authority on water issues.

=== United Nations ===
From 2018 to 2022 Weiss Maudi served as the Legal Adviser and Counterterrorism and Sanctions Expert to the Permanent Mission of Israel to the United Nations in New York. During her tenure as Israel's Legal Adviser at the U.N. she In October 2020, Maudi was appointed in 2020 as the UN Legal Committee's Vice Chair of the Sixth (Legal) Committee of the 75th General Assembly. She represented the Western Europe and Others Group (WEOG). She was the first Israeli to be appointed to that position in 20 years, and the first Israeli woman to fill that role.

For the 77th Session of the United Nations (Sept. 2022- Sept. 2023), Adv. Weiss Maudi was appointed by the General Assembly President, Amb. Csaba Kőrösi, as a Senior Adviser and Deputy Team Leader of the Legal, Budget and Reform Team in his Cabinet, the first Israeli ever to be selected for such a position.

== Academic Lectures ==
Weiss Maudi is a frequent speaker and has lectured on topics ranging from Israel-UN relations; the law of the sea; land and maritime border disputes; the Iran deal; and regional water and energy issues at several top universities and academic institutions including Institute of National Security Studies and New York University. Weiss Maudi is a member of the American Society of International Law and has spoken at meetings, including the 2011 proceedings following the flotilla incident. In 2019, she was the Chair of the Israeli delegation to the United Nations' Intergovernmental conference on the conservation and sustainable use of marine biological diversity of areas beyond national jurisdiction.

== Publications ==
Weiss Maudi was the lead author of Israel's written 2017 Universal Periodic Review comprehensive human rights report, presented before the U.N. Human Rights Council in Geneva. She also contributed to the Israeli governmental report on the 2014 Military Operation in Gaza.

Maudi has published various articles on international law including a chapter in International Maritime Borders on the Israel-Cyprus maritime agreement she negotiated on Israel's behalf, an article on legal aspects of the 2010 flotilla incident in the American Society of International Law; a chapter on international maritime law in Robbie Sabel and Yael Ronen's (eds) International Law Textbook (in Hebrew). She was the lead contributor on Israel's submission to the International Court of Justice on the Chagos Advisory Opinion proceedings.
