= Raising Voices =

Nonprofit organization in Uganda

Raising Voices is a nonprofit organization in Uganda focused on promotion of children and women's rights.

== History ==
Raising Voices was founded in 1999 and currently partners with over 60 organizations spread throughout the horn, East and southern Africa.

== Scope ==
Raising Voices works towards the prevention of violence against women and children. It tackles issues like sexual violence, physical violence and Neglect or Negiligent treatment.

It also addresses the root causes of violence such as traditional gender roles and imbalance of power between Men and Women.

Raising Voices focuses its efforts on sectors like women and gender equality social services, child protection, education, human rights and media research.

Raising Voices has developed the Good School Toolkit and the SASA! toolkit which are used in 30 countries around the world. These tool kits have approaches that help change social norms that perpetuate violence against women and girls.

== Location ==
Raising Voices is located in Kamwokya Kampala.
