= Hong Mu =

Chinese actress from Hong Kong and Taiwan (born 1914)

- Chinese: 穆虹
- Born: December 18, 1924 (age 100); Beijing, China
- Other names: Mu Hong, Muk Hung, Mu Hung
- Occupation: Actress
- Years active: 1955–1962

Hong Mu (Chinese: 穆虹; born December 18, 1924) is a Chinese former actress who primarily acted in Hong Kong and Taiwan during the 1950s and early 1960s. Mu is credited with over 15 films.

== Early life ==
On December 18, 1924, Mu was born in Beijing, China.

== Career ==
In 1955, Mu began acting in Taiwan. Mu appeared as a lead actress in By the Hillside, a 1955 film directed by Tsung Yu. In 1957, Mu began acting in Hong Kong. Mu is known for her lead role as Big sister Hilda Kong in Our Sister Hedy (1957) and Wedding Bells for Hedy (1959), both Hong Kong romance comedy films directed by Doe Ching. Mu appeared in Night of E-U-Tan, a 1958 Hong Kong film that was filmed on location in Taiwan. Mu appeared as a lead actress in Taiwanese films and a few Hong Kong films in the 1950s and early 1960s. Mu's last Hong Kong film was My Son, My Son, a 1961 drama film directed by Wang Win. Mu is credited with over 15 films.

== Filmography ==
=== Films ===
This is a partial list of films.

- 1955 By the Hillside
- 1957 Our Sister Hedy - Hilda Kong, Big sister
- 1958 Night of E-U-Tan
- 1959 Wedding Bells for Hedy - Hilda Kong, Big sister
- 1960 A Shadow Over the Chateau - Lan Huizhu
- 1961 My Son, My Son
- 1962 Good Neighbors - Chen Wang-Aierh
