= NGO Committee on the Status of Women, New York =

The NGO Committee on the Status of Women, New York (NGO/CSW/NY) is one of three women's committees of the Conference of NGOs in Consultative Relationship with the UN (CoNGO). Established in 1972, it provides an open forum for women's voices to be heard at the United Nations. The NGO/CSW/NY assists girls and women of all ages to advocate and organize for the implementation of global agreements, including the Nairobi Forward Looking Strategies, Beijing Platform for Action, UN Security Council Resolution 1325 (among others), the Millennium Development Goals and the Convention on the Elimination of All Forms of Discrimination against Women (CEDAW). The committee works in cooperation with the NGO Committees on the Status of Women in Geneva and Vienna.

== Official Mission ==
The purpose of the NGO Committee on the Status of Women at the United Nations Headquarters in New York is:

1. To provide a forum during CSW for the exchange of information and for substantive discussion on issues and policies related to women under UN consideration and other relevant women-related studies and programs;

2. To assist the international community in implementing the Nairobi Forward-looking Strategies and the Beijing Platform for Action and decisions reached at subsequent major United Nations conferences as they relate to the advancement of women;

3. To facilitate cooperation among its member organizations, in areas of mutual interest, in the exercise of the consultative function and in activities supportive of women-related United Nations objectives;

4. To continue to work with the United Nations and its Commission on the Status of Women, UN Women, and other appropriate bodies and agencies within the United Nations system.

5. To work to mainstream a gender perspective throughout the UN system.

== Executive committee ==
- C0-Chairs: Ivy Koek, Soka Gakkai International (SGI), Pamela Morgan, Zonta International
- Vice Chair: Rosa Lizarde, [Servicios Ecumenicos para la Reconciliacion y Reconstruccion]
- Treasurer: Rahel Beigel, Women's Refugee Commission
- Recording Secretary: Luisa Kislinger, United Nations Foundation
- Communications Secretary: Gillian D’Souza Nazareth, [Red Dot Foundation Global]
- Members at Large:; Rosemary Barberet, [International Sociological Association]; Sulekha Frank International Alliance of Women; Saphira Rameshfar, Bahá'í International Community
- Past Chair, Ex-officio: Houry Geudelekian, Unchained at Last

== Membership ==
Committee membership includes almost 200 national and international non-governmental organizations and individuals who promote the status of women internationally by working at local, national and international levels on the issues addressed by the United Nations. NGO/CSW/NY represents more than 80 member organizations that are concerned about the status of women and active at the UN headquarters in New York. Voting members are those individuals who represent organizations in Consultative Status with the UN through the Economic and Social Council (ECOSOC); there is one vote per organization. Individuals may be members without vote.

Members receive notices of monthly meetings, special publications and updates on activities of the UN, plus invitations to all special events, receptions and meetings sponsored by the NGO/CSW/NY. In addition, the NGO/CSW/NY brings NGO representatives together to issue joint statements, facilitates NGO participation at CSW meetings, conducts training and orientation for NGO representatives, and runs an international listserv that keeps women worldwide apprised of issues throughout the world.

== How It Works ==
At meetings of the Economic and Social Council, the United Nations General Assembly, the Commission on Population and Development, as well as the Commissions on Social and Sustainable Development, the NGO/CSW/NY facilitates interaction between multiple stakeholders, including women's NGOs, the UN, governments, and the private sector. In collaboration with sister committees in Geneva and Vienna, the NGO/CSW/NY organizes the NGO Consultation Day in preparation for the UN Commission on the Status of Women (CSW) meetings. It convenes morning briefings at the UN, thematic and regional caucuses, and NGO parallel events during the annual CSW meetings.

The NGO/CSW/NY also works in partnership with other CoNGO committees to inform the UN and UN Women on a wide range of issues including violence against women, women's health, migrant and refugee women, indigenous people's rights, and the environment.

== Events ==
The annual calendar of activities for the NGO/CSW/NY includes the NGO Consultation Day followed by ten days of NGO activities during the CSW; a Woman Ambassadors’ Luncheon at which awards are presented to new women ambassadors; a Roundtable briefing to prepare for the CSW (jointly sponsored with UN Women); and panel discussions for members concerning current issues at the UN via monthly meetings.
