= Center for Reproductive Rights =

American non-profit organization

- Formation: May 14, 1992; 34 years ago
- Type: Nonprofit organization
- Tax ID no.: 13-3669731
- Legal status: 501(c)(3)
- Purpose: The advancement of reproductive freedom as a fundamental human right.
- Headquarters: New York City
- Region served: Global
- President and Chief Executive Officer: Nancy Northup
- Chair: Amy Metzler Ritter
- Revenue: $34,071,507 (2018)
- Expenses: $28,873,813 (2018)
- Employees: 179 (2017)
- Volunteers: 19 (2017)
- Website: reproductiverights.org
- Formerly called: Center for Reproductive Law and Policy

The Center for Reproductive Rights (CRR) is an American legal advocacy organization, headquartered in New York City, that seeks to advance reproductive rights, such as abortion. The organization's stated mission is to "use the law to advance reproductive freedom as a fundamental human right that all governments are legally obligated to protect, respect, and fulfill." Founded by Janet Benshoof in 1992, its original name was the Center for Reproductive Law and Policy.

Nancy Northup has served as President and CEO of the organization since 2003.

CharityWatch rates the Center for Reproductive Rights "B+".

== History ==
In July 2011, the CRR filed suit against the state of North Dakota over a state law that would ban all medical abortions. In July 2013, the CRR, along with the Red River Women's Clinic, filed a lawsuit against the enactment of "heartbeat bills", and genetic and sex selection restrictions on abortions. In September 2013, a federal judge dismissed the genetic and sex selection parts of the lawsuit without prejudice.

In 2011 the CRR joined with the American Civil Liberties Union (ACLU) and Planned Parenthood to challenge a law passed which requires women to get an ultrasound four hours before an abortion. In addition, it requires the doctor to put the ultrasound image within the view of the woman and describe it. The plaintiffs have called it an "ideological message," and a violation of the First Amendment. And since the patient is not actually required to listen to what the doctor describes and can even choose to wear blinders and headphones, the plaintiffs went on to call it a "farce."

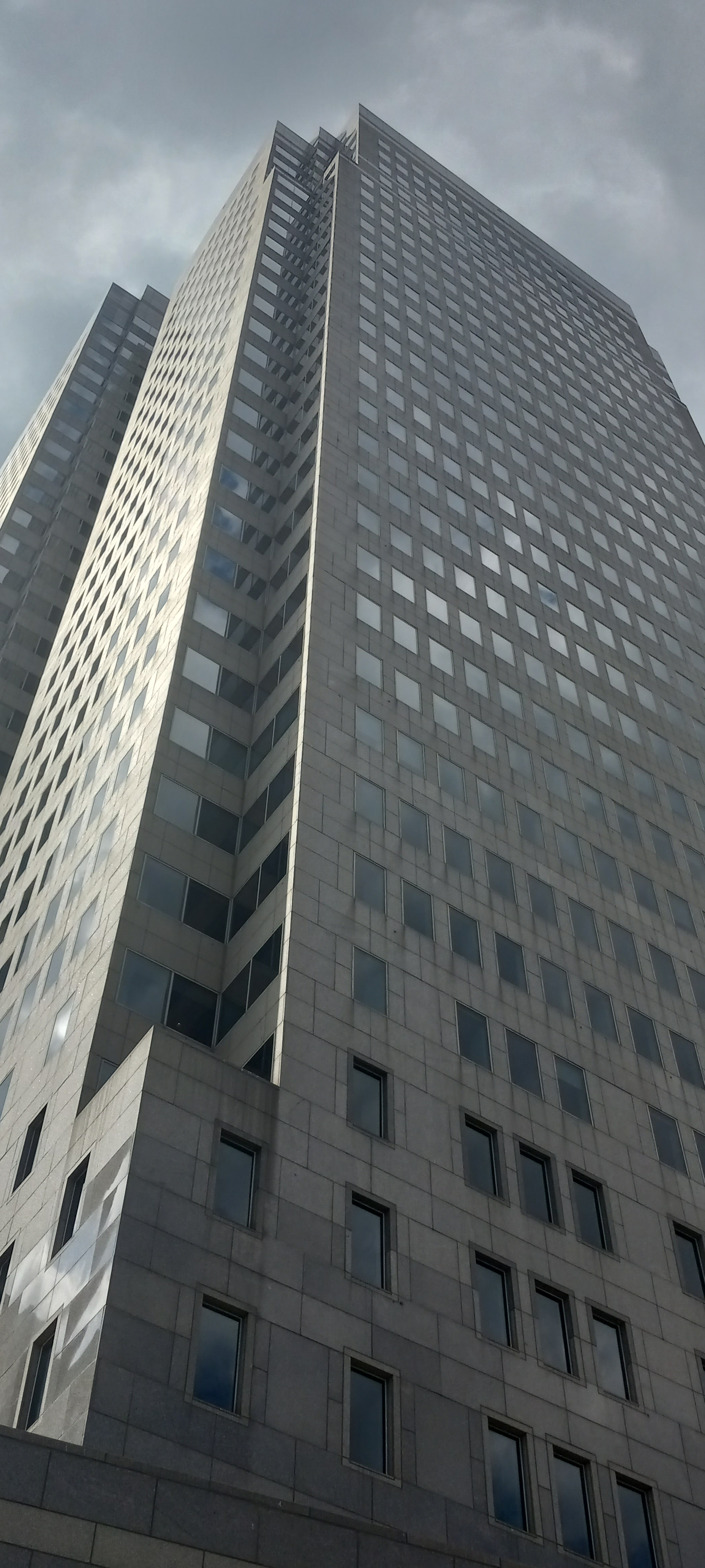
CRR is headquartered at One Seaport Plaza in New York City

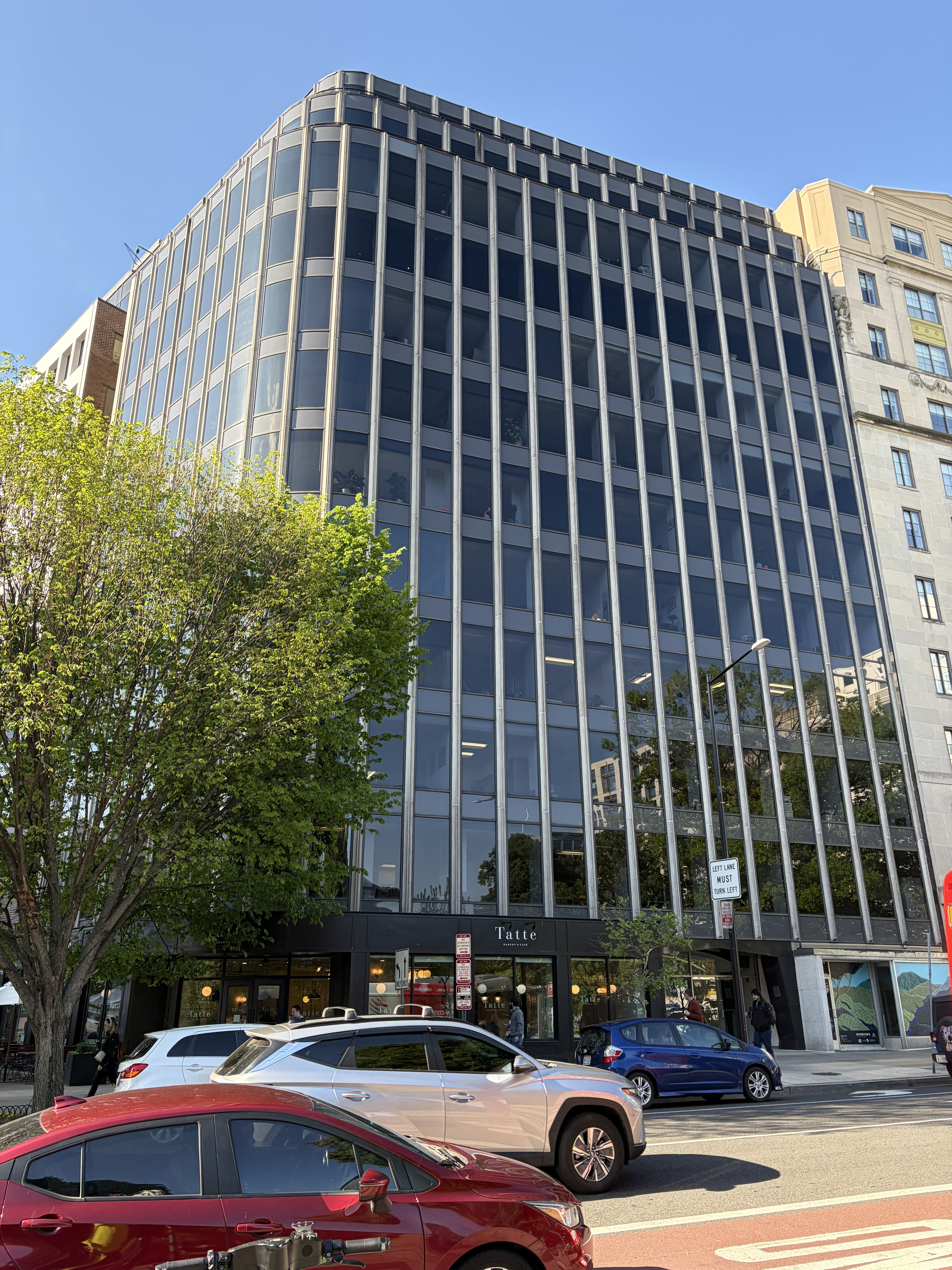
CRR's Washington, D.C., office location

After suing the Obama administration over the restricted access to birth control, in June 2013 the U.S. Department of Justice ordered that the Obama administration make all forms of emergency contraception available over the counter and without an age restriction.

In 2013, CRR was one of three primary groups challenging increased state level restrictions to reproductive health and abortion care. In May, the CRR and the ACLU jointly filed suit against a 12-week abortion ban in Arkansas. In June the CRR filed a lawsuit against the state of Kansas to block HB 2253 stating that the abortion restrictions it imposed are unconstitutional. In August a coalition of groups, including the CRR, filed suit in Oklahoma to block enforcement of a law that restricts access to emergency contraception, stating that the law is unconstitutional. In August a federal judge blocked the law from going into effect.

In November 2015, the United States Supreme Court agreed to review stringent restrictions enacted into law by abortion opponents in Texas. Upon coming into force the laws would leave Texas, a state with a population of 27 million, served by only ten clinics, 34 less than the number in service before the laws were enacted. The appeal, handled by the CRR, is U.S. Supreme Court docket number 16-274, Whole Woman's Health v. Cole. It is the first case that the high court has accepted scrutinizing abortion restriction since 2007.

In 2016 the CRR expanded its international program, including the launch of an international litigation campaign that has included the first abortion case decided by the United Nations Human Rights Committee and the first case to frame preventable maternal deaths as a human rights violation.

On March 2018, the CRR brought Dobbs v. Jackson Women’s Health Organization on behalf of the Jackson Women’s Health Organization (the last remaining abortion clinic in Mississippi) to overturn the Mississippi law that bans abortions after 15 weeks of pregnancy. The case reached the United States Supreme Court after it was upheld by the Fifth Circuit Court of Appeals that overturned the district court ruling that struck down the law. On June 24th 2022 the United States Supreme Court ruled in Dobbs v. Jackson Women’s Health Organization and overturned Roe v. Wade, removing the Federal constitutional right to abortion. This was the first time in history that a recognised fundamental right has been removed. The ruling meant that the Mississippi law went into effect and also paved the way for other states to create their own restrictions or bans.

The CRR has initiated litigation to challenge state abortion bans following the Dobbs decision. On March 6, 2023, the CRR filed Zurawski v. State of Texas, the first lawsuit on behalf of women denied abortions since the Supreme Court overturned the federal constitutional right to abortion. This case was filed on behalf of five Texas women denied abortion access due to serious pregnancy complications, and two Texas Obstetricians and Gynaecologists. The purpose of the lawsuit was to seek clarification regarding the extent of the medical emergency exception within the abortion bans.

== See also ==
- Center for Reproductive Law & Policy v. Bush
- Alyne Pimentel vs. Brazil
