= Anne Hellum =

Anne Hellum (born 1952) is a Norwegian jurist. She is Professor of Public Law at the Department of Public and International Law at the University of Oslo Faculty of Law. Her main areas of expertise are anti-discrimination and equality law, women's law, human rights and international development, sociology of law and African legal issues. Since 2000, she is also director of the Institute of Women's Law, which is part of the Department of Public and International Law.

She is also a visiting professor at the University of Zimbabwe, where she has taught since 1989 and where she was involved in establishing the Southern and Eastern African Center for Women's Law. She has been involved in research on the rights of women in Africa since the early 1980s and is an internationally recognised expert in the field, particularly on women's human rights and legal pluralism in Africa with a focus on reproduction, land and water.

She obtained her cand.jur. degree at the University of Oslo in 1981 and has worked at the Department of Public and International Law at the University of Oslo since 1987. In 1998 she obtained her Doctor of Laws degree at the University of Oslo, and she was promoted to full professor in 2000. She is a member of the advisory board of the Max Planck Society, and is editor of Kvinnerettslig skriftserie (Studies in Women's Law).

== Bibliography ==
- Anne Hellum and Henriette Sinding Aasen: Women's Human Rights: CEDAW in International, Regional and National Law, Cambridge University Press, 2015 (ISBN 9781107538221)
- Hellum, Anne; Derman, Bill (2008). "Observations on the Intersections of Human Rights and Local Practice: A Livelihood Perspective on Water By Derman, Bill; Hellum, Anne". Law, Social Justice and Global Development Journal, Annual. 11. The Electronic Law Journals Project. Archived from the original on 2020-01-04 – via Questia.
- Anne Hellum et al., Human rights, plural legalities and gendered realities: paths are made by walking. Weaver Press 2007 (ISBN 978-1-77922-062-2)
- Anne Hellum and Bill Derman: Neither Tragedy nor Enclosure: Are There Inherent Human Rights in Water Management in Zimbabwe's Communal Lands?. Frank Cass Publishers 2003 (ISBN 0-7146-5380-2)
- Anne Hellum and Kirsten Ketscher: Diskriminerings- og likestillingsrett. Universitetsforlaget 2008 (ISBN 9788215012629)
- Anne Hellum, Aslak Syse, Henriette Sinding: Menneske, natur og fødselsteknologi. Gyldendal Norsk Forlag Akademisk 1990 (ISBN 82-417-0082-2)
- Anne Hellum, Inger-Johanne Sand, Kristian Andenæs: Rettsliggjøring, kvinner, makt og politikk. University of Oslo, 2005 (ISBN 82-7100-143-4)
