= Declaration on the Elimination of Discrimination Against Women =

Human rights proclamation issued by the United Nations General Assembly

The Declaration on the Elimination of Discrimination against Women (abbreviated as DEDAW) is a human rights proclamation issued by the United Nations General Assembly, outlining that body's views on women's rights. It was adopted by the General Assembly on 7 November 1967. The Declaration was an important precursor to the legally binding 1979 Convention on the Elimination of All Forms of Discrimination Against Women (CEDAW). Its aim was to promote gender equality, specifically for protection of the rights of women. It was drafted by the Commission on the Status of Women in 1967. To implement the principles of the declaration, CEDAW was formed and enforced on 3 September 1981.

== Summary ==
The Declaration follows the structure of the Universal Declaration of Human Rights, with a preamble followed by eleven articles.

Article 1 declares that discrimination against women is "fundamentally unjust and constitutes an offence against human dignity". "Discrimination" is not defined.

Article 2 calls for the abolition of laws and customs which discriminate against women, for equality under the law to be recognised, and for states to ratify and implement existing UN human rights instruments against discrimination.

Article 3 calls for public education to eliminate prejudice against women.

Article 4 calls for women to enjoy full electoral rights, including the right to vote and the right to seek and hold public office.

Article 5 calls for women to have the same rights as men to change their nationality.

Article 6 calls for women to enjoy full equality in civil law, particularly around marriage and divorce, and calls for child marriages to be outlawed.

Article 7 calls for the elimination of gender discrimination in criminal punishment.

Article 8 calls on states to combat all forms of traffic in women and exploitation of prostitution of women.

Article 9 affirms an equal right to education regardless of gender.

Article 10 calls for equal rights in the workplace, including non-discrimination in employment, equal pay for equal work, and paid maternity leave.

Article 11 calls on states to implement the principles of the Declaration.

== See also ==
- Convention on the Elimination of All Forms of Discrimination Against Women (CEDAW)
- United Nations Commission on the Status of Women
- Women's rights
