= United Nations International Research and Training Institute for the Advancement of Women =

UN assembly subsidiary

- Abbreviation: INSTRAW
- Merged into: UN Women
- Parent organization: United Nations

The International Research and Training Institute for the Advancement of Women (INSTRAW Spanish: Instituto Internacional para el Avance y la Capacitación de las Mujeres) was a subsidiary of the United Nations General Assembly.

It was established upon recommendation of the World Conference on the International Women's Year 1975 in Mexico through the ECOSOC. INSTRAW started operations in 1979. Since 1983 its main offices were located in Santo Domingo, Dominican Republic, with a focus on the advancement of women through research and training. The institute was financed through contributions, which are mostly given by governmental organizations or private donors. In 2011, INSTRAW was merged into UN Women.

== About ==
INSTRAW worked to improve the economic and political lives of women around the world, improve their opportunities to communicate with one another, support sustainable and environmentally safe development and provide research and statistics on issues relating to gender. INSTRAW also held seminars and training in various languages in different countries.

INSTRAW developed a worldwide online network, the Gender Awareness Information and Networking System (GAINS), to provide information and training on gender equality. Information and resources were available through GAINS via a searchable database.

== History ==
INSTRAW was created following the First World Conference on Women in Mexico City in 1975. In Mexico City, participants decided that it was necessary to have research on issues relating to gender in order to make better policies regarding women throughout the world. It was also decided at the conference that INSTRAW would be based in a "developing country." It was created with a voluntary budget that relied on contributions, rather than being funded out of the United Nations budget.

On May 12, 1976, Resolution 1998 (LX) allowed the United Nations Economic and Social Council (ECOSOC) to create INSTRAW. ECOSOC created a plan to develop INSTRAW in phases and mandated that INSTRAW should be in place by 1977. INSTRAW began working on research and training in January 1980 and was accountable to the president of a board of directors, Delphine Tsanga. The first director of INSTRAW was Dunja Pastizzi-Ferencic, who started in 1981 and continued until 1990.

Several countries bid on hosting the headquarters for INSTRAW, and for a while, it was going to be located in Tehran. However, after the Islamic Republic was founded in Iran, the country withdrew the invitation in January 1979. Shortly after the withdrawal, it was suggested to locate headquarters in the Dominican Republic. The headquarters for INSTRAW had their grand opening in Santo Domingo in 1983.

In the early 1980s, INSTRAW emphasized research and training as their most important priority. By 1985, INSTRAW developed as its main mandate that their research was about "ensuring that constant attention is paid to the integration of women at all levels of development activity." INSTRAW also identified ways to provide training to women at different levels of opportunity.

In 1993, there was a proposed merger of INSTRAW and the United Nations Development Fund for Women (UNIFEM). Boutros Boutros-Ghali proposed the merger as a way to streamline the activities and improve efficiency in the organizations. Committees overseeing the proposed merger decided that both INSTRAW and UNIFEM would suffer and individuals at the Fourth World Conference on Women, 1995 supported the different mandates of each separate organization. Later, further evaluations of the organization also found that keeping INSTRAW independent was important, as it was the only part of the UN that was mandated to provide research and training for women. The Latin American and Caribbean Group (GRULAC) in 2003 requested a change be made to INSTRAW and the board of trustees was changed into an executive board with officials appointed by Member States. The new director in 2003 was Carmen Moreno. Going through these proposed and actual changes affected the work output of INSTRAW.

In 1999, ECOSOC and the board of trustees for INSTRAW were directed to create a new working method for the organization. This led to the creation of the Gender Awareness Information and Networking System (GAINS). GAINS allowed individuals to access information from INSTRAW through the internet.

INSTRAW began to work on the migration and development programme in 2005. In 2008, INSTRAW set up a database on information about women, peace and security.

In July 2010, the General Assembly created UN Women which would absorb INSTRAW's mandates.

== Directors ==
Directors of the organization are listed in the table below. There was no director during some years and the role was filled out by an acting official.

Nr	Director	From country	Term
9.	Yassine Fall	Senegal	July 2010 - March 2011
8.	Sergai Zelene V.	Russia	June - November 2009
7.	Kenneth Edwards	Guyana	May 2009
6.	Carmen Moreno	Mexico	2003-2008
5.	Eleni Stamiris (acting director)	Greece	2000-2002
4.	Yakin Ertürk	Turkey	1997-2000
3.	Martha Dueñas Loza	Ecuador	1994-1997
2.	Margaret Shields	New Zealand	1991-1993
1.	Dunja Pastizzi-Ferencic	(Socialist Federal Republic of Yugoslavia) Yugoslavia	1980-1991

== See also ==
- UN Women
