= Female economic activity =

Female economic activity is a common measure of gender equality in an economy. It is one of the numbers used by the UNDP in the calculation of the Human Development Index, but the numbers themselves are gathered by the International Labour Organization. It is a measure of women over the age of fifteen who are working or able to work as a percent of males. It is one of less accurate statistics gathered and is highly variable with regions and year to year within individual countries.

In general female economic activity is lowest in the Middle East and South Asia and highest in developed nations and sub-Saharan Africa. Even though, in Middle East and North Africa women at the age of 30 have more access to health and educational providers than their mothers, they still play a minor role in public, economic and political activities.

In the United States, women's involvement in the economy has shifted from the 1890s to the 1970s. Women used to work in what were called "pink collar" jobs, such as teachers, librarians, and secretaries, but now have careers involving investment like lawyers, doctors, and corporate workers. Compared to men who have always been at a constant high level of employment rates, women are now increasing their numbers in the economy. However, the growth rate is not equal for different regions, e.g. Middle East and North Africa, South and Southeast Asia still cannot compare with other regions and show the lowest rates.

Abbreviated as FEAR, it is a proportion of female population aged fifteen years and above who furnish or are available to furnish, the supply of labor for production of goods and services in accordance with System of National Accounts (SNA).
