= Gender Equality Duty in Scotland =

The Equality Act 2006 was complemented with specific duties later on. The general Equality Duty states that people should not be discriminated according to their age, race, gender, religion, disability and sexual orientation and required public bodies to take seriously threats of harassment or discrimination on the grounds of gender reassignment (i.e., anti-trans prejudice).

In 2007 the Gender Equality Duty was released demanding that public bodies promote equality of opportunity with a special focus on gender equality. Following this Duty requires acting by the rules posed by the Scottish Government. It is each public body's duty to publish a gender equality scheme which is to be revised every three years. There also has to be an annual report on what actions were taken to achieve objectives outlined in the equality scheme. Objectives might be about how the authorities plan to abolish discrimination and harassment as well as the pay gap between men and women. But also many other factors play into the Gender Equality Duty. According to Equal Opportunities Commission women and men should also use their right on equality in relation to parental leave after child birth or adoption. Another important factor is that the Gender Equality Duty does not just apply to bigger companies. It also applies to public bodies as schools and to education in general.

It was replaced by a general equality duty under the Equality Act 2010.

== Sex discrimination ==
According to Equality Commission there are four different kinds of sexual discrimination:

Direct discrimination:

When one is directly discriminated it means that it is obvious to everybody that one is treated less favourably because of one's sex.

Example:

- Dismissing a woman because she is pregnant.
- Dismissing a man because he wants to take paternity leave.

Harassment:

Harassment is a form of direct discrimination which aims at violating one's dignity by talking to people in an overly suggestive manner or by touching. This causes an intimidating, degrading, humiliating and even hostile environment at work.

Example:

- Unwelcome jokes, gestures or comments of a sexual nature
- Unwelcome displaying of sexually suggestive objects or pictures
- Unwelcome flirting
- Repeated and unwanted sexual advances
- Touching and other unwanted bodily contact, or impeding or blocking movements

Indirect discrimination:

Indirect discrimination occurs when the employer applies the same rules or criteria to men and women, but at the same time one sex is put at disadvantage as they cannot fulfill the requirements.

Example:

- Setting length of service as a criterion for a post where this is not relevant (women on average have less service than men in Lothian and Borders Police).
- Setting an unnecessary height restriction, as on average women are shorter than the average male.

Victimisation:

Victimisation is defined as treating a person less favourably because they have filed or want to file a complaint about having been harassed or discriminated against.

=== Equal pay ===
The Equal Pay Act 1970 demanded that men and women doing the same work get paid equally. With the Gender Equality Duty in 2007, it was stated that companies and public authorities have to publicly show how they want to improve the pay issue as a difference in payment shows gender discrimination. They are controlled regularly whether they achieved their objectives or not. Although the Equal Pay Act came into force almost several decades ago, there is still a pay gap of 15% between men and women doing the same work.

According to the Close the Gap Project, there are several reasons for differences in pay such as that many higher paying jobs are often seen as stereotypical male occupations with occupations often seen as stereotypically female tending to be lower paying. The majority of women (72%) are employed in public administration, education and health. Typical male jobs are handy work, mechanical work with the 89% of male employees working in the field of construction. It can also be seen that in high management position the percentage of men working there is higher than that of women working in similar positions. Another reason for the Pay Gap is the caring responsibility of women. As many workplaces lack flexible schedules women with caring responsibilities towards old or sick relatives, children or disabled people are more likely to look for part-time work which allows them to be more flexible. This can also be seen when having a closer look at the statistics. According to Esther Breitenbach and Fran Wasoff (A Gender Audit of Statistics: Comparing the Position of Women and Men in Scotland) about 55% of women work part-time as it is one of the work arrangements with flexible working hours, compared to only 22% of men who do use this work arrangement.

In Scotland women earn 12% less per hour than men when full-time salaries are compared. Women working part-time earn 32% less per hour than men working full-time.

== See also ==
- Legal aspects of transsexualism in the United Kingdom
- Gender equality
- Women's rights
