= Illustrators for Gender Equality =

Illustrators for Gender Equality (Dibujantes por la Igualdad de Género) is an international art exhibition conceived in 2007 with the aim of encouraging gender equality through opinion cartoons.

The exhibition comprises artworks of 30 graphic artists from 20 countries, and the cartoons do not include any words in order to reach out to all audiences, regardless of language.

Till present, Illustrators for Gender Equality has been shown in Spain, Mexico, Sweden, Cuba and Singapore; supported by organizations for the rights of women, cultural associations, governmental organizations and universities.

== Tour ==
=== 2007 ===
- Galileo Showroom, Madrid (Spain).
- Latinarte Showroom, Madrid (Spain).
- La Paloma Cultural Center, Madrid (Spain).
- Villa de Vallecas Youth Center, Madrid (Spain).

=== 2008 ===
- Royal Mail House, Madrid (Spain).
- Oaxaca City Palace Museum, Oaxaca (Mexico).

=== 2009 ===
- UNAM (Autonomous University of Mexico), Méjico F.D. (Mexico).
- Colima Regional Museum, Colima (Mexico).
- Francisco Velázquez, Havana (Cuba).
- Umeå University, Umeå (Sweden).
- Pintores Gallery, Cáceres (Spain).

=== 2010 ===
- La Musa Gallery, Baracoa (Cuba).

=== 2011 ===
- Palace of Justice of Xalapa, Veracruz (Mexico).

=== 2012 ===
- Palace of Justice of San Cristóbal de las Casas, Chiapas (Mexico).
- Palace of Justice of Yucatán, Yucatán (Mexico).

=== 2013 ===
- The Arts House, Singapore.
- Palace of Duke of Pastrana, Guadalajara (Spain).

== Artists ==
- Blasberg (Argentina)
- Tsocho Peev (Bulgaria)
- Menekse Cam (Turkey)
- Huang Kun, Yu Liang, Ni Rong (China)
- Elena Ospina, Vladdo (Colombia)
- Oki (Costa Rica)
- Falco, Ares, Adán (Cuba)
- Kilia (Dominican Republic)
- Pancho Cajas (Ecuador)
- Kimberly Gloria Choi (Hong Kong)
- Victor Ndula (Kenya)
- Boligan, Dario, Rocko (Mexico)
- Derkaoui (Morocco)
- Tayo Fatunla (Nigeria)
- Firuz Kutal (Norway)
- Florian-Doru Crihana (Romania)
- Omar Zevallos (Peru)
- Doris (Poland)
- Node, JRmora, Sex, Enio (Spain)
- Miel (Singapore)
- Enos (USA)

== Bibliography ==
- El País Newspaper
- https://www.infobuckle.com/2019/12/gender-parity-index-2020-which.html
- http://www.jrmora.com/blog/2009/10/16/dibujantes-por-la-igualdad-de-suecia-a-caceres/
- http://www.yucatannoticias.com/2012/06/muestra-itinerante-dibujantes-por-la-igualdad-de-generoen-los-juzgados-del-poder-judicial/
