= United Nations General Assembly Resolution 77/229 =

United Nations General Assembly Resolution A/RES/77/229

UN General Assembly Resolution 77/229
| In favour |
| Against |
| Abstained |
| Absent |
| Non-UN member |
- Date: 15 december 2022
- Meeting no.: 54th plenary
- Code: A/RES/77/229 (Document)
- Subject: Situation of human rights in the temporarily occupied Autonomous Republic of Crimea and the city of Sevastopol, Ukraine
- Voting summary: 82 voted for; 14 voted against; 80 abstained; 17 absent
- Result: resolution adopted

The United Nations General Assembly Resolution A/RES/77/229 titled "Situation of human rights in the temporarily occupied Autonomous Republic of Crimea and the city of Sevastopol, Ukraine" was a United Nations resolution issued on 15 December 2022 pertaining to the Russian invasion of Ukraine.

== Voting ==
| Vote | Tally | States | Percent of votes | Percent of members |
|---|---|---|---|---|
| In favour | 83 | Albania, Andorra, Argentina, Australia, Austria, Bahamas, Belgium, Bosnia and Herzegovina, Bhutan, Bulgaria, Canada, Cape Verde, Chad, Chile, Costa Rica, Croatia, Cyprus, Czech Republic, Denmark, Dominican Republic, Ecuador, Estonia, Finland, France, Georgia, Germany, Greece, Guatemala, Hungary, Iceland, Ireland, Israel, Italy, Japan, Kenya, Kiribati, Kuwait, Latvia, Liberia, Liechtenstein, Lithuania, Luxembourg, Malawi, Maldives, Malta, Marshall Islands, Mexico, Micronesia, Moldova, Monaco, Montenegro, Myanmar, (Note: the junta is unable to vote in the United Nations) Netherlands, New Zealand, Niger, North Macedonia, Norway, Palau, Panama, Papua New Guinea, Paraguay, Peru, Philippines, Poland, Portugal, Qatar, South Korea, Romania, Samoa, San Marino, Seychelles, Singapore, Slovakia, Slovenia, Solomon Islands, Somalia, Spain, Sweden, Switzerland, Togo, Turkey, Tuvalu, Ukraine, United Kingdom, United States, Uruguay, Vanuatu | 51.93% | 48.70% |
| Against | 14 | Belarus, China, Cuba, North Korea, Eritrea, Ethiopia, Iran, Kazakhstan, Mali, Nicaragua, Russian Federation, Sudan, Syria, Zimbabwe | 7.73% | 7.25% |
| Abstain | 80 | Algeria, Angola, Antigua and Barbuda, Armenia, Bahrain, Bangladesh, Barbados, Belize, Benin, Bolivia, Botswana, Brazil, Brunei, Burundi, Cambodia, Cameroon, Central African Republic, Colombia, Congo, Côte d'Ivoire, Djibouti, Egypt, El Salvador, Eswatini, Fiji, Gabon, Gambia, Grenada, Ghana, Guinea, Guinea-Bissau, Guyana, Haiti, Honduras, India, Indonesia, Iraq, Jamaica, Jordan, Kyrgyzstan, Laos, Lebanon, Lesotho, Libya, Madagascar, Malaysia, Mauritania, Mauritius, Mongolia, Mozambique, Namibia, Nepal, Nigeria, Oman, Pakistan, Rwanda, Saint Kitts and Nevis, Saint Lucia, Saint Vincent and the Grenadines, Saudi Arabia, Serbia, Sierra Leone, South Africa, Senegal, Sri Lanka, Suriname, Tajikistan, Thailand, Timor-Leste, Trinidad and Tobago, Tonga, Tanzania, Tunisia, Uganda, United Arab Emirates, Vietnam, Yemen, Zambia | 40.33% | 37.82% |
| Absent | 17 | Afghanistan, (Note: the Taliban is unable to vote in the United Nations) Azerbaijan, Burkina Faso, Comoros, Democratic Republic of the Congo, Dominica, Equatorial Guinea Morocco, Nauru, São Tomé and Príncipe, South Sudan, Turkmenistan, Uzbekistan, Venezuela (Note: Venezuela was suspended from voting in the 76th session and the 11th emergency special session owing to its failure to pay dues in the previous two years, for which it did not receive a special waiver from the Assembly.) | | |

== See also ==
- Eleventh emergency special session of the United Nations General Assembly
- Legality of the Russian invasion of Ukraine
- United Nations General Assembly Resolution 68/262
- United Nations General Assembly Resolution ES-11/1
- United Nations General Assembly Resolution ES-11/2
- United Nations General Assembly Resolution ES-11/3
- United Nations General Assembly Resolution ES-11/4
- United Nations General Assembly Resolution ES-11/5
- United Nations General Assembly Resolution ES-11/6
- United Nations General Assembly resolution
- United Nations Security Council Resolution 2623
