= United Nations General Assembly Resolution ES-11/9 =

UN General Assembly Resolution ES-11/9
- Date: 3 December 2025
- Meeting no.: 11th Emergency Special Session (continued)
- Code: A/RES/ES-11/9 (Document)
- Subject: Return of Ukrainian children
- Voting summary: 91 voted for; 12 voted against; 57 abstained; 33 present not voting
- Result: Adopted

United Nations General Assembly Resolution ES-11/9 titled "Return of Ukrainian children" is a resolution of the United Nations General Assembly about the Russian invasion of Ukraine. It was adopted on 3 December 2025, with 91 countries voting for, 12 against, 57 abstained, and 33 present not voting at the eleventh ESS. The session has been 'adjourned' and 'resumed' on numerous occasions over the past several years, and remains temporarily adjourned. Indeed, more than twenty separate 'plenary meetings' have been held by the Assembly, whilst sitting in the eleventh ESS, since 2022.

== Voting results ==
Vote	Tally	States
In favour	91	Albania, Andorra, Argentina, Australia, Austria, Bahamas, Barbados, Belgium, Belize, Benin, Bhutan, Bosnia and Herzegovina, Bulgaria, Cabo Verde, Canada, Chile, Comoros, Côte d’Ivoire, Croatia, Cyprus, Czechia, Denmark, Dominican Republic, Ecuador, Estonia, Fiji, Finland, France, Georgia, Germany, Greece, Guatemala, Guyana, Honduras, Hungary, Iceland, Ireland, Israel, Italy, Jamaica, Japan, Kiribati, Latvia, Lesotho, Liechtenstein, Lithuania, Luxembourg, Malawi, Malta, Marshall Islands, Mexico, Micronesia, Monaco, Montenegro, Myanmar, Nauru, Netherlands, New Zealand, North Macedonia, Norway, Palau, Panama, Papua New Guinea, Paraguay, Peru, Philippines, Poland, Portugal, Republic of Korea, Republic of Moldova, Romania, Saint Kitts and Nevis, San Marino, Seychelles, Singapore, Slovakia, Slovenia, Solomon Islands, South Africa, Spain, Suriname, Sweden, Switzerland, Timor-Leste, Tonga, Trinidad and Tobago, Ukraine,
Against	12	Belarus, Burkina Faso, Burundi, Cuba, North Korea, Eritrea, Iran, Mali, Nicaragua, Niger, Russia, Sudan
Abstain	57	Algeria, Angola, Armenia, Bahrain, Bangladesh, Botswana, Brazil, Brunei, Cambodia, Central African Republic, China, Colombia, Congo, Djibouti, Egypt, El Salvador, Ethiopia, Gambia, Haiti, India, Indonesia, Iraq, Jordan, Kazakhstan, Kenya, Kuwait, Kyrgyzstan, Lao, Lebanon, Libya, Malaysia, Maldives, Mauritania, Mauritius, Mongolia, Mozambique, Namibia, Nepal, Nigeria, Oman, Pakistan, Qatar, Saudi Arabia, Senegal, Sierra Leone, Sri Lanka, Tajikistan, Thailand, Togo, Tunisia, Uganda, United Arab Emirates, Tanzania, Uzbekistan, Viet Nam, Yemen, Zimbabwe
Present not voting	33	Afghanistan, Antigua and Barbuda, Azerbaijan, Bolivia, Cameroon, Chad, Costa Rica, Democratic Republic of the Congo, Dominica, Equatorial Guinea, Eswatini, Gabon, Ghana, Grenada, Guinea, Guinea-Bissau, Liberia, Madagascar, Morocco, Rwanda, Saint Lucia, Saint Vincent and the Grenadines, Samoa, Sao Tome and Principe, Serbia, Somalia, South Sudan, Syria, Turkmenistan, Tuvalu, Türkiye, Venezuela, Zambia

== See also ==
- Eleventh emergency special session of the United Nations General Assembly – 2022 ongoing session of the United Nations General Assembly
- Legality of the Russian invasion of Ukraine
- United Nations Security Council Resolution 2774 – 2025 non-procedural resolution on Russo-Ukrainian war
- United Nations Security Council Resolution 2623 – 2022 resolution for an emergency meeting on the Russian invasion of Ukraine
- United Nations General Assembly Resolution 68/262 – United Nations General Assembly resolution adopted in 2014
- Other United Nations General Assembly Resolutions with the prefix ES-11
