= United Nations General Assembly Resolution ES-11/4 =

2022 resolution rejecting the Russian annexation of 4 Ukrainian regions

UN General Assembly Resolution ES-11/4
In favour
Against
Abstained
Absent
Non-UN member
- Date: 12 October 2022
- Meeting no.: 11th Emergency Special Session (continued)
- Code: A/RES/ES-11/4 (Document)
- Subject: Territorial integrity of Ukraine: defending the principles of the Charter of the United Nations
- Voting summary: 143 voted for; 5 voted against; 35 abstained; 10 absent
- Result: Resolution adopted

United Nations General Assembly Resolution ES‑11/4 is the fourth resolution of the eleventh emergency special session of the United Nations General Assembly, adopted on 12 October 2022, following Resolution ES-11/3 which was adopted on 7 April 2022.

In resolution ES‑11/4, the General Assembly declares that the sham referendums held in the Donetsk, Kherson, Luhansk and Zaporizhzhia oblasts, which were conducted under disputed circumstances and unrecognised by the international community, as well as their subsequent annexation by Russia, are invalid and illegal under international law. It calls upon all states to not recognise these territories as part of Russia. Furthermore, it demands that Russia "immediately, completely and unconditionally withdraw" from Ukraine as it is violating its territorial integrity and sovereignty.

The resolution was passed with an overwhelming vote of 143 in favour, 5 against and 35 abstaining.

This resolution achieved more votes in favour of condemning Russia's actions than Resolution ES-11/1, the initial resolution on the Russian invasion of Ukraine which demanded that Russia withdraw its forces from Ukraine.

== Background ==
From 23 to 27 September 2022 Russia staged annexation referendums in the Donetsk, Kherson, Luhansk and Zaporizhzhia regions of Ukraine. The referendums are widely considered to be sham referendums.

Following these referendums, on 30 September 2022, Russian President Putin declared and decreed that these four regions would be annexed into Russia. At the time of the announcement, Russia only partly controlled some of the regions that were to be annexed.

On 30 September 2022, Russia used its veto power in the United Nations Security Council to block the resolution to declare the disputed referendums and subsequent annexation as illegal under international law. Under newly adopted procedures, the use of a veto in the Security Council triggers a meeting of the United Nations General Assembly. During the meeting of the General Assembly, the underlying draft resolution for ES-11/4, which is ES-11/L.5, was presented and adopted.

== Secret ballot proposal ==
Prior to the vote on the resolution, Russia called for the measure to be voted on by secret ballot, arguing that countries would have difficulties representing certain positions in public. Russia's proposal was rejected by the General Assembly with 107 votes in favour of a public vote, 13 against and 39 abstaining. A secret ballot vote on a resolution would have been highly unusual as United Nations votes are generally held in public.

== Voting ==
On 12 October 2022, the United Nations General Assembly, which required a two-thirds majority, adopted the resolution with 143 countries voting in favour, 5 voting against and 35 abstaining.

The resolution achieved the most votes in favour out of all resolutions adopted during the 11th Emergency Special Session of the General Assembly, which is focused on the Russian invasion of Ukraine. The resolution also achieved far more votes in favour than 2014 Resolution 68/262 rejecting the annexation of Crimea. As such, the overwhelming voting result on Resolution ES 11/4 went beyond the most optimistic expectations by Western sponsors.

Vote	Tally	States	Percent of votes	Percent of members
In favour	143	Afghanistan, Albania, Andorra, Angola, Antigua and Barbuda, Argentina, Australia, Austria, Bahamas, Bahrain, Bangladesh, Barbados, Belgium, Belize, Benin, Bhutan, Bosnia and Herzegovina, Botswana, Brazil, Brunei, Bulgaria, Cambodia, Canada, Cape Verde, Chad, Chile, Colombia, Comoros, Costa Rica, Côte d'Ivoire, Croatia, Cyprus, Czech Republic, Democratic Republic of the Congo, Denmark, Dominica, Dominican Republic, Ecuador, Egypt, Estonia, Fiji, Finland, France, Gabon, Gambia, Georgia, Germany, Ghana, Greece, Grenada, Guatemala, Guinea-Bissau, Guyana, Haiti, Hungary, Iceland, Indonesia, Iraq, Ireland, Israel, Italy, Jamaica, Japan, Jordan, Kenya, Kiribati, Kuwait, Latvia, Lebanon, Liberia, Libya, Liechtenstein, Lithuania, Luxembourg, Madagascar, Malawi, Malaysia, Maldives, Malta, Marshall Islands, Mauritania, Mauritius, Mexico, Micronesia, Moldova, Monaco, Montenegro, Morocco, Myanmar, Nauru, Nepal, Netherlands, New Zealand, Niger, Nigeria, North Macedonia, Norway, Oman, Palau, Panama, Papua New Guinea, Paraguay, Peru, Philippines, Poland, Portugal, Qatar, South Korea, Romania, Rwanda, Saint Kitts and Nevis, Saint Lucia, Saint Vincent and the Grenadines, Samoa, San Marino, Saudi Arabia, Senegal, Serbia, Seychelles, Sierra Leone, Singapore, Slovakia, Slovenia, Solomon Islands, Somalia, Spain, Suriname, Sweden, Switzerland, Timor-Leste, Tonga, Trinidad and Tobago, Tunisia, Turkey, Tuvalu, Ukraine, United Arab Emirates, United Kingdom, United States, Uruguay, Vanuatu, Yemen, Zambia	78.14%	74.09%
Against	5	Belarus, North Korea, Nicaragua, Russia, Syria	2.73%	2.59%
Abstain	35	Algeria, Armenia, Bolivia, Burundi, Central African Republic, China, Congo, Cuba, Eritrea, Eswatini, Ethiopia, Guinea, Honduras, India, Kazakhstan, Kyrgyzstan, Laos, Lesotho, Mali, Mongolia, Mozambique, Namibia, Pakistan, South Africa, South Sudan, Sri Lanka, Sudan, Tajikistan, Thailand, Togo, Uganda, Tanzania, Uzbekistan, Vietnam, Zimbabwe	19.13%	18.13%
Absent	10	Azerbaijan, Burkina Faso, Cameroon, Djibouti, El Salvador, Equatorial Guinea, Iran, São Tomé and Príncipe, Turkmenistan, Venezuela (Note: Venezuela was suspended from voting in the 76th session and the 11th emergency special session owing to its failure to pay dues in the previous two years, for which it did not receive a special waiver from the Assembly.)	–	5.18%
Total	193	–	100%	100%
Source: A/ES-11/4 voting record

== See also ==
- Eleventh emergency special session of the United Nations General Assembly
- Legality of the Russian invasion of Ukraine
- United Nations General Assembly Resolution 68/262
- Other United Nations General Assembly Resolutions with the prefix ES-11
- United Nations General Assembly Resolution A/RES/77/229
- United Nations General Assembly resolution
- United Nations Security Council Resolution 2623
