= United Nations General Assembly Resolution 68/262 =

United Nations General Assembly resolution adopted in 2014

UN General Assembly Resolution 68/262
| In favour |
| Against |
| Abstained |
| Absent |
| Non-UN member |
- Date: 27 March 2014
- Meeting no.: 80th Plenary
- Code: A/RES/68/262 (Document)
- Subject: Territorial Integrity of Ukraine
- Voting summary: 100 voted for; 11 voted against; 58 abstained; 24 absent
- Result: Resolution adopted

Map showing the vote for the United Nations General Assembly resolution 68/262 in Europe: In favour Against Abstained Absent Non-UN member

Map showing the United Nations General Assembly resolution 68/262 vote in Africa

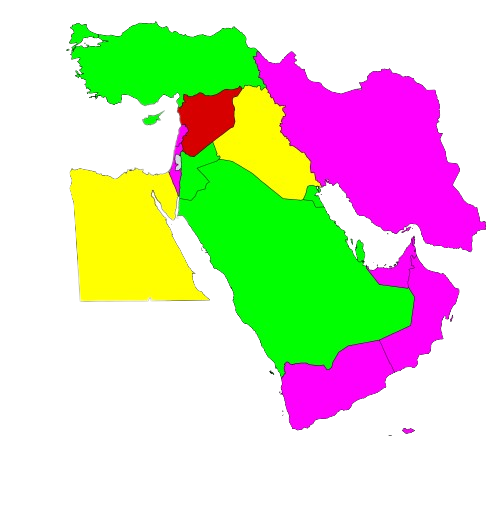
Map showing the United Nations General Assembly resolution 68/262 vote in the Middle East: In favour Against Abstained Absent Non-UN member

United Nations General Assembly Resolution 68/262 was adopted on 27 March 2014 by the sixty-eighth session of the United Nations General Assembly in response to the Russian annexation of Crimea and entitled "Territorial integrity of Ukraine". The nonbinding resolution, which was supported by 100 United Nations member states, affirmed the General Assembly's commitment to the territorial integrity of Ukraine within its internationally recognized borders and underscored the invalidity of the 2014 Crimean referendum. Eleven nations voted against the resolution, while 58 abstained, and a further 24 states were absent when the vote took place.

The resolution was introduced by Canada, Costa Rica, Germany, Lithuania, Poland, and Ukraine. The adoption of the resolution was preceded by the unsuccessful attempts of the United Nations Security Council, which convened seven sessions to address the Crimean crisis, only to face a Russian veto of draft resolution S/2014/189, sponsored by 42 countries.

== Voting rationales ==
Nicos Emiliou, permanent representative of Cyprus to the United Nations, who favoured the resolution, said that "Cyprus underlines the importance of respecting the fundamental principles of sovereignty, territorial integrity and independence of all states, including Ukraine". Emiliou urged to conduct a probe on all acts of violence and encouraged Russia to engage in a diplomatic solution.

The permanent representative of China to the United Nations, Liu Jieyi, whose country abstained from voting, stated that "in the context of the ongoing diplomatic mediation efforts by the parties concerned, an attempt to push ahead with the UNGA vote on the draft resolution on the question of Ukraine will only further complicate the situation".

== Russian reaction ==
On 28 March 2014, the Russian Federation stated that the resolution was counterproductive and accused Western states of using blackmail and threats to drum up approval votes.

== Voting ==
| Vote | Quantity | States | % of votes | % of total UN members |
|---|---|---|---|---|
| Approve | 100 | Albania, Andorra, Australia, Austria, Azerbaijan, Bahamas, Bahrain, Barbados, Belgium, Benin, Bhutan, Bulgaria, Cape Verde, Cameroon, Canada, Central African Republic, Chad, Chile, Colombia, Costa Rica, Croatia, Cyprus, Czech Republic, Democratic Republic of the Congo, Denmark, Dominican Republic, Estonia, Finland, France, Georgia, Germany, Greece, Guatemala, Guinea, Haiti, Honduras, Hungary, Iceland, Indonesia, Ireland, Italy, Japan, Jordan, Kiribati, Kuwait, Latvia, Liberia, Libya, Liechtenstein, Lithuania, Luxembourg, Madagascar, Malawi, Mauritius, Malaysia, Maldives, Malta, Marshall Islands, Mexico, Micronesia, Moldova, Monaco, Montenegro, Netherlands, New Zealand, Niger, Nigeria, North Macedonia, Norway, Palau, Panama, Papua New Guinea, Peru, Philippines, Poland, Portugal, Qatar, Romania, Samoa, San Marino, Saudi Arabia, Seychelles, Sierra Leone, Singapore, Slovakia, Slovenia, Solomon Islands, Somalia, Spain, South Korea, Sweden, Switzerland, Thailand, Togo, Trinidad and Tobago, Tunisia, Turkey, Ukraine, United Kingdom, United States | 59.17% | 51.81% |
| Against | 11 | Armenia, Belarus, Bolivia, Cuba, Nicaragua, North Korea, Russia, Sudan, Syria, Venezuela, Zimbabwe | 6.51% | 5.70% |
| Abstain | 58 | Afghanistan, Algeria, Angola, Antigua and Barbuda, Argentina, Bangladesh, Botswana, Brazil, Brunei, Burkina Faso, Burundi, Cambodia, China, Comoros, Djibouti, Dominica, Ecuador, Egypt, El Salvador, Eritrea, Ethiopia, Fiji, Gabon, Gambia, Guyana, India, Iraq, Jamaica, Kazakhstan, Kenya, Lesotho, Mali, Mauritania, Mongolia, Mozambique, Myanmar, Namibia, Nepal, Nauru, Pakistan, Paraguay, Rwanda, Saint Kitts and Nevis, Saint Lucia, Saint Vincent and the Grenadines, São Tomé and Príncipe, Senegal, South Africa, South Sudan, Sri Lanka, Suriname, Swaziland, Tanzania, Uganda, Uruguay, Uzbekistan, Vietnam, Zambia | 34.32% | 30.05% |
| Absent | 24 | Belize, Bosnia and Herzegovina, Republic of the Congo, Côte d'Ivoire, Equatorial Guinea, Ghana, Grenada, Guinea-Bissau, Iran, Israel, Kyrgyzstan, Laos, Lebanon, Morocco, Oman, Serbia, Tajikistan, Timor-Leste, Tonga, Turkmenistan, Tuvalu, United Arab Emirates, Vanuatu, Yemen | – | 12.44% |
| Total | 193 | – | 100% | 100% |

== Related resolutions ==
- Res. 71/205, 19 December 2016, "Situation of human rights in the Autonomous Republic of Crimea and the city of Sevastopol (Ukraine)."
- Res. 72/190, 19 December 2017, "Situation of human rights in the Autonomous Republic of Crimea and the city of Sevastopol, Ukraine."
- Res. 73/194, 17 December 2018, "Problem of the militarization of the Autonomous Republic of Crimea and the city of Sevastopol, Ukraine, as well as parts of the Black Sea and the Sea of Azov."
- Res. 73/263, 22 December 2018, "Situation of human rights in the Autonomous Republic of Crimea and the city of Sevastopol, Ukraine."
- Res. 74/17, 9 December 2019, "Problem of the militarization of the Autonomous Republic of Crimea and the city of Sevastopol, Ukraine, as well as parts of the Black Sea and the Sea of Azov."
- Res. 74/168, 18 December 2019, "Situation of human rights in the Autonomous Republic of Crimea and the city of Sevastopol, Ukraine."
- Res. 75/29, 7 December 2020, "Problem of the militarization of the Autonomous Republic of Crimea and the city of Sevastopol, Ukraine, as well as parts of the Black Sea and the Sea of Azov."
- Res. 75/192, 16 December 2020, "Situation of human rights in the Autonomous Republic of Crimea and the city of Sevastopol, Ukraine."
- Res. 76/70, 9 December 2021, "Problem of the militarization of the Autonomous Republic of Crimea and the city of Sevastopol, Ukraine, as well as parts of the Black Sea and the Sea of Azov"
- Res. 76/179, 16 December 2021, "Situation of human rights in the temporarily occupied Autonomous Republic of Crimea and the city of Sevastopol, Ukraine"
- Resolutions of the Eleventh emergency special session of the UNGA

== See also ==
- Prelude to the Russian invasion of Ukraine
- Russian invasion of Ukraine
- Eleventh emergency special session of the United Nations General Assembly:
  - ES-11/1: "Aggression against Ukraine"
  - ES-11/2: "Humanitarian consequences of the aggression against Ukraine"
  - ES-11/3: "Suspension of the rights of membership of the Russian Federation in the Human Rights Council"
  - ES-11/4: "Territorial integrity of Ukraine"
  - ES-11/5: "Furtherance of remedy and reparation for aggression against Ukraine"
  - ES-11/6: "Principles of the Charter of the United Nations underlying a comprehensive, just and lasting peace in Ukraine"
  - United Nations General Assembly Resolution ES-11/7
  - United Nations General Assembly Resolution ES-11/8
- Legality of the Russian invasion of Ukraine
- United Nations Security Council Resolution 2623
