= United Nations General Assembly Resolution ES-11/2 =

Humanitarian consequences of the aggression against Ukraine 2022

UN General Assembly Resolution ES-11/2
In favour
Against
Abstained
Absent
Non-UN member
- Date: 24 March 2022
- Meeting no.: 11th Emergency Special Session (continued)
- Code: A/RES/ES-11/2 (Document)
- Subject: Humanitarian consequences of the aggression against Ukraine
- Voting summary: 140 voted for; 5 voted against; 38 abstained; 10 absent
- Result: Resolution adopted

The United Nations General Assembly Resolution ES-11/2 is the second resolution of the eleventh emergency special session of the United Nations General Assembly, adopted on 24 March 2022, following Resolution ES-11/1 which was adopted on 2 March 2022. Resolution ES‑11/2 reaffirmed the UN's former commitments and obligations under its Charter, and reiterated its demand that Russia withdraw from Ukraine's recognized sovereign territory; it also deplored, expressed grave concern over and condemned attacks on civilian populations and infrastructure. Fourteen principles were agreed.

== Background ==
An emergency special session is an unscheduled meeting of the United Nations General Assembly to make urgent recommendations on a particular situation relevant for the maintenance of international peace and security in any instance where the Security Council fails to act owing to the veto of a permanent member.

The mechanism was introduced in 1950 with the Uniting for Peace resolution, which declared that:

...if the Security Council, because of lack of unanimity of the permanent members, fails to exercise its primary responsibility for the maintenance of international peace and security in any case where there appears to be a threat to the peace, breach of the peace, or act of aggression, the General Assembly shall consider the matter immediately with a view to making appropriate recommendations to Members for collective measures, including in the case of a breach of the peace or act of aggression the use of armed force when necessary, to maintain or restore international peace and security. If not in session at the time, the General Assembly may meet in emergency special session within twenty-four hours of the request therefore.

The General Assembly's ability to recommend collective measures was the subject of an intense dispute in the 1950s and 1960s. In 1962, an advisory opinion of the International Court of Justice stated that, while "enforcement action" is the exclusive domain of the Security Council, the General Assembly has the authority to take a wide range of decisions, including establishing a peacekeeping force.

== 11th Emergency Special Session ==
On 24 February 2022, Russia launched a large-scale invasion against Ukraine. A draft resolution deploring the invasion and calling for the withdrawal of Russian troops was vetoed in the Security Council the following day, prompting the Security Council to convene an emergency special session on the subject of Ukraine with United Nations Security Council Resolution 2623. An emergency special session on 25 February issued Resolution ES-11/1 of 2 March which deplored Russia's invasion of Ukraine and demanded a full withdrawal of Russian forces and a reversal of its decision to recognise the self-declared People's Republics of Donetsk and Luhansk. The paragraph 10 of the United Nations General Assembly Resolution of 2 March 2022 confirmed the involvement of Belarus in unlawful use of force against Ukraine. The resolution was sponsored by 96 countries, and passed with 141 voting in favour, 5 against, and 35 abstentions. Military action by the Russian Federation continued and the 11th Emergency Session was resumed; on 24 March it issued Resolution ES-11/2, and on 7 April issued Resolution ES-11/3. The eleventh ESS has been 'adjourned' and 'resumed' on numerous occasions over the past several years, and remains temporarily adjourned. Indeed, over twenty separate 'plenary meetings' have been held by the Assembly, whilst sitting in the eleventh ESS, since 2022.

== Resolution ES-11/2 and voting ==
The resolution reaffirmed its former commitments and obligations under the United Nations Charter. It reiterated its demand that Russia withdraw from Ukraine's recognized sovereign territory; it also deplored, expressed grave concern over and condemned attacks on civilian populations and infrastructure. Fourteen principles were agreed. Briefly, the principles demanded the full implementation of resolution ES-11/1, immediate cessation of the hostilities by the Russian Federation against Ukraine, full protection of civilians, including humanitarian personnel, journalists and persons in vulnerable situations, and encouraged "continued negotiation". The 11th Emergency Session was adjourned.

=== Voting ===
Vote	Tally	States	Percent of votes	Percent of members
In favour	140	Afghanistan, Albania, Andorra, Antigua and Barbuda, Argentina, Australia, Austria, Bahamas, Bahrain, Bangladesh, Barbados, Belgium, Belize, Benin, Bhutan, Bosnia and Herzegovina, Brazil, Bulgaria, Cambodia, Canada, Cape Verde, Chad, Chile, Colombia, Costa Rica, Côte d'Ivoire, Croatia, Cyprus, Czech Republic, Democratic Republic of the Congo, Denmark, Djibouti, Dominican Republic, Ecuador, Egypt, Estonia, Fiji, Finland, France, Gabon, Gambia, Georgia, Germany, Ghana, Greece, Grenada, Guatemala, Guyana, Haiti, Honduras, Hungary, Iceland, Indonesia, Iraq, Ireland, Israel, Italy, Jamaica, Japan, Jordan, Kenya, Kiribati, Kuwait, Latvia, Lebanon, Lesotho, Liberia, Libya, Liechtenstein, Lithuania, Luxembourg, Malawi, Malaysia, Maldives, Malta, Marshall Islands, Mauritania, Mauritius, Mexico, Micronesia, Moldova, Monaco, Montenegro, Myanmar, Nauru, Nepal, Netherlands, New Zealand, Niger, Nigeria, North Macedonia, Norway, Oman, Palau, Panama, Papua New Guinea, Paraguay, Peru, Philippines, Poland, Portugal, Qatar, South Korea, Romania, Rwanda, Saint Kitts and Nevis, Saint Lucia, Saint Vincent and the Grenadines, Samoa, San Marino, São Tomé and Príncipe, Saudi Arabia, Senegal, Serbia, Seychelles, Sierra Leone, Singapore, Slovakia, Slovenia, Solomon Islands, South Sudan, Spain, Suriname, Sweden, Switzerland, Thailand, Timor-Leste, Tonga, Trinidad and Tobago, Tunisia, Turkey, Tuvalu, Ukraine, United Arab Emirates, United Kingdom, United States, Uruguay, Vanuatu, Yemen, Zambia	76.50%	72.54%
Against	5	Belarus, Eritrea, North Korea, Russia, Syria	2.73%	2.59%
Abstain	38	Algeria, Angola, Armenia, Bolivia, Botswana, Brunei, Burundi, Central African Republic, China, Cuba, El Salvador, Equatorial Guinea, Eswatini, Ethiopia, Guinea-Bissau, India, Iran, Kazakhstan, Kyrgyzstan, Laos, Madagascar, Mali, Mongolia, Mozambique, Namibia, Nicaragua, Pakistan, Republic of the Congo, South Africa, Sri Lanka, Sudan, Tajikistan, Togo, Tanzania, Uganda, Uzbekistan, Vietnam, Zimbabwe	20.77%	19.69%
Absent	10	Azerbaijan, Burkina Faso, Cameroon, Comoros, Dominica, Guinea, Morocco, Somalia, Turkmenistan, Venezuela (Note: Venezuela was suspended from voting in the 76th session and the 11th emergency special session owing to its failure to pay dues in the previous two years, for which it did not receive a special waiver from the Assembly.)	–	5.18%
Total	193	–	100%	100%
Source: A/ES-11/L.2 voting record

== See also ==
- Eleventh emergency special session of the United Nations General Assembly
- Legality of the Russian invasion of Ukraine
- United Nations General Assembly Resolution 68/262
- Other United Nations General Assembly Resolutions with the prefix ES-11
- United Nations General Assembly Resolution A/RES/77/229
- United Nations General Assembly resolution
- United Nations Security Council Resolution 2623
