= United Nations General Assembly Resolution ES-11/7 =

2025 UN General Assemble Resolution at 11th ESS

UN General Assembly Resolution ES-11/7
Yes
No
Abstained
Absent
Non-UN member
- Date: 24 February 2025
- Meeting no.: 11th Emergency Special Session (continued)
- Code: A/RES/ES-11/7 (Document)
- Subject: Advancing a comprehensive, just and lasting peace in Ukraine
- Voting summary: 93 voted for; 18 voted against; 65 abstained; 17 absent
- Result: Adopted

United Nations General Assembly Resolution ES‑11/7 is the seventh resolution of the eleventh emergency special session of the United Nations General Assembly, adopted on 24 February 2025 about principles of the Charter of the United Nations underlying a comprehensive, just and lasting peace in Ukraine. The eleventh ESS has been 'adjourned' and 'resumed' on numerous occasions over the past several years, and remains temporarily adjourned. Indeed, more than twenty separate 'plenary meetings' have been held by the Assembly, whilst sitting in the eleventh ESS, since 2022.

== Voting ==
Vote	Tally	States	% of votes	% of total UN members
Approve	93	Albania, Andorra, Antigua and Barbuda, Australia, Austria, Bahamas, Barbados, Belgium, Belize, Bhutan, Bosnia-Herzegovina, Bulgaria, Cambodia, Canada, Cape Verde, Chile, Comoros, Côte d'Ivoire, Croatia, Cyprus, Czech Republic, Denmark, Djibouti, Egypt, Estonia, Fiji, Finland, France, The Gambia, Germany, Greece, Guatemala, Guyana, Iceland, Indonesia, Ireland, Italy, Jamaica, Japan, Jordan, Latvia, Liberia, Liechtenstein, Lithuania, Luxembourg, Malaysia, Maldives, Malta, Mauritius, Mexico, Moldova, Monaco, Montenegro, Myanmar, (Note: The Russia-aligned State Administration Council, in power since 2021, cannot vote at the United Nations; the vote is from the National Unity Government of Myanmar, in exile since 2021.) Nauru, Nepal, Netherlands, New Zealand, Nigeria, Norway, Papua New Guinea, Peru, Philippines, Poland, Portugal, Republic of Korea, Romania, Saint Kitts and Nevis, Saint Lucia, Samoa, San Marino, Serbia, Seychelles, Sierra Leone, Singapore, Slovakia, Slovenia, Solomon Islands, Somalia, Spain, Suriname, Sweden, Switzerland, Thailand, Timor-Leste, Tonga, Trinidad and Tobago, Tunisia, Turkey, Ukraine, United Kingdom, Uruguay, Vanuatu	52.84%	48.18%
Against	18	Belarus, Burkina Faso, Burundi, Central African Republic, Equatorial Guinea, Eritrea, Haiti, Hungary, Israel, Mali, Marshall Islands, Nicaragua, Niger, North Korea, Palau, Russia, Sudan, United States	10.23%	9.33%
Abstain	65	Algeria, Angola, Argentina, Armenia, Bahrain, Bangladesh, Botswana, Brazil, Brunei, Chad, China, Colombia, Costa Rica, Cuba, Dominican Republic, El Salvador, Ethiopia, Gabon, Ghana, Grenada, Guinea, Honduras, India, Iran, Iraq, Kazakhstan, Kenya, Kiribati, Kuwait, Kyrgyzstan, Laos, Lebanon, Lesotho, Libya, Malawi, Mauritania, Micronesia, Mongolia, Mozambique, Namibia, North Macedonia, Oman, Pakistan, Panama, Paraguay, Qatar, Rwanda, Saint Vincent and the Grenadines, Sao Tome and Principe, Saudi Arabia, Senegal, South Africa, Sri Lanka, Syria, Tajikistan, Togo, Tuvalu, Uganda, United Arab Emirates, Tanzania, Uzbekistan, Vietnam, Yemen, Zambia, Zimbabwe	36.93%	33.68%
Absent	17	Afghanistan, Azerbaijan, Benin, Bolivia, Cameroon, Democratic Republic of the Congo, Republic of the Congo, Dominica, Ecuador, Eswatini, Georgia, Guinea-Bissau, Madagascar, Morocco, South Sudan, Turkmenistan, Venezuela (Note: Venezuela was suspended from voting in the 76th session and the 11th emergency special session owing to its failure to pay dues in the previous two years, for which it did not receive a special waiver from the Assembly.)	–	8.81%
Total	193	–	100%	100%
Source: A/ES-11/7 voting record

== Resolution ==
The General Assembly, Reaffirming the purposes and principles enshrined in the Charter of the United Nations, and recalling its resolutions adopted at its eleventh emergency special session, its resolution 68/262 of 27 March 2014 and its resolution 78/316 of 11 July 2024,

Noting with concern that the full-scale invasion of Ukraine by the Russian Federation has persisted for three years and continues to have devastating and long - lasting consequences not only for Ukraine, but also for other regions and global stability,

Reiterating that the early achievement of a comprehensive, just and lasting peace would constitute a significant contribution to strengthening international peace and security,

Recalling the obligation of all States under Article 2 of the Charter to refrain in their international relations from the threat or use of force against the territorial integrity or political independence of any State, or in any other manner inconsistent with the purposes of the United Nations, and to settle their international disputes by peaceful means,

Reaffirming its commitment to the sovereignty, independence, unity and territorial integrity of Ukraine within its internationally recognized borders, extending to its territorial waters,

Reaffirming that no territorial acquisition resulting from the threat or use of force shall be recognized as legal,

A/RES/ES-11/7 Advancing a comprehensive, just and lasting peace in Ukraine 25-031032/3

Deploring the dire human rights and humanitarian consequences of the aggression, and condemning all attacks against civilians and civilian objects, including those that are critical energy infrastructure,

Deploring also the particular impact that the aggression has on women and children, including as refugees and internally displaced persons, and other civilians who have specific needs, including persons with disabilities and older persons, Expressing its deep concern at the war's profound and long-lasting effects on the mental health of people, in particular children, amplifying the trauma and its consequences for future generations,

Noting with deep concern the ongoing adverse impact of the war on global food security, energy, the global economy, nuclear security and safety and the environment, Recalling the order of provisional measures of the International Court of Justice of 16 March 2022,

Stressing that any involvement of troops of the Democratic People's Republic of Korea fighting alongside forces of the Russian Federation raises serious concerns regarding further escalation of this conflict,

1. Calls for a de-escalation, an early cessation of hostilities and a peaceful resolution of the war against Ukraine, marked by enormous destruction and human suffering, including among the civilian population, in line with the Charter of the United Nations and international law;

2. Reiterates the urgent need to end the war this year, and to redouble diplomatic efforts to reduce the risks of further escalation and achieve a comprehensive, just and lasting peace in Ukraine, consistent with the Charter, including its principles of sovereign equality and territorial integrity of States, as underscored in its resolution ES-11/6 of 23 February 2023, and notes the multilateral processes to this end;

3. Takes note of the efforts by various Member States in mitigating the effects of the war and in presenting their visions for a comprehensive and lasting settlement through inclusive diplomacy, dialogue and political means based on the Charter and international law;

4. Recalls the need for full implementation of its relevant resolutions adopted in response to the aggression against Ukraine, in particular its demand that the Russian Federation immediately, completely and unconditionally withdraw all of its military forces from the territory of Ukraine within its internationally recognized borders, and its demand for an immediate cessation of the hostilities by the Russian Federation against Ukraine, in particular of any attacks against civilians and civilian objects;

5. Emphasizes the need to ensure accountability for the most serious crimes under international law committed on the territory of Ukraine through appropriate, fair and independent investigations and prosecutions at the national or international level, and ensure justice for all victims and the prevention of future crimes;

6. Reiterates its call for the complete exchange of prisoners of war, the release of all unlawfully detained persons and the return of all internees and of civilians forcibly transferred and deported, including children;

7. Calls upon the parties to the armed conflict to fully comply with international law, including international humanitarian law, notably with regard to the protection of civilians, especially women and children, and persons hors de combat, as well as civilian objects, and to ensure safe and unhindered humanitarian access to those in need;

8. Reiterates its call for the immediate cessation of attacks against critical energy infrastructure, which increase the risk of a nuclear accident or incident;

9. Urges all Member States to cooperate in the spirit of solidarity to address the global impacts of the war on food security, energy, finance, nuclear security and safety and the environment, underscores that arrangements for a comprehensive, just and lasting peace in Ukraine should take into account these factors, and calls upon Member States to support the Secretary-General in his efforts to address these impacts;

10. Decides to adjourn the eleventh emergency special session of the General Assembly temporarily and to authorize the President of the General Assembly to resume its meetings upon request from Member States.

20th plenary meeting
24 February 2025

== Notable votes ==
=== United States ===
The U.S. had been a strong supporter of Ukraine under the presidency of Joe Biden; however, since the start of the second presidency of Donald Trump, it has moved towards a normalization of relations with Russia, pursuing a negotiated settlement of the Russo-Ukrainian war. The U.S. voted against the resolution—and, in doing so, against Ukraine—in support of Russia.

Alongside this resolution, the US introduced a separate resolution in the General Assembly which was worded in neutral terms and did not condemn Russia. However, the Assembly approved several amendments adding wording which condemned Russia; the US therefore ended up abstaining on its own resolution.

The US later re-introduced that resolution in the Security Council, which ultimately approved it.

=== Serbia ===
Serbian President Aleksandar Vučić apologised to the citizens of Serbia for mistakenly voting in favour of the resolution and said that the country should have abstained from voting instead.

=== Slovakia ===
Slovakia coalition partner Slovak National Party criticised Slovakia's vote for support for the Resolution, suggesting that Slovakia should have opposed the resolution in line with Hungary's position.

=== Hungary ===
Hungary was the only EU member state to vote against the resolution.

=== Israel ===
Israel was the only Middle Eastern state to vote against the resolution, while Iran abstained. This was likely due to US pressure.

== See also ==
- Eleventh emergency special session of the United Nations General Assembly
- Legality of the Russian invasion of Ukraine
- United Nations General Assembly Resolution 68/262
- Other United Nations General Assembly Resolutions with the prefix ES-11
