= Marko Milanović (professor) =

International lawyer and legal scholar

Marko Milanović is Professor of Public International Law at the School of Law of the University of Reading and from 2025-2027 he is Raoul Wallenberg Visiting Chair in Human Rights and Humanitarian Law at Lund University's Raoul Wallenberg Institute of Human Rights and Humanitarian Law. He is an editor of the European Journal of International Law and its blog, EJIL: Talk!.

He is co-general editor of the ongoing Tallinn Manual 3.0 project on the application of international law in cyberspace and a Senior Fellow at the NATO Cooperative Cyber Defence Centre of Excellence. In recognition of his work on the application of international law to cyberspace Milanović was awarded the Serge Lazareff Prize for excellence in legal services by the NATO Allied Command Operations Office of Legal Affairs. He is Of-Counsel at Cyber Law International, an international law firm.

Milanović advised the panel of experts in international law convened at the request of the Prosecutor of the International Criminal Court in support of his investigation into the situation in the State of Palestine. In 2024 he was appointed by the Prosecutor of the International Criminal Court as Special Adviser on Cyber-Enabled Crimes where he led the drafting of a Draft Policy on Cyber-Enabled Crimes.

He is currently part of the Task Force on Accountability for Crimes Committed in Ukraine which is advising the Prosecutor General of Ukraine. He previously assisted the UN High Commissioner on Human Rights on the comprehensive examination of alleged human rights violations committed in Belarus since 1 May 2020.

== Works ==
- Milanovic, M. (2006). "State Responsibility for Genocide". European Journal of International Law. 17 (3): 553–604. doi:10.1093/ejil/chl019. hdl:10536/DRO/DU:30126323.
- Milanovic, M. (2008). "From Compromise to Principle: Clarifying the Concept of State Jurisdiction in Human Rights Treaties". Human Rights Law Review. 8 (3): 411–448. doi:10.1093/hrlr/ngn021.
- Milanović, Marko; Papić, Tatjana (2009). "As Bad as It Gets: The European Court of Human Rights's Behrami and Saramati Decision and General International Law". International and Comparative Law Quarterly. 58 (2): 267–296. doi:10.1017/S002058930900102X. S2CID 145693015.
- Milanovic, Marko (2009–2010). "Norm Conflict in International Law: Whither Human Rights". Duke Journal of Comparative & International Law. 20: 69.
- Milanovic, Marko (2011). Extraterritorial Application of Human Rights Treaties: Law, Principles, and Policy. Oxford University Press. ISBN 978-0-19-150480-8.
- Milanovic, M. (2012). "Al-Skeini and Al-Jedda in Strasbourg". European Journal of International Law. 23 (1): 121–139. doi:10.1093/ejil/chr102. hdl:10536/DRO/DU:30092589.
- Milanovic, Marko; Wood, Michael, eds. (2015). The Law and Politics of the Kosovo Advisory Opinion. Oxford University Press. ISBN 978-0-19-871751-5.
