= Geneva Academy of International Humanitarian Law and Human Rights =

- Académie de droit international humanitaire et de droits humains à Genève
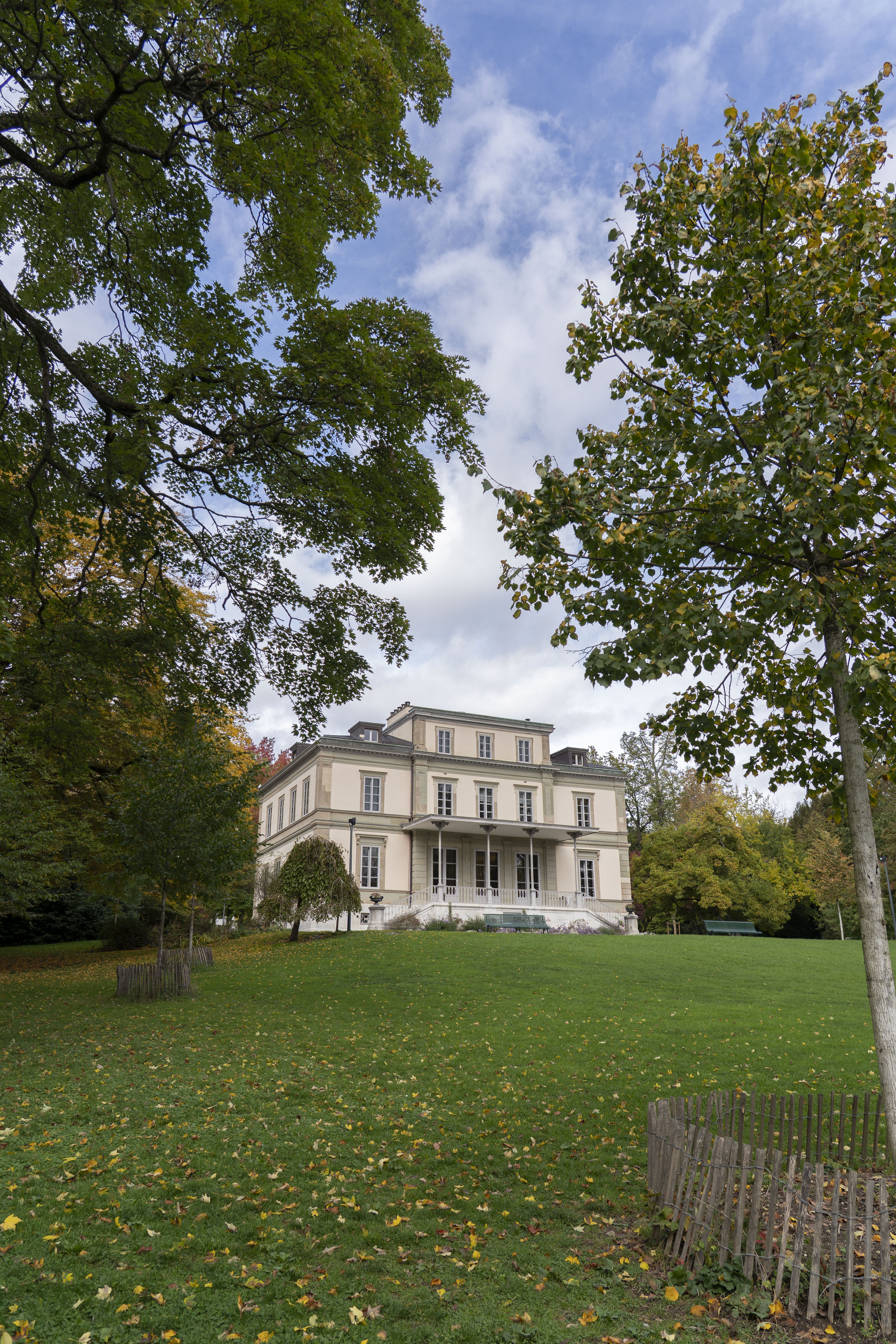
- Villa Moynier
- Established: 2006
- Affiliations: University of Geneva; The Graduate Institute
- Location: Geneva, Switzerland
- Website: www.geneva-academy.ch

The Geneva Academy of International Humanitarian Law and Human Rights (French: Académie de droit international humanitaire et de droits humains à Genève) is a postgraduate joint center (of the University of Geneva and the Graduate Institute of International and Development Studies) founded in 2006 and located in Geneva, Switzerland. The faculty includes professors from both founding institutions and visiting professors from major universities.

It is located in Villa Moynier, built in 1845 and previously owned by Gustave Moynier, co-founder and first President of the International Committee of the Red Cross. The first Geneva Convention of 1864 was drafted here, an event that marked the birth of modern humanitarian law.

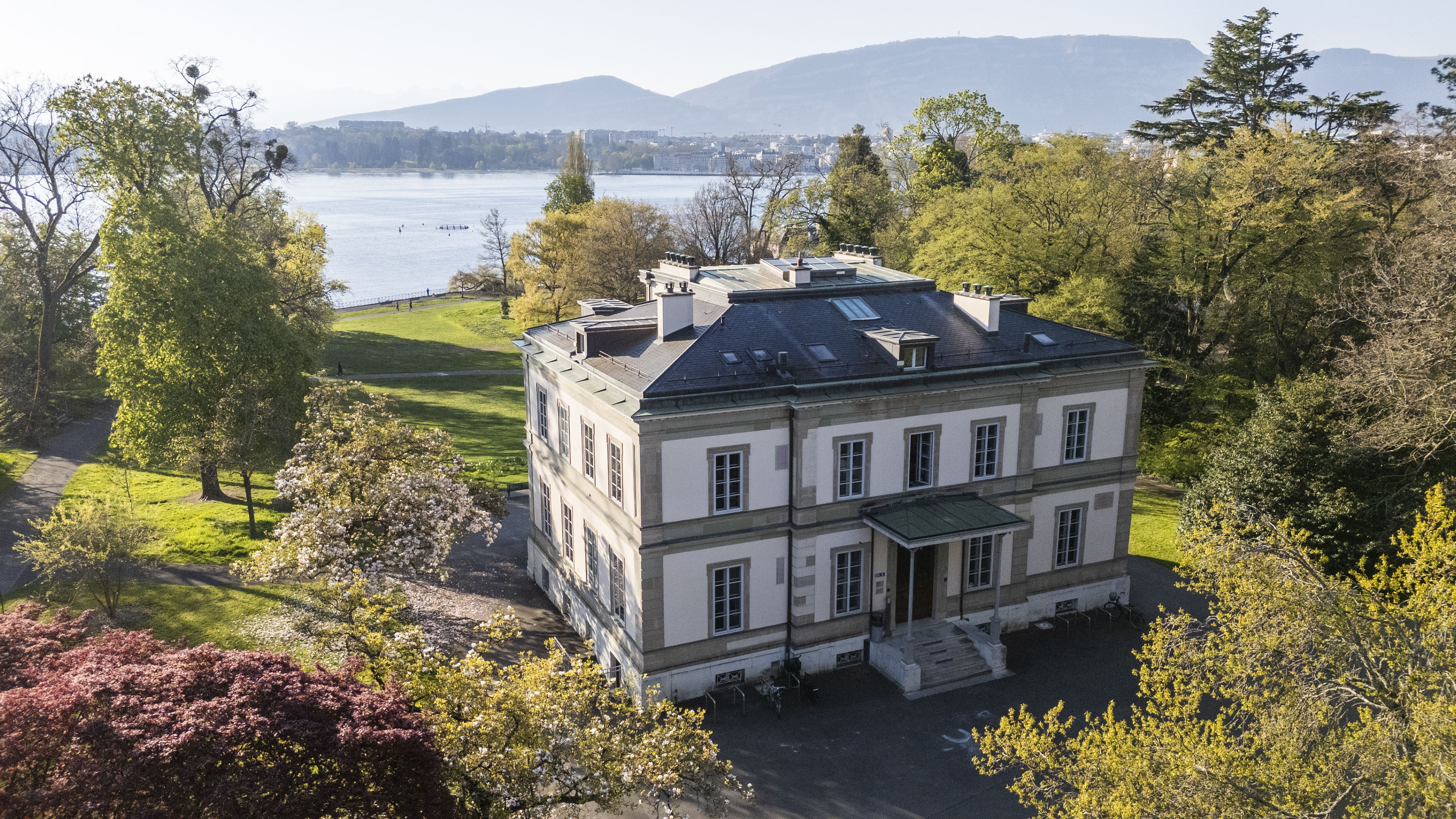
Villa Moynier on the shore of Lac Leman

== History ==
Established in 2006, the Geneva Academy of International Humanitarian Law and Human Rights builds on the legacy of the Centre Universitaire de Droit International Humanitaire (CUDIH), created in 2002 as a joint initiative of the Faculty of Law of the University of Geneva and the Geneva Graduate Institute of International Studies (HEI), today the Geneva Graduate Institute. Supported by the Swiss Confederation and the Canton of Geneva, the CUDIH was conceived as a centre of excellence to strengthen Geneva’s position as the global capital of humanitarian law and to foster academic cooperation with the International Committee of the Red Cross (ICRC). Its creation responded to the establishment of the United Nations Human Rights Council in 2006, which replaced the former Commission on Human Rights.

Directors have included, Andrew Clapham (first Director from 2006–2014), Paola Gaeta, Robert Roth, Marco Sassòli, and Gloria Gaggioli.

== Education ==
The Geneva Academy offers two specialized one-year LLM–Master of Advanced Studies programmes and a two-year part time Executive Master of Advanced Studies. Alongside these are a range of training and short courses for professionals on legal issues related to armed conflicts, human rights protection, transitional justice and international criminal justice.

== Research ==
The Geneva Academy conducts legal research and policy studies in the fields of international law in armed conflict, human rights protection, transitional justice, international criminal justice, weapons law, and economic, social and cultural rights.

Current research projects include IHL in Focus, providing legal analysis of harm suffered by civilians in situations of armed conflict, RULAC, an independent and authoritative set of legal classifications of situations of armed conflict worldwide, and War WATCH, a portal for the legal monitoring of armed conflicts and the assessment of civilian harm worldwide.
