= United Nations General Assembly Resolution ES-11/6 =

UN General Assemble Resolution ES-11/6

UN General Assembly Resolution ES-11/6
In favour
Against
Abstained
Absent
Non-UN member
- Date: 23 February 2023
- Meeting no.: 11th Emergency Special Session (continued)
- Code: A/RES/ES-11/6 (Document)
- Subject: Principles of the Charter of the United Nations underlying a comprehensive, just and lasting peace in Ukraine
- Voting summary: 141 voted for; 7 voted against; 32 abstained; 13 absent
- Result: Adopted

United Nations General Assembly Resolution ES‑11/6 is the sixth resolution of the eleventh emergency special session of the United Nations General Assembly, adopted on 23 February 2023 about principles of the Charter of the United Nations underlying a comprehensive, just and lasting peace in Ukraine.

== Voting ==
Vote	Tally	States	% of votes	% of total UN members
Approve	141	Afghanistan, Albania, Andorra, Antigua and Barbuda, Argentina, Australia, Austria, Bahamas, Bahrain, Barbados, Belgium, Belize, Benin, Bhutan, Bosnia-Herzegovina, Botswana, Brazil, Brunei, Bulgaria, Cambodia, Canada, Cape Verde, Chad, Chile, Colombia, Comoros, Costa Rica, Côte d'Ivoire, Croatia, Cyprus, Czech Republic, Democratic Republic of the Congo, Denmark, Djibouti, Dominican Republic, Ecuador, Egypt, Estonia, Fiji, Finland, France, The Gambia, Georgia, Germany, Ghana, Greece, Guatemala, Guyana, Haiti, Honduras, Hungary, Iceland, Indonesia, Iraq, Ireland, Israel, Italy, Jamaica, Japan, Jordan, Kenya, Kiribati, Kuwait, Latvia, Lesotho, Liberia, Libya, Liechtenstein, Lithuania, Luxembourg, Madagascar, Malawi, Malaysia, Maldives, Malta, Marshall Islands, Mauritania, Mauritius, Mexico, Micronesia, Moldova, Monaco, Morocco, Montenegro, Myanmar, Nauru, Nepal, Netherlands, New Zealand, Niger, Nigeria, North Macedonia, Norway, Oman, Palau, Panama, Papua New Guinea, Paraguay, Peru, Philippines, Poland, Portugal, Qatar, Republic of Korea, Romania, Rwanda, Saint Kitts and Nevis, Saint Lucia, Saint Vincent and the Grenadines, Samoa, San Marino, São Tomé and Príncipe, Saudi Arabia, Serbia, Seychelles, Sierra Leone, Singapore, Slovakia, Slovenia, Solomon Islands, Somalia, South Sudan, Spain, Suriname, Sweden, Switzerland, Thailand, Timor-Leste, Tonga, Trinidad and Tobago, Tunisia, Turkey, Tuvalu, Ukraine, United Arab Emirates, United Kingdom, United States, Uruguay, Vanuatu, Yemen, Zambia	78.33%	73.06%
Against	7	Belarus, Eritrea, Mali, Nicaragua, North Korea, Russia, Syria	3.89%	3.63%
Abstain	32	Algeria, Angola, Armenia, Bangladesh, Bolivia, Burundi, Central African Republic, China, Congo, Cuba, El Salvador, Ethiopia, Gabon, Guinea, India, Iran, Kazakhstan, Kyrgyzstan, Laos, Mongolia, Mozambique, Namibia, Pakistan, South Africa, Sri Lanka, Sudan, Tajikistan, Togo, Uganda, Uzbekistan, Vietnam, Zimbabwe	17.78%	16.58%
Absent	13	Azerbaijan, Burkina Faso, Cameroon, Dominica, Equatorial Guinea, Eswatini, Grenada, Guinea-Bissau, Lebanon, Senegal, Turkmenistan, Tanzania, Venezuela (Note: Venezuela was suspended from voting in the 76th session and the 11th emergency special session owing to its failure to pay dues in the previous two years, for which it did not receive a special waiver from the Assembly.)	–	6.73%
Total	193	–	100%	100%
Source: A/ES-11/6 voting record

== See also ==
- Eleventh emergency special session of the United Nations General Assembly
- Legality of the Russian invasion of Ukraine
- United Nations General Assembly Resolution 68/262
- Other United Nations General Assembly Resolutions with the prefix ES-11
- United Nations General Assembly Resolution A/RES/77/229
- United Nations General Assembly resolution
- United Nations Security Council Resolution 2623
