= Task Force on Accountability for Crimes Committed in Ukraine =

Unpaid international group of lawyers

- Established: 29 March 2022 (3 years ago)
- Founders: Government of Ukraine
- Types: organization

The Task Force on Accountability for Crimes Committed in Ukraine is a pro bono international group of lawyers established on 29 March 2022 to help Ukrainian prosecutors coordinate legal cases for war crimes and other crimes related to the 2022 Russian invasion of Ukraine.

== Creation ==
In late March 2022, during the 2022 Russian invasion of Ukraine, the Prosecutor General of Ukraine Iryna Venediktova announced the creation of an international legal task force that would support Ukrainian prosecutors in coordinating legal cases in multiple courts in several jurisdictions for war crimes related to the invasion. Venediktova stated that the Ukrainian prosecutors had collected 2500 "possible war crimes cases", including the Mariupol theatre airstrike, and "several hundred suspects".

== Composition ==
The task force includes individual British lawyers Amal Clooney, Helena Kennedy, Richard Hermer, Tim Otty, Philippa Webb and Lord Neuberger. Lawyers from legal firms already representing Ukraine, Nikhil Gore from Covington & Burling, Luke Vidal from Sygna Partners and Emma Lindsay from Withers LLP, are also included in the task force. Professors of international humanitarian law Marko Milanovic and Andrew Clapham are included in the team.

The task force members and associated staff are required to work pro bono.

== Aims ==
The task force aims to make recommendations for legal actions in national jurisdictions in several countries, in guiding cooperation with the International Criminal Court investigation in Ukraine, and in searching for assets of suspects that could be seized and used in compensation to victims or for rebuilding Ukraine.

== See also ==
- Legality of the 2022 Russian invasion of Ukraine
