= United Nations General Assembly Resolution ES-11/8 =

2025 UN General Assemble Resolution of 11th ESS

UN General Assembly Resolution ES-11/8
- Date: 24 February 2025
- Meeting no.: 11th Emergency Special Session (continued)
- Code: A/RES/ES-11/8 (Document)
- Subject: The path to peace
- Voting summary: 93 voted for; 8 voted against; 73 abstained; 19 present not voting
- Result: Adopted

United Nations General Assembly Resolution ES-11/8 titled "The Path to Peace" is a resolution of the United Nations General Assembly about the Russian invasion of Ukraine. It was adopted on 24 February 2025, with 93 countries voting for, 8 against, 73 abstained, and 19 present not voting at the eleventh ESS. The session has been 'adjourned' and 'resumed' on numerous occasions over the past several years, and remains temporarily adjourned. Indeed, more than twenty separate 'plenary meetings' have been held by the Assembly, whilst sitting in the eleventh ESS, since 2022.

== Voting results ==
Vote	Tally	States
In favour	93	Includes Australia, Canada, France, Germany, Italy, Japan, Mexico, South Korea, South Africa, Spain and United Kingdom
Against	8	Belarus, Burkina Faso, Mali, Nicaragua, Niger, North Korea, Russia, Sudan
Abstain	73	Includes Argentina, Brazil, China, Colombia, India, Israel, Saudi Arabia, United Arab Emirates, United States and Vietnam
Present not voting	19	Afghanistan, Azerbaijan, Bahamas, Benin, Bolivia, Cameroon, Chad, Republic of the Congo, Dominica, Ecuador, Eswatini, Guinea-Bissau, Honduras, Nauru, Samoa, South Sudan, Turkmenistan, Vanuatu, Venezuela

== See also ==
- Eleventh emergency special session of the United Nations General Assembly – 2022 ongoing session of the United Nations General Assembly
- Legality of the Russian invasion of Ukraine
- United Nations Security Council Resolution 2774 – 2025 non-procedural resolution on Russo-Ukrainian war
- United Nations Security Council Resolution 2623 – 2022 resolution for an emergency meeting on the Russian invasion of Ukraine
- United Nations General Assembly Resolution 68/262 – United Nations General Assembly resolution adopted in 2014
- Other United Nations General Assembly Resolutions with the prefix ES-11
