= Andrew Clapham =

British international lawyer

Andrew Clapham (born in Tunbridge Wells) is a British international lawyer specializing in human rights, international courts and tribunals and international humanitarian law. He has served in various advisory capacities at the United Nations.

== Background and personal life ==
Clapham is currently professor of public international law at the Graduate Institute of International and Development Studies, in Geneva, Switzerland. After undergraduate studies at the University of Cambridge, he wrote his Ph.D. at the European University Institute in Florence under the guidance of Antonio Cassese. He is an associate member of the Matrix Chambers.

He was among survivors of the Canal Hotel bombing in Iraq during which Sergio Vieira de Mello was killed with 20 other members of his staff on 19 August 2003.

== Work ==
Clapham has worked as special adviser on corporate responsibility to High Commissioner for Human Rights Mary Robinson, and adviser on international Humanitarian Law to Sergio Vieira de Mello, Special Representative of the UN Secretary-General in Iraq. He has also been the representative of human rights group Amnesty International to the United Nations between 1991 and 1994.

He was the first director of the Geneva Academy of International Humanitarian Law and Human Rights between 2008 and 2014.

In 2015, Clapham was among two international lawyers whose legal opinion Amnesty International commissioned to reach the conclusion that the United Kingdom was breaching the law by allowing the sales of weapons to Saudi Arabia despite knowing about their use to bomb civilians.

In 2017, he was appointed to serve as a member of the U.N. Commission on Human Rights in South Sudan, charged with monitoring and assessing the human rights situation in the country. He advises the government of Ukraine as part of the Task Force on Accountability for Crimes Committed in Ukraine, a group of lawyers investigating war crimes committed during the war with Russia.

His book, War (Oxford University Press), won the Paul Reuter Prize for International Humanitarian Law, which is awarded by the International Committee of the Red Cross. The 1949 Geneva Conventions: A Commentary (Oxford University Press; co-edited with Paola Gaeta, and Marco Sassòli) won a Certificate of Merit from the American Society of International Law for "a preeminent contribution to creative scholarship" in 2017.

Clapham is often cited in the news media for his expertise in relation to the United Nations' efforts to hold perpetrators of war crimes accountable and uphold human rights law.

== Publications ==
Representative publications include:

- War (Oxford, Oxford University Press) (2021) 624p
- The 1949 Geneva Conventions, A Commentary (Oxford, Oxford University Press) (2015) 1760p
- The Oxford Handbook of International Law in Armed Conflict, with Paola Gaeta, (Oxford, Oxford University Press) (2014) 1008p
- Brierly's Law of Nations: An Introduction to the Role of International Law in International Relations (Oxford, Oxford University Press) (2012) 576p
- "Corporations and Criminal Complicity‟ in Human Rights, Corporate Complicity and Disinvestment, G. Nystuen, A. Follesdal, and O. Mestad (eds) Cambridge, Cambridge University Press, (2011), 222-242.
- Realizing the Right to Health (Zurich: Rüffer and Rub) co-edited with Mary Robinson (2009) 576p
- Human Rights: A Very Short Introduction (Oxford, Oxford University Press) (2007) 140p
- Human Rights Obligations of Non-State Actors, (Oxford, Oxford University Press) (2006) 650p
- International Human Rights Lexicon, with Susan Marks, (Oxford, Oxford University Press) (2005) 460p
