= United Nations Security Council Resolution 2166 =

UN Security Council Resolution 2166
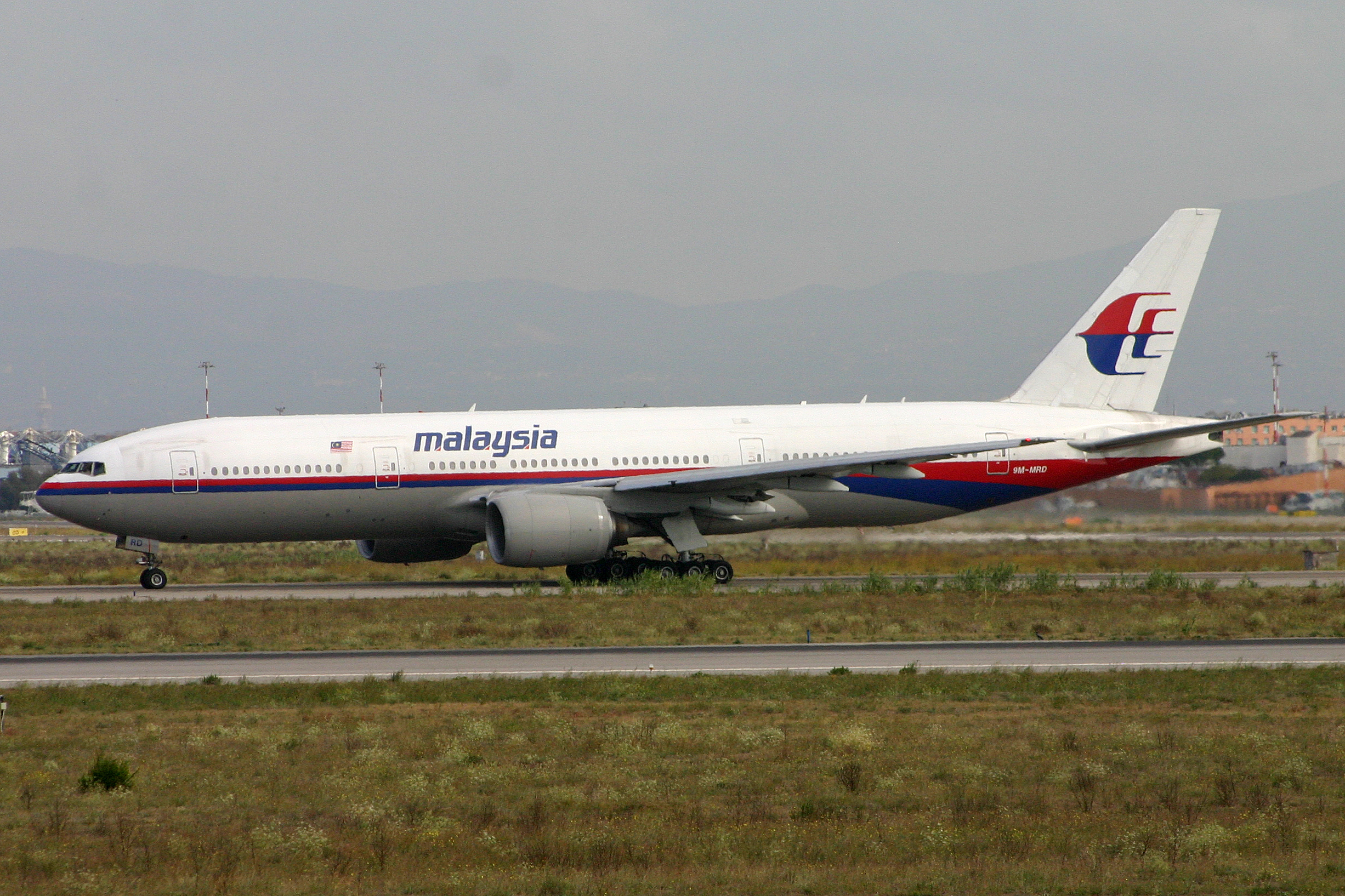
- Boeing 777 that was shot down, photographed in 2011
- Date: 21 July 2014
- Meeting no.: 7,221
- Code: S/RES/2166 (Document)
- Subject: Malaysia Airlines Flight 17
- Voting summary: 15 voted for; None voted against; None abstained
- Result: Adopted

Security Council composition
- Permanent members: China; France; Russia; United Kingdom; United States
- Non-permanent members: Argentina; Australia; Chad; Chile; Jordan; South Korea; Lithuania; Luxembourg; Nigeria; Rwanda

United Nations Security Council Resolution 2166, concerning the shootdown of Malaysia Airlines Flight 17, was sponsored by Australia and adopted unanimously on 21 July 2014. The resolution expressed support for the "efforts to establish a full, thorough and independent international investigation into the incident in accordance with international civil aviation guidelines" and called on all United Nations member states "to provide any requested assistance to civil and criminal investigations". It was the first among the UNSC-adopted resolutions concerning the Russo-Ukrainian War.

== Preparation ==
The resolution was drafted on 18 July, put into circulation on 19 July and agreed the next day. Russia, a permanent member with a veto right, supported the resolution after negotiations led to some text changes, including terming the incident as "downing" of the aircraft instead of "shooting down".

== See also ==
- United Nations Security Council Resolution 731
- United Nations Security Council Resolution 748
- List of United Nations Security Council Resolutions 2101 to 2200 (2013–2015)
- United Nations Security Council Resolution 2623 (2022)
- United Nations Security Council Resolution 2774 (2025)
