= United Nations General Assembly Resolution ES-11 =

United Nations General Assembly Resolution ES-11 may refer to any one of the following resolutions adopted during the eleventh emergency special session of the United Nations General Assembly:

- United Nations General Assembly Resolution ES-11/1, adopted 2 March 2022 deploring Russia's invasion of Ukraine
- United Nations General Assembly Resolution ES-11/2, adopted 24 March 2022, similar to the /1 resolution but also adds concerns for the civilian population of Ukraine
- United Nations General Assembly Resolution ES-11/3, adopted 7 April 2022 for suspending Russia's membership in the United Nations Human Rights Council
- United Nations General Assembly Resolution ES-11/4, adopted on 12 October 2022 calling referendums that Russia held in Ukrainian territories under its occupation as a sham
- United Nations General Assembly Resolution ES-11/5, adopted 14 November 2022 calling for Russia to pay war reparations to Ukraine
- United Nations General Assembly Resolution ES-11/6, adopted 23 February 2023 calling for a just and lasting peace in Ukraine
- United Nations General Assembly Resolution ES-11/7, adopted 24 February 2025, similar to the /6 resolution
- United Nations General Assembly Resolution ES-11/8, adopted 24 February 2025, also similar to the /6 resolution
