= United Nations General Assembly Resolution ES-11/5 =

UN General Assembly Resolution ES-11/5
In favour
Against
Abstained
Absent
Non-UN member
- Date: 14 November 2022
- Meeting no.: 11th Emergency Special Session (continued)
- Code: A/RES/ES-11/5 (Document)
- Subject: Furtherance of remedy and reparation for aggression against Ukraine
- Voting summary: 94 voted for; 13 voted against; 74 abstained; 12 absent
- Result: Resolution adopted

The United Nations General Assembly Resolution ES‑11/5 is the fifth resolution of the eleventh emergency special session of the United Nations General Assembly, adopted on 14 November 2022, calling for Russia to pay war reparations to Ukraine by creating an international reparations mechanism.

== Voting ==
Vote	Tally	States	Percent of votes	Percent of members
In favour	94	Afghanistan, Albania, Andorra, Argentina, Australia, Austria, Belgium, Benin, Bosnia and Herzegovina, Bulgaria, Canada, Cape Verde, Chad, Chile, Colombia, Comoros, Costa Rica, Côte d'Ivoire, Croatia, Cyprus, Czech Republic, Denmark, Djibouti, Dominican Republic, Ecuador, Estonia, Fiji, Finland, France, Georgia, Germany, Ghana, Greece, Guatemala, Hungary, Iceland, Ireland, Italy, Japan, Kenya, Kiribati, Kuwait, Latvia, Liberia, Liechtenstein, Lithuania, Luxembourg, Malawi, Maldives, Malta, Marshall Islands, Mexico, Micronesia, Moldova, Monaco, Montenegro, Myanmar, Nauru, Netherlands, New Zealand, Niger, North Macedonia, Norway, Palau, Panama, Papua New Guinea, Paraguay, Peru, Philippines, Poland, Portugal, Qatar, South Korea, Romania, Samoa, San Marino, Seychelles, Singapore, Slovakia, Slovenia, Solomon Islands, Somalia, Spain, Sweden, Switzerland, Togo, Turkey, Tuvalu, Ukraine, United Kingdom, United States, Uruguay, Vanuatu, Zambia	51.93%	48.70%
Against	14	Belarus, Central African Republic, China, Cuba, North Korea, Eritrea, Ethiopia, Iran, Mali, Nicaragua, Russian Federation, Syria, Zimbabwe	7.73%	7.25%
Abstain	73	Algeria, Angola, Antigua and Barbuda, Armenia, Bahamas, (Note: Minister of Foreign Affairs Fred Mitchell said in Parliament, "Unfortunately, due to an error, the vote of The Bahamas was recorded as 'no' when it should have been 'abstain'. We have a photograph of the board reflecting abstain, but when the vote closed, the vote recorded as no. It should have been abstain. We have taken the steps to seek to reflect properly what the record is, but we've been advised that in the system of the United Nations, it is not possible to change what is the recorded vote and the procedure is that you enter a statement which corrects the record which we have done. CARICOM strongly condemns the unilateral military incursion into Ukraine by the Russian Federation.") Bahrain, Bangladesh, Barbados, Belize, Bhutan, Bolivia, Botswana, Brazil, Brunei, Burundi, Cambodia, Congo, Egypt, El Salvador, Equatorial Guinea, Eswatini, Gabon, Gambia, Grenada, Guinea, Guinea-Bissau, Guyana, Haiti, Honduras, India, Indonesia, Iraq, Israel, Jamaica, Jordan, Kazakhstan, Kyrgyzstan, Laos, Lebanon, Lesotho, Libya, Madagascar, Malaysia, Mauritania, Mauritius, Mongolia, Mozambique, Namibia, Nepal, Nigeria, Oman, Pakistan, Rwanda, Saint Kitts and Nevis, Saint Lucia, Saint Vincent and the Grenadines, Saudi Arabia, Serbia, Sierra Leone, South Africa, South Sudan, Sri Lanka, Sudan, Suriname, Tajikistan, Thailand, Timor-Leste, Trinidad and Tobago, Tunisia, Uganda, United Arab Emirates, Uzbekistan, Vietnam, Yemen	40.33%	37.82%
Absent	12	Azerbaijan, Burkina Faso, Cameroon, Democratic Republic of the Congo, Dominica, Morocco, São Tomé and Príncipe, Senegal, Tonga, Tanzania, Turkmenistan, Venezuela (Note: Venezuela was suspended from voting in the 76th session and the 11th emergency special session owing to its failure to pay dues in the previous two years, for which it did not receive a special waiver from the Assembly.)	–	6.22%
Total	193	–	100%	100%
Source: A/ES-11/5 voting record

== See also ==
- Eleventh emergency special session of the United Nations General Assembly
- Legality of the Russian invasion of Ukraine
- United Nations General Assembly Resolution 68/262
- Other United Nations General Assembly Resolutions with the prefix ES-11
- United Nations General Assembly resolution
- United Nations Security Council Resolution 2623
