= United Nations Security Council Resolution 2623 =

2022 resolution for an emergency meeting on the Russian invasion of Ukraine

UN Security Council Resolution 2623
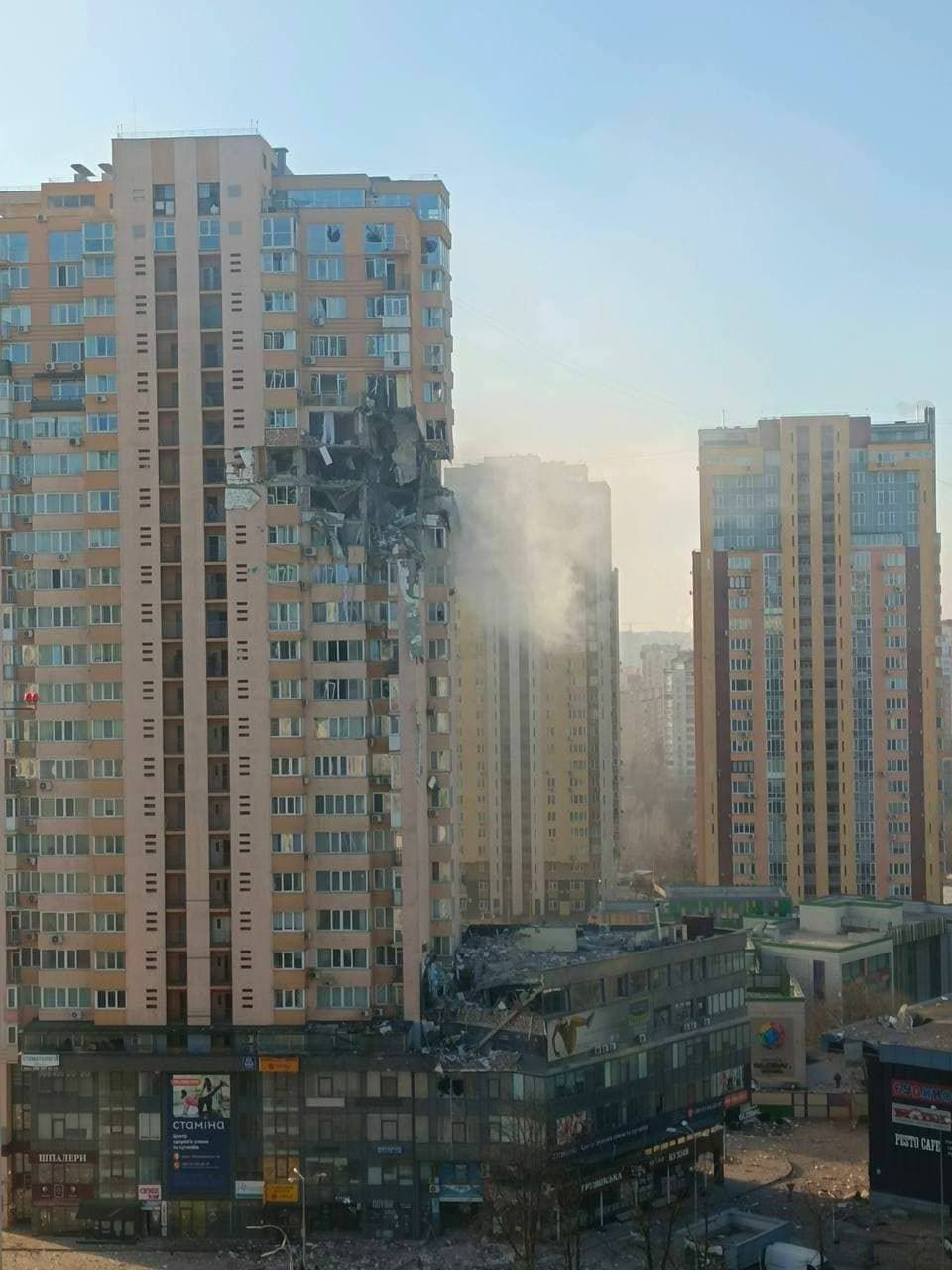
- Apartment block in Kyiv (Valeriy Lobanovskyi Avenue) struck by a missile, 26 February
- Date: 27 February 2022
- Meeting no.: 8,980
- Code: S/RES/2623 (Document)
- Subject: Maintenance of peace and security in Ukraine
- Voting summary: 11 voted for; 1 voted against; 3 abstained
- Result: Adopted

Security Council composition
- Permanent members: China; France; Russia; United Kingdom; United States
- Non-permanent members: Albania; Brazil; Gabon; Ghana; India; Ireland; Kenya; Mexico; Norway; United Arab Emirates

The United Nations Security Council Resolution 2623 called for the eleventh emergency special session of the United Nations General Assembly on the subject of the Russian invasion of Ukraine. Albania and the United States introduced the resolution before the United Nations Security Council, which adopted it on 27 February 2022. Russia voted against while China, India and the United Arab Emirates abstained. As this was a procedural resolution, no permanent member could exercise their veto power. The eleventh ESS has been 'adjourned' and 'resumed' on numerous occasions over the past several years, and remains temporarily adjourned. Indeed, more than twenty separate 'plenary meetings' have been held by the Assembly, whilst sitting in the eleventh ESS, since 2022.

== Basis ==
United Nations General Assembly Resolution 377, the "Uniting for Peace" resolution, adopted 3 November 1950, states that in any cases where the Security Council, because of a lack of unanimity among its five permanent members (P5), fails to act as required to maintain international peace and security, the General Assembly shall consider the matter immediately and may issue appropriate recommendations to UN members for collective measures, including the use of armed force when necessary, in order to maintain or restore international peace and security.

Resolution 2623 was the 13th time the Uniting for Peace resolution has been invoked to call an emergency session of the General Assembly, including the 8th such invocation by the Security Council.

== Result ==
The eleventh emergency special session of the UNGA convened several times and passed the following resolutions:

- Resolution ES-11/1 "Aggression against Ukraine", March 2, 2022, 141–5–35 (for–against–abstained)
- Resolution ES-11/2 "Humanitarian consequences of the aggression against Ukraine", March 24, 2022, 140–5–38
- Resolution ES-11/3 "Suspension of the rights of membership of the Russian Federation in the Human Rights Council", April 7, 2022, 93–24–58
- Resolution ES-11/4 "Territorial integrity of Ukraine: defending the principles of the Charter of the United Nations", 12 October, 2022, 143–5–35
- Resolution ES-11/5 "Furtherance of remedy and reparation for aggression against Ukraine", 14 November, 2022, 95–14–73
- Resolution ES-11/6 "Principles of the Charter of the United Nations underlying a comprehensive, just and lasting peace in Ukraine", 2 March, 2023, 141-7-32
- United Nations General Assembly Resolution ES-11/7, February 24, 2025
- United Nations General Assembly Resolution ES-11/8, February 24, 2025

== Voting ==
Voting took place both in the General Assembly and in the Security Council.

=== Security Council ===
There are 15 voting members present for the Security Council meeting that occurred on 27 February 2022. Eleven members approved, only one opposed, and three members abstained.

Approved (11)	Abstained (3)	Opposed (1)
Albania; Brazil; **France**; Gabon; Ghana; Ireland; Kenya; Mexico; Norway; **United Kingdom**; **United States**	**China**; India; United Arab Emirates	**Russia**

Permanent members of the Security Council are shown in bold.

The emergency special session was called as a result and met on 28 February 2022.

== See also ==
- Eleventh emergency special session of the United Nations General Assembly
- Legality of the Russian invasion of Ukraine
- United Nations Security Council Resolution 2166 (2014)
- List of United Nations Security Council Resolutions 2601 to 2700 (2021–2023)
- United Nations Security Council Resolution 2774 (2025)
