= United Nations General Assembly Resolution ES-11/3 =

2022 resolution suspending Russia from the United Nations Human Rights Council

UN General Assembly Resolution ES-11/3
In favour
Against
Abstained
Absent
Non-UN member
- Date: 7 April 2022
- Meeting no.: 11th Emergency Special Session (continued)
- Code: A/RES/ES-11/3 (Document)
- Subject: Suspension of the rights of membership of the Russian Federation in the Human Rights Council
- Voting summary: 93 voted for; 24 voted against; 58 abstained; 18 absent
- Result: Resolution adopted

The United Nations General Assembly Resolution ES‑11/3 is a resolution of the eleventh emergency special session of the United Nations General Assembly, adopted on 7 April 2022. The resolution suspended the membership of Russia in the United Nations Human Rights Council over "grave concern at the ongoing human rights and humanitarian crisis in Ukraine [...] including gross and systematic violations and abuses of human rights" committed by Russia, and was passed with 93 votes in favour, 24 against, and 58 abstentions.

== Background ==
On 1 April 2022, video footage of the Bucha massacre became public, linking the massacre to the Russian Armed Forces. On 4 April, citing the Bucha massacre, U.S. Permanent Representative to the United Nations Linda Thomas-Greenfield announced that the United States would seek the removal of Russia from the UN Human Rights Council. At the time, Russia was serving a three-year elected term on the council.

Draft resolution A/ES-11/L.4 was introduced on 6 April 2022. Previously, only Libya had its membership rights stripped from the body, as a result of the actions of the Gaddafi regime against anti-government protestors in 2011. Prior to the vote, the Russian delegation to the United Nations privately circulated a letter urging countries not to vote in favour or to abstain on the resolution, stressing that doing so would impact bilateral relations.

== Voting ==
On 7 April 2022, the UN General Assembly, which required a two-thirds majority, adopted the resolution with 93 votes in favour and 24 countries voting against. 58 countries abstained. With Russia's membership valid through 2023, the Russian delegation announced it had quit the Human Rights Council earlier that day in expectation of the vote.

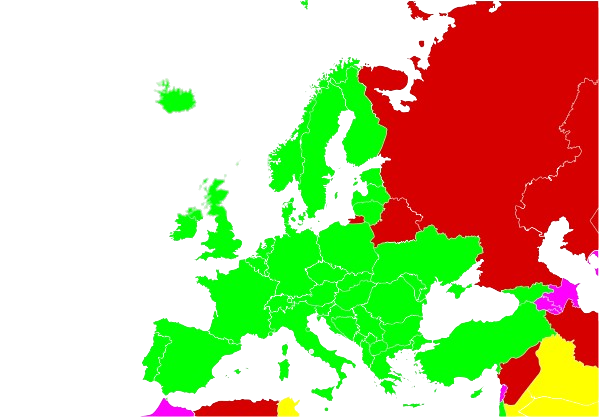
A map showing the vote for the United Nations General Assembly resolution ES-11/3 in Europe. In favour Against Abstained Absent Non-UN member

Voting on Resolution ES-11/3
Vote	Tally	States	Percent of votes	Percent of member states
Approve	93	Albania, Andorra, Antigua and Barbuda, Argentina, Australia, Austria, Bahamas, Belgium, Bosnia and Herzegovina, Bulgaria, Canada, Chad, Chile, Colombia, Comoros, Costa Rica, Côte d'Ivoire, Croatia, Cyprus, Czech Republic, Democratic Republic of the Congo, Denmark, Dominica, Dominican Republic, Ecuador, Estonia, Fiji, Finland, France, Georgia, Germany, Greece, Grenada, Guatemala, Haiti, Honduras, Hungary, Iceland, Ireland, Israel, Italy, Jamaica, Japan, Kiribati, Latvia, Liberia, Libya, Liechtenstein, Lithuania, Luxembourg, Malawi, Malta, Marshall Islands, Mauritius, Micronesia, Moldova, Monaco, Montenegro, Myanmar, (Note: Myanmar was represented in the United Nations by the National Unity Government of the Committee Representing Pyidaungsu Hluttaw which consist of officials who were ousted in the 2021 coup d'état.) Nauru, Netherlands, New Zealand, North Macedonia, Norway, Palau, Panama, Papua New Guinea, Paraguay, Peru, Philippines, Poland, Portugal, Romania, Saint Lucia, Samoa, San Marino, Serbia, Seychelles, Sierra Leone, Slovakia, Slovenia, South Korea, Spain, Sweden, Switzerland, Timor-Leste, Tonga, Turkey, Tuvalu, Ukraine, United Kingdom, United States, Uruguay	79.49%	48.19%
Against	24	Algeria, Belarus, Bolivia, Burundi, Central African Republic, China, Congo, Cuba, Eritrea, Ethiopia, Gabon, Iran, Kazakhstan, Kyrgyzstan, Laos, Mali, Nicaragua, North Korea, Russia, Syria, Tajikistan, Uzbekistan, Vietnam, Zimbabwe	20.51%	12.44%
Abstain	58	Angola, Bahrain, Bangladesh, Barbados, Belize, Bhutan, Botswana, Brazil, Brunei, Cabo Verde, Cambodia, Cameroon, Egypt, El Salvador, Eswatini, Gambia, Ghana, Guinea-Bissau, Guyana, India, Indonesia, Iraq, Jordan, Kenya, Kuwait, Lesotho, Madagascar, Malaysia, Maldives, Mexico, Mongolia, Mozambique, Namibia, Nepal, Niger, Nigeria, Oman, Pakistan, Qatar, Saint Kitts and Nevis, Saint Vincent and the Grenadines, Saudi Arabia, Senegal, Singapore, South Africa, South Sudan, Sri Lanka, Sudan, Suriname, Tanzania, Thailand, Togo, Trinidad and Tobago, Tunisia, Uganda, United Arab Emirates, Vanuatu, Yemen	–	30.05%
Absent	18	Afghanistan, Armenia, Azerbaijan, Benin, Burkina Faso, Djibouti, Equatorial Guinea, Guinea, Lebanon, Mauritania, Morocco, Rwanda, São Tomé and Príncipe, Solomon Islands, Somalia, Turkmenistan, Venezuela, (Note: Venezuela was suspended from voting in the 76th session and the 11th emergency special session owing to its failure to pay dues in the previous two years, for which it did not receive a special waiver from the Assembly.) Zambia	–	9.33%
Total	193	–	100%	100%
Source: A/RES/ES-11/3 voting record

== See also ==
- Eleventh emergency special session of the United Nations General Assembly
- Legality of the Russian invasion of Ukraine
- United Nations General Assembly Resolution 68/262
- Other United Nations General Assembly Resolutions with the prefix ES-11
- United Nations General Assembly Resolution A/RES/77/229
- United Nations General Assembly resolution
- United Nations Security Council Resolution 2623
