= United Nations Security Council Resolution 2774 =

2025 non-procedural resolution on Russo-Ukrainian war

UN Security Council Resolution 2774
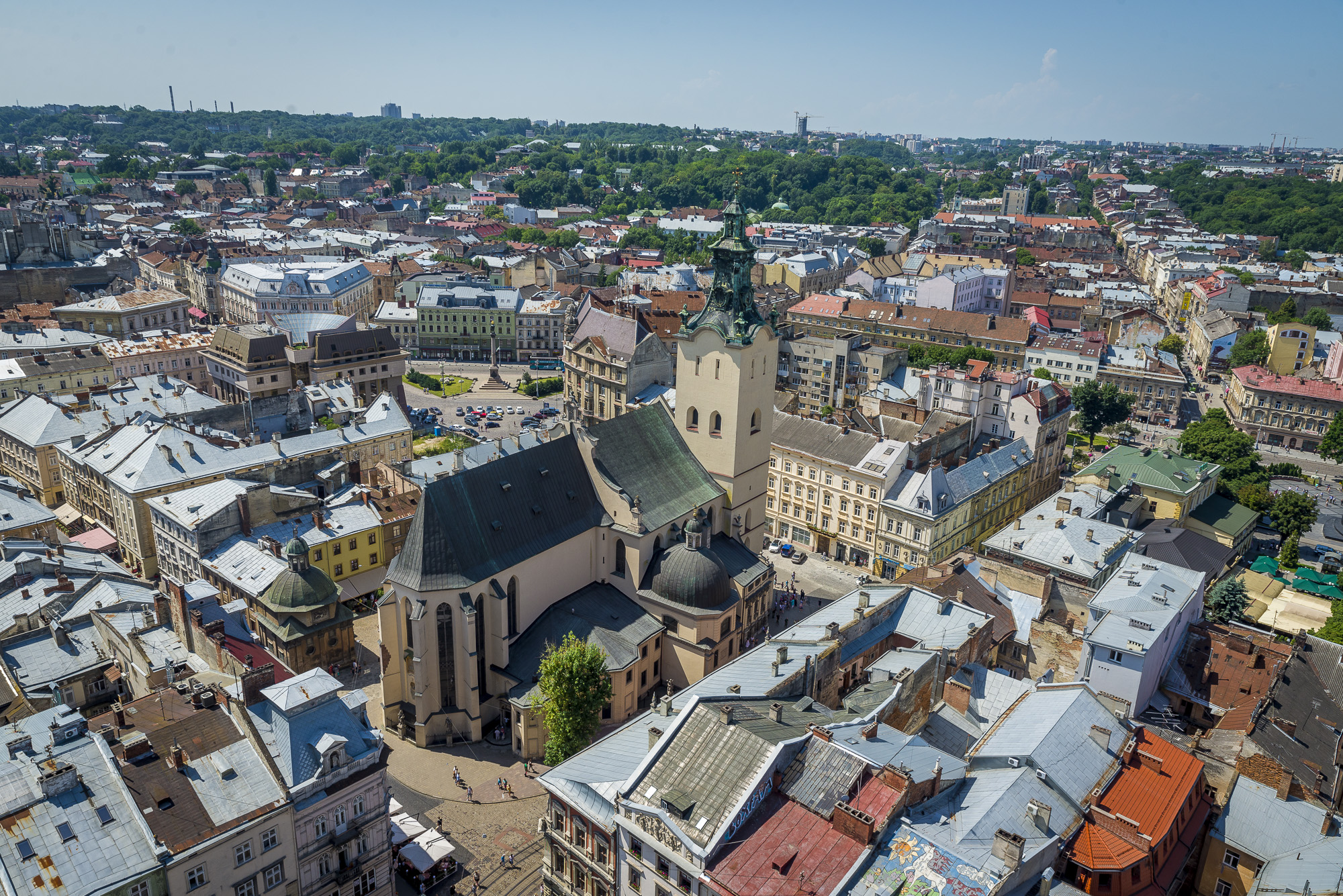
- Historic Centre of Lviv
- Date: 24 February 2025
- Meeting no.: 9,866
- Code: S/RES/2774 (Document)
- Subject: Maintenance of international peace and security in Ukraine
- Voting summary: 10 voted for; None voted against; 5 abstained
- Result: Adopted

Security Council composition
- Permanent members: China; France; Russia; United Kingdom; United States
- Non-permanent members: Algeria; Denmark; Greece; Guyana; South Korea; Pakistan; Panama; Sierra Leone; Slovenia; Somalia

The United Nations Security Council Resolution 2774 was adopted on 24 February 2025. This was the first non-procedural resolution on the ongoing Russian invasion of Ukraine that was passed, after several previous proposals met Russian opposition.

The Resolution was introduced by the United States and was able to pass due to an upturn in Russo-American relations after Donald Trump assumed office a month earlier. United States representative Dorothy Shea claimed that the goal of the resolution was simply to encourage an end the war; European states criticized it for lacking "criticism of Russia" or support for the territorial integrity of Ukraine. The adoption of this Resolution was a sign of deepening rift between the United States on one side and Ukraine and its European allies on the other side. The eleventh ESS — adopting similar text as amended by suggestions of European member states prior to UNSC vote the same day — has been 'adjourned' and 'resumed' on numerous occasions over the past several years, and remains temporarily adjourned. Indeed, more than twenty separate 'plenary meetings' have been held by the UNGA, whilst sitting in the eleventh ESS, since 2022.

The Resolution 2774 was approved with ten votes in favor, five abstentions (Denmark, France, Greece, Slovenia and the United Kingdom) and no vote against. It became the third among the UNSC-adopted resolutions concerning the Russo-Ukrainian War since 2014.

== Text ==
The Security Council,

Mourning the tragic loss of life through the Russian Federation-Ukraine conflict,

Reiterating that the principal purpose of the United Nations, as expressed in the Charter of the United Nations, is to maintain international peace and security and to peacefully settle disputes,

Implores a swift end to the conflict and further urges a lasting peace between Ukraine and the Russian Federation.

== Voting ==
Approved (10)	Abstained (5)	Opposed (0)
Algeria; China; Guyana; South Korea; Pakistan; Panama; Russia; Sierra Leone; Somalia; United States	Denmark; France; Greece; Slovenia; United Kingdom	

== See also ==
- List of United Nations Security Council Resolutions 2701 to 2800 (2023–2025)
- United Nations Security Council Resolution 2623 (2022)
- United Nations Security Council Resolution 2166 (2014)
