= Legality of the 2022 Russian invasion of Ukraine =

Since the beginning, the Russian invasion of Ukraine has been described as violating international law (including the Charter of the United Nations). (Note: Attributed to multiple references:) The invasion has also been called a crime of aggression under international criminal law, and under some countries' domestic criminal codes – including those of Ukraine and Russia – although procedural obstacles exist to prosecutions under these laws.

This article discusses the international and domestic legal provisions Russia is said to have violated, as well as the legal arguments Russia has made to justify its invasion and the responses of legal experts to those arguments. The legality of the Russian invasion per se is a distinct subject from whether individual political officials or combatants have engaged in war crimes or crimes against humanity.

== Background ==
=== Invasion of Crimea and Donbas (2014–2022) ===
In March 2014, Russia annexed Crimea from Ukraine. Around the same time, protests by pro-Russian separatist groups took place in the Donetsk and Luhansk oblasts of Ukraine, collectively called the Donbas. Russia took advantage of these protests to launch a coordinated political and military campaign against Ukraine. These events led to an ongoing military conflict between Russian-backed separatists and Ukrainian forces in the Donbas, during which the separatist-controlled areas were organized into two quasi-states: the Luhansk People's Republic and Donetsk People's Republic. These self-declared governments were not recognized by any governments other than that of Russia.

=== Russian military build-up (2021–2022) ===
Russia's invasion of Ukraine in 2022 was preceded by a massive military buildup. Russia began increasing its military presence near its border with Ukraine in March and April 2021. Although the Russian government repeatedly denied that it intended to invade Ukraine, the US government released intelligence of Russian invasion plans in December 2021, including satellite photographs showing Russian troops and equipment near the Ukrainian border. As these events unfolded, Russian officials accused Ukraine of inciting tensions, Russophobia, and repression of Russian speakers, while also making multiple security demands of Ukraine, NATO, and non-NATO EU allies.

On 21 February 2022, Russian President Vladimir Putin gave a televised speech questioning the legitimacy of Ukraine's statehood and indicating that he intended to immediately recognize the independence of Donetsk and Luhansk.

=== Start of and justifications for invasion (2022) ===
On Wednesday evening 23 February, Putin addressed his nation on television announcing a "special military operation" in Ukraine. Putin claimed that Russian military intervention in Ukraine was necessary to "protect people who have been subjected to abuse and genocide" by the Ukrainian government and to "protect Russia and our people". Putin also said that the Donetsk and Luhansk People's Republics—which the Russian government had formally recognized only two days before—had requested assistance in their fight against the Ukrainian government. The stated aims of Russia's "special military operation" included "the demilitarisation and denazification of Ukraine".

Scholars described Putin's allegations of genocide and comparison of Ukraine to a Nazi state as baseless.

Shortly after Putin's speech, the Ukrainian government reported airstrikes and artillery attacks in Kyiv, Kharkiv, and Dnipro, as well as on the border with Russia. Ukrainian President Volodymyr Zelenskyy declared martial law and called for a general mobilization. The conflict remains ongoing.

== International law and the responses at the United Nations ==
Russia has been a member of the United Nations (UN) since December 1991, when it took over the seat of the defunct Soviet Union. The 1945 UN Charter sets out the conditions under which UN member states may legally resort to war or the use of armed force in general (a concept referred to as jus ad bellum). The 2022 Russian invasion of Ukraine can be grasped as illegal precisely because it violated the Charter – arguably one of the most significant documents of international law.

=== Legality of Russia's use of force against Ukraine ===
Article 2(4) of the UN Charter provides that all members of the UN "shall refrain in their international relations from the threat or use of force against the territorial integrity or political independence of any state, or in any other manner inconsistent with the Purposes of the United Nations." Along similar lines, Article 2(3) of the Charter requires all member states to "settle their international disputes by peaceful means in such a manner that international peace and security, and justice, are not endangered." The only two exceptions enshrined in the UN Charter are self-defense and an authorization by the Security Council.

Many experts on international law and foreign affairs have opined that the Russian invasion of Ukraine violated these principles, namely Article 2(4)'s prohibition on the "use of force" against other states. (Note: Attributed to multiple references:) As detailed below, they have also generally rejected the Russian government's official legal justifications for the invasion of Ukraine.

==== Self-defense justification ====
Russia has argued that its use of force against Ukraine is lawful under Article 51 of the UN Charter, which preserves the rights of UN member states to defend themselves against "an armed attack" and to engage in "collective self-defense." Specifically, Russia has claimed that it may use force against Ukraine in order to defend the Donetsk People's Republic and the Luhansk People's Republic, which Russia recognized as independent states. International law and foreign policy experts such as John B. Bellinger III, Gabriella Blum, Naz Modirzadeh, and Anthony Dworkin have criticized this argument.

Bellinger and Dworkin argued that Russia cannot rely on a self-defense justification because Ukraine has not threatened or attacked any other nation. All four scholars have also opined that even if Ukraine had been planning an attack against Donetsk or Luhansk, Russia could not invoke Article 51's collective self-defense provision because these regions are not recognized as separate states under international law. Allen Weiner of Stanford Law School made a similar argument, likening Russia's collective self-defense arguments to a hypothetical situation where a modern entity calling itself the independent "Republic of Texas" invited a foreign government to send troops to fight against the United States.

==== Genocide/humanitarian intervention justification ====
Likewise, experts have rejected Russia's argument that its invasion is justified on humanitarian grounds to protect Russian-speakers in the Donbas. Some commentators have questioned whether international law (including the UN Charter and the Genocide Convention) even allows nations to use force against another country to remedy genocide or human rights violations, as the legality of humanitarian intervention is heavily disputed. The same goes for Russia's implicit reliance on the so-called protection of nationals doctrine which, even if accepted, only applies to situations of less intensity (like hostage-takings) and requires an actual threat, lack of cooperation by the government of the country where nationals are being threatened, and a minimum of force. In any event, Russia's humanitarian justifications for the invasion are widely perceived as a pretext, and are unsubstantiated by any evidence that Ukraine has committed, or is committing, any acts against Russians in Donetsk and Luhansk that could amount to genocide. (Note: Attributed to multiple references:)

==== Comparisons to Western interventions in other countries ====
Russia has also tried to justify its invasion of Ukraine by comparing its actions to interventions by the United States and its allies during conflicts such as the Kosovo War, the Iraq War, the Libyan Crisis, and the Syrian civil war. These comparisons have been dismissed as irrelevant because one illegal act does not make a different act legal. Professors Blum and Modirzadeh have remarked that "these arguments would carry little weight in any court of law" because "even if [they were] true, one illegal use of force does not justify another." Likewise, Professor Ingrid Wuerth has said that Russia's arguments go "nowhere in terms of a legal or moral justification for Russia's own actions," although she agrees with Russia "that other powerful countries have undermined international law's prohibition on the use of force and protections of territorial integrity."

The Associated Press (AP) has noted that NATO's intervention in Kosovo only occurred after significant evidence of the persecution of ethnic Albanians, whereas Russian forces have no such evidence of abuses by Ukraine. Additionally, "NATO didn’t occupy Kosovo after driving Serbian forces out of the former Serbian province, but sent in peacekeepers. Russian troops, meanwhile, took control of Crimea even before its referendum to join Russia was held." However, the AP also noted that both interventions began with false claims of the persecution of ethnic minorities in neighboring countries, and that ethnic Russians feared Ukrainian nationalists.

=== Responses at the UN Security Council ===
The Russians invaded early in the morning on Thursday 24 February. By Friday afternoon, the UN Security Council (UNSC) was in session on the issue. Russia vetoed the UNSC resolution that would have called for Russia to immediately cease its attack on Ukraine. China, India, and the United Arab Emirates abstained from the vote; the 11 remaining members of the UNSC voted in favor of the resolution.

On Sunday 27 February, United Nations Security Council Resolution 2623 was passed. As a procedural vote, it could not be vetoed. It called for the UN General Assembly (UNGA) to sit in an "emergency special session" (the 11th in the body's 75-year history) on the armed conflict.

On 24 February 2023 the 9269th meeting of the UNSC addressed the "[m]aintenance of peace and security of Ukraine" for over three hours.

=== Responses at the UN General Assembly ===
On Monday 28 February, a UNGA resolution condemning the Russian invasion was passed with an overwhelming 141–5 vote majority, with 35 nations abstaining.

Among other statements, the General Assembly resolution called upon Russia to abide by the UN Charter and the 1970 Declaration on Principles of International Law concerning Friendly Relations. The Declaration on Friendly Relations says that assisting a rebel group in another nation would threaten the target country's "territorial integrity," and that states have a duty to refrain from engaging in such actions.

UNGA resolutions chastising Russia for its invasion of Ukraine, or otherwise calling for an end to the conflict, include:

- United Nations General Assembly Resolution ES-11/1, 2 March 2022
- United Nations General Assembly Resolution ES-11/2, 24 March 2022
- United Nations General Assembly Resolution ES-11/3, 7 April 2022
- United Nations General Assembly Resolution ES-11/4, 12 October 2022
- United Nations General Assembly Resolution ES-11/5, 14 November 2022
- United Nations General Assembly Resolution ES-11/6, 23 February 2023
- United Nations General Assembly Resolution ES-11/7, 24 February 2025
- United Nations General Assembly Resolution ES-11/8, 24 February 2025
- United Nations General Assembly Resolution ES-11/9, 3 December 2025
- United Nations General Assembly Resolution ES-11/10, 24 February 2026

=== Responses at the UN Human Rights Council ===
On 4 March 2022, the UN Human Rights Council set up the Independent International Commission of Inquiry on Ukraine. The commission has a mandate to investigate violations of human rights and international humanitarian law during the invasion.

=== Responses at the Office of the High Commissioner for Human Rights ===
On 25 February 2022, Russia was accused by Amnesty International of war crimes and crimes against humanity, waging war in violation of international law, indiscriminately attacking densely populated areas, and exposing civilians to unnecessary and disproportionate harm. Human Rights Watch added its voice on 18 March. Finally, on 25 March 2022, the Office of the High Commissioner for Human Rights was forced to issue a statement.

== Violations of international agreements ==
The invasion of Ukraine also violated international agreements that Russia is a party to, including:

- The 1975 Helsinki Final Act, in which the USSR promised not to violate the "territorial integrity" of other signees, including through the use of force. Russia and Ukraine were both created as a result of the USSR's breakup.
- The 1994 Budapest Memorandum, in which Russia, the United States, and the United Kingdom agreed "to respect the independence and sovereignty and the existing borders of Ukraine."
- The Minsk agreements, which are a pair of Ceasefire Agreements signed by Russia and Ukraine relating to the conflict between those countries that began in 2014.

Additionally, Ukraine has accused Russia of violating the 1997 Treaty on Friendship, Cooperation, and Partnership – in which Russia and Ukraine agreed to respect each other's territorial integrity and existing borders – through its annexation of Crimea and actions in the Donbas. Ukraine terminated the treaty in December 2018, effective April 2019.

== Crime of aggression ==
Because it violates the UN Charter, and is more than a minor border incursion, Russia's military intervention in Ukraine was qualified by legal experts as a crime of aggression under Article 8bis(1) of the Rome Statute, which is defined as "an act of aggression which, by its character, gravity and scale, constitutes a manifest violation of the Charter of the United Nations." Among other acts, an "act of aggression" includes the "invasion or attack by the armed forces of a State of the territory of another State, or any military occupation, however temporary, resulting from such invasion or attack, or any annexation by the use of force of the territory of another State."

There exist procedural obstacles to holding Russian officials accountable for committing crimes of aggression against Ukraine.

In July 2023, Eurojust established the International Centre for the Prosecution of the Crime of Aggression (ICPA) to coordinate legal actions in relation to investigations and possible prosecutions for the Russian invasion as a crime of aggression, and as a possible step towards establishing a tribunal.

=== Proof requirements ===
According to legal scholar Kevin Jon Heller, establishing the crime of aggression would require two main elements: evidence of a state act of aggression and evidence showing that individuals held criminal responsibility. Heller saw the first element as easy to establish. He said that the second element would be a lot more difficult to establish. It would require showing that a suspect held a position of responsibility in which he or she "could directly control the military or political decisions of the state" and showing that a group of people actually planned or carried out those decisions as part of the act of aggression.

== Domestic criminal codes ==
Some commentators noted that in addition to violating international law, the invasion of Ukraine violated some countries' domestic criminal codes, including those of Russia, Ukraine, Belarus, and Poland. For example, Article 353 of the Russian Criminal Code prohibits planning, preparing, unleashing, or waging an aggressive war. The criminal codes of Ukraine (article 437), Belarus (article 122), and Poland (article 117) have similar prohibitions. Any country seeking to begin a prosecution under its national laws would need to either have territorial jurisdiction over crimes arising out of the invasion of Ukraine or allow for universal jurisdiction. State immunity doctrines would be another obstacle to prosecution.

Under international criminal law's principle of universal jurisdiction, investigations were opened in Estonia, Germany, Lithuania, Poland, Slovakia, Spain, Sweden, and Switzerland.

== Responses at the International Court of Justice ==
In late February 2022 Ukraine sued Russia in the International Court of Justice (ICJ), invoking jurisdiction under Article IX of the Genocide Convention. The lawsuit rejected Russia's claims that Ukraine was engaging in a genocide in Donbas and requested a court order requiring Russia to immediately halt its military operations in Ukraine. It also accuses Russia of "engag[ing] in a military invasion of Ukraine involving grave and widespread violations of the human rights of the Ukrainian people." Ukraine is represented by the law firm Covington & Burling in the lawsuit.

Russia boycotted an initial hearing held in the case on 7 March 2022, and later said it did not send anyone to attend because of the "absurdity" of Ukraine's lawsuit. The ICJ indicated that it would decide Ukraine's application for an emergency order calling for a halt to hostilities "as soon as possible."

On 16 March 2022, the court ruled that Russia must "immediately suspend the military operations that it commenced on 24 February 2022 in the territory of Ukraine." The court split 13–2 in the decision, with Judges Kirill Gevorgian of Russia and Xue Hanqin of China dissenting. Ukrainian President Volodymyr Zelenskyy hailed the ruling as a complete victory for his country, saying that Russia would be further isolated if it ignored the order.

On 2 February 2024, the court ruled that it lacked jurisdiction over Ukraine's requests to declare Russia's actions unlawful under the Genocide Convention. However, it also ruled that it did have jurisdiction over Ukraine's request for the court to rule that it was not committing genocide against ethnic Russians in the Donetsk and Luhansk oblasts of Ukraine, as claimed by Russia as a justification for its invasion. The court emphasized that its jurisdictional decision had nothing to do with whether Russia had violated international law, writing:

The Court recalls, as it has on several occasions in the past, that there is a fundamental distinction between the question of the acceptance by States of the Court’s jurisdiction and the conformity of their acts with international law. States are always required to fulfil their obligations under the Charter of the United Nations and other rules of international law. Whether or not they have consented to the jurisdiction of the Court, States remain responsible for acts attributable to them that are contrary to international law[.]

Despite this partial victory for Russia, the leader of Ukraine's legal team welcomed the chance to prove "that Ukraine is not responsible for some mythical genocide."

== Responses at the International Criminal Court ==
The Rome Statute created the International Criminal Court (ICC) and (in its current form) empowers it to prosecute genocide, war crimes, crimes against humanity, and crimes of aggression. Ukraine did not ratify the statute but signed two declarations accepting ICC jurisdiction in 2013 and 2014. Russia withdrew from the statute in 2016, and does not recognize ICC authority, but thirty-nine member states officially referred the Russia-Ukraine matter to the ICC.

On 28 February 2022 the International Criminal Court (ICC) announced its intent to investigate alleged war crimes and crimes against humanity taking place in Ukraine since 21 November 2013. A formal ICC investigation began on 2 March, when Karim Ahmad Khan, prosecutor for the ICC, opened a full investigation into past and present allegations of war crimes, crimes against humanity, and genocide in Ukraine by any person from 21 November 2013 on. Crimes of aggression are not included in the investigation.

ICC prosecutors normally have to go through an approval process to begin an investigation—a process that can take months— but the Ukraine investigation was fast-tracked after the unprecedented thirty-nine requests by ICC member states to begin the proceedings.

The ICC also set up an online portal for people with evidence to contact investigators, and sent investigators, lawyers and other professionals to Ukraine to collect evidence.

=== Obstacles to prosecuting the crime of aggression ===
There are at least two procedural obstacles to putting Russian political or military leaders on trial for crimes of aggression. First, the ICC does not try defendants in absentia, which means that a way must be found to bring leaders accused of crimes to The Hague.

Second, unlike the other crimes over which the ICC has jurisdiction, crimes of aggression can only be prosecuted against leaders from states that are members of the ICC unless the UN Security Council (UNSC) makes a referral. Russia is not an ICC member and has the permanent power to veto UNSC resolutions. Article 15bis(5) of the Rome Statute states that "'the [ICC] shall not exercise its jurisdiction over the crime of aggression when committed by [the] nationals or on [the] territory' of a state not party to the Statute". Neither Russia nor Ukraine is a party of the Rome Statute, although Ukraine accepted the ICC's jurisdiction ad hoc under Article 12(3). Although it is possible for the UNSC to overcome this jurisdictional hurdle by referring the case to the ICC, a referral is highly unlikely given Russia's permanent veto power over UNSC resolutions and its support from China, which is also a permanent member of the council.

The jurisdictional barrier to ICC prosecution for other crimes — genocide, war crimes, and crimes against humanity — can be overcome, if member countries refer the matter to the tribunal, but not in the case of crimes of aggression.

=== Potential solutions ===
One way to circumvent the ICC's jurisdictional limitations might be to constitute a special international tribunal to deal specifically with crimes of aggression against Ukraine, although some have questioned the utility of such a tribunal. Another alternative that would overcome both limitations discussed here would be to put leaders on trial in the domestic court systems of the approximately 20 countries that allow both universal jurisdiction over crimes of aggression and trials in absentia. However, trials in absentia raise important due process concerns that would have to be addressed.

== See also ==
- Accusation in a mirror § Russo-Ukrainian War
- International Criminal Tribunal for the Russian Federation – Ad hoc tribunal created in 2025
- Legality of the Iraq War – 21st century international controversy
- Reactions to the Russian invasion of Ukraine
- Task Force on Accountability for Crimes Committed in Ukraine – Unpaid international group of lawyers
- War and environmental law
- War crimes in the Russian invasion of Ukraine
