= Eleventh emergency special session of the United Nations General Assembly =

2022 ongoing session of the United Nations General Assembly

- ongoing since 28 Feb 2022
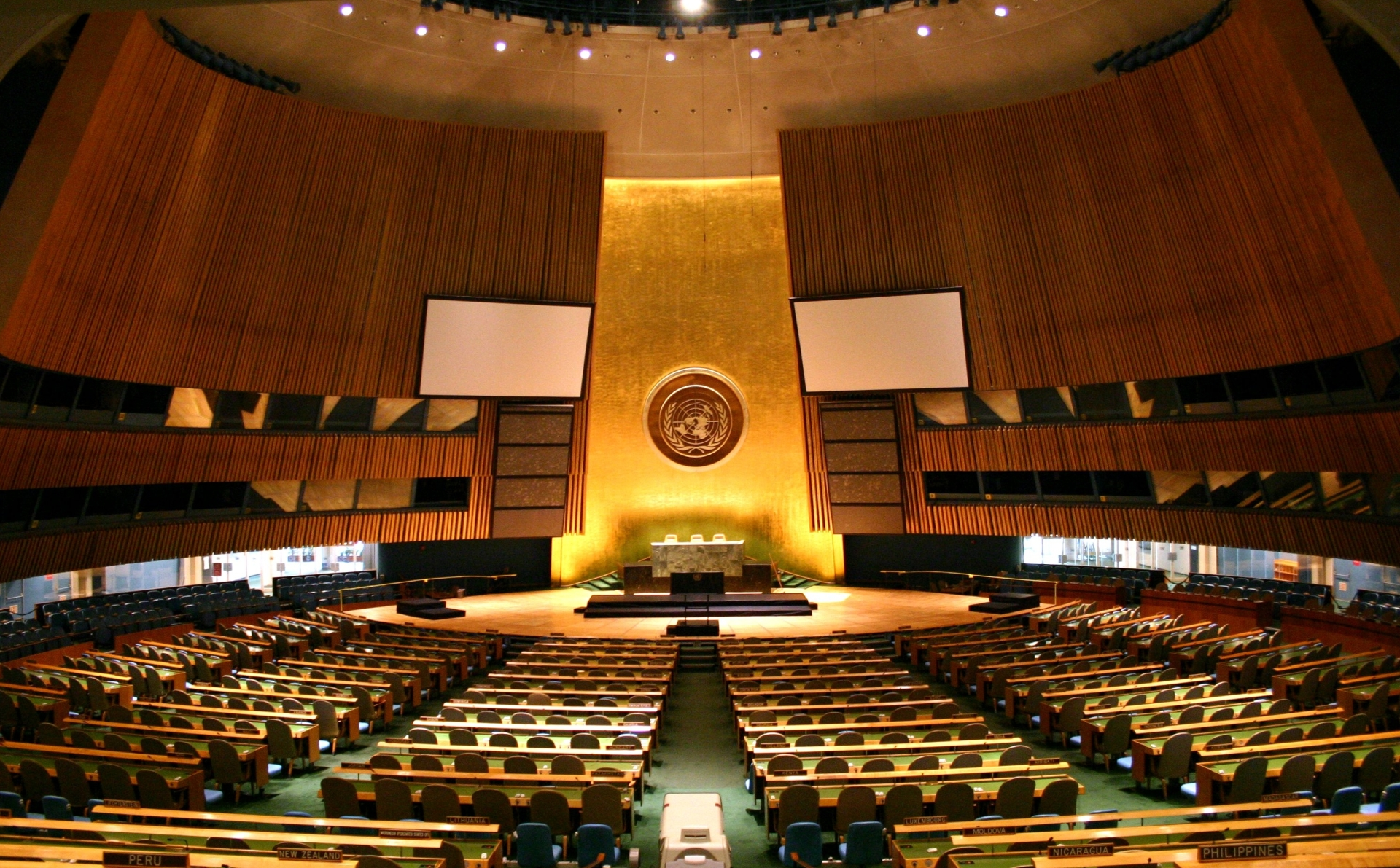
- General Assembly Hall (2006)
- Cities: New York City, New York, U.S.
- Venues: General Assembly Hall at the United Nations headquarters
- Participants: United Nations Member States
- Secretary: António Guterres
- Website: un.org/en/ga/sessions/emergency11th

A plenary meeting of the eleventh emergency special session of the United Nations General Assembly opened on 28 February 2022 at the United Nations headquarters. Called by the United Nations Security Council Resolution 2623, adopted on February 27, it addresses the Russian invasion of Ukraine. Maldivian politician Abdulla Shahid served as President of the body during this time.

The session was temporarily adjourned on 2 March following the adoption of Resolution ES-11/1 entitled "Aggression against Ukraine", which deplored the invasion and demanded a full withdrawal of Russian forces from Ukraine.

It reconvened on 23 and 24 March to adopt Resolution ES-11/2, which reiterated the exhortations made in Resolution ES-11/1 and called for the full protection of civilians, including humanitarian personnel, journalists and vulnerable persons.

It reconvened again on 7 April to adopt Resolution ES-11/3, which suspended Russia's membership of the United Nations Human Rights Council.

On 13 September the President of the 77th United Nations General Assembly, Csaba Kőrösi, took the chair at the Assembly. On 10 to 12 October the eleventh emergency special session of the United Nations General Assembly reconvened once again to adopt Resolution ES-11/4, declaring that Russia's staged referendums and subsequent attempted annexation of four Ukrainian regions have no validity under international law.

A request to resume the session was made on 7 November 2022 for the "Furtherance of remedy and reparation for aggression against Ukraine". There were two drafts for a Resolution: ES-11/5, and ES-11/6. Finally, Resolution ES-11/5 was adopted on 14 November 2022.

The eleventh emergency special session of the United Nations General Assembly was reconvened on 22 February 2023. The petitioners introduced draft resolution ES-11/L.7. The petitioners requested, that the Russian Federation withdraws all military forces from Ukraine and, that Ukraine retains the internationally recognised borders. Two subsidiary amendments by Belarus were mooted. The resolution passed as Resolution ES-11/6 by a margin of 141 in favour, 7 against and 32 abstentions including Iran and China. Russia attracted to its argument such nations as North Korea, Ba'athist Syria and Belarus.

The session was reconvened on 24 February 2025, with the 20th and 21st plenary meetings adopting United Nations General Assembly Resolution ES-11/7 and Resolution ES-11/8. The eleventh emergency special session has been adjourned and resumed on numerous occasions over the past several years, and remains temporarily adjourned. Indeed, more than twenty separate plenary meetings have been held by the Assembly, whilst sitting in the eleventh ESS, since 2022.

== Background ==
An emergency special session is an unscheduled meeting of the United Nations General Assembly to make urgent, but non-binding decisions or recommendations regarding a particular issue. Emergency special sessions are rare, having been convened only eleven times in the history of the United Nations.

The mechanism of the emergency special session was created in 1950 by the General Assembly's adoption of its "Uniting for Peace" resolution, which made the necessary changes to the Assembly's Rules of Procedure. The resolution likewise declared that:

... if the Security Council, because of lack of unanimity of the permanent members, fails to exercise its primary responsibility for the maintenance of international peace and security in any case where there appears to be a threat to the peace, breach of the peace, or act of aggression, the General Assembly shall consider the matter immediately with a view to making appropriate recommendations to Members for collective measures, including in the case of a breach of the peace or act of aggression the use of armed force when necessary, to maintain or restore international peace and security. If not in session at the time, the General Assembly may meet in emergency special session within twenty-four hours of the request therefor. Such emergency special session shall be called if requested by the Security Council on the vote of any seven members, or by a majority of the Members of the United Nations...

These conditions were deemed to have been met following the Russian Federation's use of its veto power within the United Nations Security Council on 25 February to defeat draft resolution S/2022/155 deploring the invasion and calling for the withdrawal of Russian troops.

== Convocation ==
At the UN Security Council, Albania co-sponsored a resolution with the United States for an emergency General Assembly session to be held regarding the invasion of Ukraine. On 27 February 2022, the United Nations Security Council adopted Resolution 2623 (2022), calling for an emergency special session to examine the matter of the Russian invasion of Ukraine. Eleven members of the Security Council voted in favour, with Russia voting against and China, India, and the United Arab Emirates abstaining. The resolution was passed despite Russia's negative vote because permanent members of the Security Council do not have veto power over procedural matters, such as a vote to convene an emergency special session.

Prior to Resolution 2623, the Uniting for Peace resolution had been invoked to call emergency sessions of the General Assembly on 12 occasions: seven times by the Security Council and five times by the General Assembly.

Voting on Resolution 2623
In favour (11)	Against (1)	Abstentions (3)
Albania, Brazil, **France**, Gabon, Ghana, Ireland, Kenya, Mexico, Norway, **United Kingdom**, **United States**	**Russian Federation**	**China**, India, United Arab Emirates
Result: Passed
Permanent members of the Security Council are shown in **bold**. Source: United Nations Meetings Coverage and Press Releases: SC/14809

== Proceedings ==
Resolution ES-11/1 vote In favour: 141 Against: 5 Abstained: 35 Absent: 12 Non-member

=== 28 February – 2 March 2022 ===
At the start of the special session on 28 February 2022, General Assembly President Abdulla Shahid of the Republic of Maldives called for the delegations to observe a minute's silence.

Russia defended its military operation in Ukraine, and blamed the violence on the Ukrainian government. Ukraine's representative to the UN, Sergiy Kyslytsya, condemned Russia's acts as "war crimes" and called Putin's decision to increase the nuclear readiness "madness". He warned, "If Ukraine does not survive, international peace will not survive. If Ukraine does not survive, the United Nations will not survive. ... If Ukraine does not survive, we cannot be surprised if democracy fails."

Around a hundred delegations lodged requests to address the assembly. On 2 March, the meeting adopted – by a vote of 141 to 5, with 35 abstentions – a non-binding resolution reaffirming its commitment to the sovereignty, independence, unity and territorial integrity of Ukraine, deploring Russia's aggression and Belarus's involvement in it, and demanding the immediate, complete and unconditional withdrawal of all Russian military forces from the territory of Ukraine. It also resolved to temporarily adjourn the emergency special session, authorizing the General Assembly President to resume its meetings upon request from member states.

Voting on Resolution ES-11/1
Vote	Tally	States	Percent of votes	Percent of members
In favour	141	Afghanistan, Albania, Andorra, Antigua and Barbuda, Argentina, Australia, Austria, Bahamas, Bahrain, Barbados, Belgium, Belize, Benin, Bhutan, Bosnia-Herzegovina, Botswana, Brazil, Brunei, Bulgaria, Cambodia, Canada, Cape Verde, Chad, Chile, Colombia, Comoros, Costa Rica, Côte d'Ivoire, Croatia, Cyprus, Czech Republic, Democratic Republic of the Congo, Denmark, Djibouti, Dominica, Dominican Republic, Ecuador, Egypt, Estonia, Fiji, Finland, France, Gabon, Gambia, Georgia, Germany, Ghana, Greece, Grenada, Guatemala, Guyana, Haiti, Honduras, Hungary, Iceland, Indonesia, Ireland, Israel, Italy, Jamaica, Japan, Jordan, Kenya, Kiribati, Kuwait, Latvia, Lebanon, Lesotho, Liberia, Libya, Liechtenstein, Lithuania, Luxembourg, Malawi, Malaysia, Maldives, Malta, Marshall Islands, Mauritania, Mauritius, Mexico, Micronesia, Moldova, Monaco, Montenegro, Myanmar, Nauru, Nepal, Netherlands, New Zealand, Niger, Nigeria, North Macedonia, Norway, Oman, Palau, Panama, Papua New Guinea, Paraguay, Peru, Philippines, Poland, Portugal, Qatar, Republic of Korea, Romania, Rwanda, Saint Kitts and Nevis, Saint Lucia, Saint Vincent and Grenadines, Samoa, San Marino, São Tomé and Príncipe, Saudi Arabia, Serbia, Seychelles, Sierra Leone, Singapore, Slovakia, Slovenia, Solomon Islands, Somalia, Spain, Suriname, Sweden, Switzerland, Thailand, Timor-Leste, Tonga, Trinidad and Tobago, Tunisia, Turkey, Tuvalu, Ukraine, United Arab Emirates, United Kingdom, United States, Uruguay, Vanuatu, Yemen, Zambia	96.58%	73.06%
Against	5	Belarus, Eritrea, North Korea, Russia, Syria	3.42%	2.59%
Abstain	35	Algeria, Angola, Armenia, Bangladesh, Bolivia, Burundi, Central African Republic, China, Cuba, El Salvador, Equatorial Guinea, India, Iran, Iraq, Kazakhstan, Kyrgyzstan, Laos, Madagascar, Mali, Mongolia, Mozambique, Namibia, Nicaragua, Pakistan, Republic of the Congo, Senegal, South Africa, South Sudan, Sri Lanka, Sudan, Tajikistan, Tanzania, Uganda, Vietnam, Zimbabwe	–	18.13%
Absent	12	Azerbaijan, Burkina Faso, Cameroon, Ethiopia, Eswatini, Guinea, Guinea-Bissau, Morocco, Togo, Turkmenistan, Uzbekistan, Venezuela (Note: Venezuela was suspended from voting in the 76th session and the 11th emergency special session owing to its failure to pay dues in the previous two years, for which it did not receive a special waiver from the Assembly.)	–	6.18%
Total	193	–	100%	100%
Source: A/RES/ES-11/1 voting record

=== 23–24 March 2022 ===
Resolution ES-11/2 vote In favour: 140 Against: 5 Abstained: 38 Absent: 10 Non-member

On 23 March, the session was continued and two more competing resolutions were introduced. Ukraine introduced the resolution "Humanitarian consequences of the aggression against Ukraine" (A/ES-11/2) and South Africa introduced the resolution "Humanitarian situation emanating out of the conflict in Ukraine" (A/ES-11/3). On 24 March, resolution A/ES-11/2 received 140 votes in favour and 5 against, with 38 countries abstaining.

Resolution ES-11/2 reaffirmed the member states' existing commitments and obligations under the United Nations Charter and reiterated the General Assembly's demand that Russia withdraw from Ukraine's recognized sovereign territory; it also deplored, expressed grave concern over and condemned attacks on civilian populations and infrastructure. Fourteen principles were agreed. Briefly, the principles demanded the full implementation of Resolution ES-11/1, immediate cessation of the hostilities by the Russian Federation against Ukraine, full protection of civilians – including humanitarian personnel, journalists and persons in vulnerable situations – and encouraged "continued negotiation".

Voting on Resolution ES-11/2
Vote	Tally	States	Percent of votes	Percent of members
In favour	140	Afghanistan, Albania, Andorra, Antigua and Barbuda, Argentina, Australia, Austria, Bahamas, Bahrain, Bangladesh, Barbados, Belgium, Belize, Benin, Bhutan, Bosnia-Herzegovina, Brazil, Bulgaria, Cambodia, Canada, Cape Verde, Chad, Chile, Colombia, Costa Rica, Côte d'Ivoire, Croatia, Cyprus, Czech Republic, Democratic Republic of the Congo, Denmark, Djibouti, Dominican Republic, Ecuador, Egypt, Estonia, Fiji, Finland, France, Gabon, Gambia, Georgia, Germany, Ghana, Greece, Grenada, Guatemala, Guyana, Haiti, Honduras, Hungary, Iceland, Indonesia, Iraq, Ireland, Israel, Italy, Jamaica, Japan, Jordan, Kenya, Kiribati, Kuwait, Latvia, Lebanon, Lesotho, Liberia, Libya, Liechtenstein, Lithuania, Luxembourg, Malawi, Malaysia, Maldives, Malta, Marshall Islands, Mauritania, Mauritius, Mexico, Micronesia, Moldova, Monaco, Montenegro, Myanmar, Nauru, Nepal, Netherlands, New Zealand, Niger, Nigeria, North Macedonia, Norway, Oman, Palau, Panama, Papua New Guinea, Paraguay, Peru, Philippines, Poland, Portugal, Qatar, Republic of Korea, Romania, Rwanda, Saint Kitts and Nevis, Saint Lucia, Saint Vincent and Grenadines, Samoa, San Marino, São Tomé and Príncipe, Saudi Arabia, Senegal, Serbia, Seychelles, Sierra Leone, Singapore, Slovakia, Slovenia, Solomon Islands, South Sudan, Spain, Suriname, Sweden, Switzerland, Thailand, Timor-Leste, Tonga, Trinidad and Tobago, Tunisia, Turkey, Tuvalu, Ukraine, United Arab Emirates, United Kingdom, United States, Uruguay, Vanuatu, Yemen, Zambia	96.55%	72.53%
Against	5	Belarus, Eritrea, North Korea, Russia, Syria	3.45%	2.59%
Abstain	38	Algeria, Angola, Armenia, Bolivia, Botswana, Brunei, Burundi, Central African Republic, China, Cuba, El Salvador, Equatorial Guinea, Eswatini, Ethiopia, Guinea-Bissau, India, Iran, Kazakhstan, Kyrgyzstan, Laos, Madagascar, Mali, Mongolia, Mozambique, Namibia, Nicaragua, Pakistan, Republic of the Congo, South Africa, Sri Lanka, Sudan, Tajikistan, Togo, Tanzania, Uganda, Uzbekistan, Vietnam, Zimbabwe	–	19.68%
Absent	10	Azerbaijan, Burkina Faso, Cameroon, Comoros, Dominica, Guinea, Morocco, Somalia, Turkmenistan, Venezuela (Note: Venezuela was suspended from voting in the 76th session and the 11th emergency special session owing to its failure to pay dues in the previous two years, for which it did not receive a special waiver from the Assembly.)	–	5.18%
Total	193	–	100%	100%
Source: A/RES/ES-11/2 voting record

=== 7 April 2022 ===
Resolution ES-11/3 vote In favour: 93 Against: 24 Abstained: 58 Absent: 18 Non-member

The emergency special session reconvened on 7 April to discuss a resolution co-sponsored by 53 delegations to suspend Russia's membership of the United Nations Human Rights Council on account of reported "violations and abuses of human rights and violations of international humanitarian law by the Russian Federation, including gross and systematic violations and abuses of human rights".

In introducing the draft resolution, Sergiy Kyslytsya, Permanent Representative of Ukraine, reminded the Assembly of the UN's failure to take determined action to prevent the Rwandan genocide in 1994, a tragedy the UN commemorates every year on 7 April. He drew a parallel between Rwanda's presence as a non-permanent member of the Security Council at the time and Russia's permanent Security Council seat: the former had enabled Rwanda's "genocidal regime" to influence other members with its perspective on the situation, while the latter allowed Russia "to spread lies almost daily". Those delegations planning to abstain in the vote, he said, would be showing the same indifference that failed to prevent genocide in Rwanda.

In response, Gennady Kuzmin, Russia's deputy permanent representative with responsibility for human rights issues, denounced the draft as an attempt by the United States to maintain its dominant position and to exert human rights colonialism, and he warned that his country's exclusion from the Human Rights Council could set a dangerous precedent. Addressing the allegations of abuses levelled at the Russian military, he said they were based on "staged events and widely circulated fakes".

The resolution was adopted by 93 votes to 24, with 58 abstentions. This was only the second occasion on which a state's membership in the council had been suspended, following the case of Libya in 2011 during the overthrow of Muammar Gaddafi. Speaking after the meeting, Kuzmin described the resolution as an "illegitimate and politically motivated step" and said that Russia had already withdrawn from the Council prior to the General Assembly vote.

Voting on Resolution ES-11/3
Vote	Tally	States	Percent of votes	Percent of member states
In favour	93	Albania, Andorra, Antigua and Barbuda, Argentina, Australia, Austria, Bahamas, Belgium, Bosnia-Herzegovina, Bulgaria, Canada, Chad, Chile, Colombia, Comoros, Costa Rica, Côte d'Ivoire, Croatia, Cyprus, Czech Republic, Democratic Republic of the Congo, Denmark, Dominica, Dominican Republic, Ecuador, Estonia, Fiji, Finland, France, Georgia, Germany, Greece, Grenada, Guatemala, Haiti, Honduras, Hungary, Iceland, Ireland, Israel, Italy, Jamaica, Japan, Kiribati, Latvia, Liberia, Libya, Liechtenstein, Lithuania, Luxembourg, Malawi, Malta, Marshall Islands, Mauritius, Micronesia, Moldova, Monaco, Montenegro, Myanmar, Nauru, Netherlands, New Zealand, North Macedonia, Norway, Palau, Panama, Papua New Guinea, Paraguay, Peru, Philippines, Poland, Portugal, Republic of Korea, Romania, Saint Lucia, Samoa, San Marino, Serbia, Seychelles, Sierra Leone, Slovakia, Slovenia, Spain, Sweden, Switzerland, Timor-Leste, Tonga, Turkey, Tuvalu, Ukraine, United Kingdom, United States, Uruguay	79.49%	48.19%
Against	24	Algeria, Belarus, Bolivia, Burundi, Central African Republic, China, Congo, Cuba, Eritrea, Ethiopia, Gabon, Iran, Kazakhstan, Kyrgyzstan, Laos, Mali, Nicaragua, North Korea, Russia, Syria, Tajikistan, Uzbekistan, Vietnam, Zimbabwe	20.51%	12.44%
Abstain	58	Angola, Bahrain, Bangladesh, Barbados, Belize, Bhutan, Botswana, Brazil, Brunei, Cabo Verde, Cambodia, Cameroon, Egypt, El Salvador, Eswatini, Gambia, Ghana, Guinea-Bissau, Guyana, India, Indonesia, Iraq, Jordan, Kenya, Kuwait, Lesotho, Madagascar, Malaysia, Maldives, Mexico, Mongolia, Mozambique, Namibia, Nepal, Niger, Nigeria, Oman, Pakistan, Qatar, Saint Kitts and Nevis, Saint Vincent and Grenadines, Saudi Arabia, Senegal, Singapore, South Africa, South Sudan, Sri Lanka, Sudan, Suriname, Tanzania, Thailand, Togo, Trinidad and Tobago, Tunisia, Uganda, United Arab Emirates, Vanuatu, Yemen	–	30.05%
Absent	18	Afghanistan, Armenia, Azerbaijan, Benin, Burkina Faso, Djibouti, Equatorial Guinea, Guinea, Lebanon, Mauritania, Morocco, Rwanda, São Tomé and Príncipe, Solomon Islands, Somalia, Turkmenistan, Venezuela, (Note: Venezuela was suspended from voting in the 76th session and the 11th emergency special session owing to its failure to pay dues in the previous two years, for which it did not receive a special waiver from the Assembly.) Zambia	–	9.33%
Total	193	–	100%	100%
Source: A/RES/ES-11/3 voting record

=== 10–12 October 2022 ===
Resolution ES-11/4 vote In favour: 143 Against: 5 Abstained: 35 Absent: 10 Non-member

The emergency special session reconvened on 10 October to discuss Russia's staged annexation referendums in the Donetsk, Kherson, Luhansk and Zaporizhzhia oblasts of Ukraine as well as the subsequent attempted annexation of these regions. The meeting was called following Russia's veto on a Security Council resolution condemning its actions.

On 12 October, the General Assembly adopted Resolution ES-11/4 declaring that the staged referendums and attempted annexation of these regions are invalid and illegal under international law. The resolution called on all members to not recognize Russia's actions and for Russia to immediately withdraw its forces from Ukraine to restore its territorial integrity. The resolution was adopted with 143 countries voting in favour, 5 against and 35 abstaining, which was considered an overwhelming vote considering that it received the most votes in favour of all resolutions dealing with the Russian invasion of Ukraine so far.

Voting on Resolution ES-11/4
Vote	Tally	States	Percent of votes	Percent of member states
In favour	143	Afghanistan, Albania, Andorra, Angola, Antigua and Barbuda, Argentina, Australia, Austria, Bahamas, Bahrain, Bangladesh, Barbados, Belgium, Belize, Benin, Bhutan, Bosnia-Herzegovina, Botswana, Brazil, Brunei, Bulgaria, Cambodia, Canada, Cape Verde, Chad, Chile, Colombia, Comoros, Costa Rica, Côte d'Ivoire, Croatia, Cyprus, Czech Republic, Democratic Republic of the Congo, Denmark, Dominica, Dominican Republic, Ecuador, Egypt, Estonia, Fiji, Finland, France, Gabon, Gambia, Georgia, Germany, Ghana, Greece, Grenada, Guatemala, Guinea-Bissau, Guyana, Haiti, Hungary, Iceland, Indonesia, Iraq, Ireland, Israel, Italy, Jamaica, Japan, Jordan, Kenya, Kiribati, Kuwait, Latvia, Lebanon, Liberia, Libya, Liechtenstein, Lithuania, Luxembourg, Madagascar, Malawi, Malaysia, Maldives, Malta, Marshall Islands, Mauritania, Mauritius, Mexico, Micronesia, Moldova, Monaco, Montenegro, Morocco, Myanmar, Nauru, Nepal, Netherlands, New Zealand, Niger, Nigeria, North Macedonia, Norway, Oman, Palau, Panama, Papua New Guinea, Paraguay, Peru, Philippines, Poland, Portugal, Qatar, Republic of Korea, Romania, Rwanda, Saint Kitts and Nevis, Saint Lucia, Saint Vincent and Grenadines, Samoa, San Marino, Saudi Arabia, Senegal, Serbia, Seychelles, Sierra Leone, Singapore, Slovakia, Slovenia, Solomon Islands, Somalia, Spain, Suriname, Sweden, Switzerland, Timor-Leste, Tonga, Trinidad and Tobago, Tunisia, Turkey, Tuvalu, Ukraine, United Arab Emirates, United Kingdom, United States, Uruguay, Vanuatu, Yemen, Zambia	96.62%	74.09%
Against	5	Belarus, North Korea, Nicaragua, Russian Federation, Syria	3.38%	2.59%
Abstain	35	Algeria, Armenia, Bolivia, Burundi, Central African Republic, China, Congo, Cuba, Eritrea, Eswatini, Ethiopia, Guinea, Honduras, India, Kazakhstan, Kyrgyzstan, Laos, Lesotho, Mali, Mongolia, Mozambique, Namibia, Pakistan, South Africa, South Sudan, Sri Lanka, Sudan, Tajikistan, Thailand, Togo, Uganda, Tanzania, Uzbekistan, Vietnam, Zimbabwe	–	19.69%
Absent	10	Azerbaijan, Burkina Faso, Cameroon, Djibouti, El Salvador, Equatorial Guinea, Iran, São Tomé and Príncipe, Turkmenistan, Venezuela (Note: Venezuela was suspended from voting in the 76th session and the 11th emergency special session owing to its failure to pay dues in the previous two years, for which it did not receive a special waiver from the Assembly.)	–	5.18%
Total	193	–	100%	100%
Source: A/ES-11/4 voting record

=== 14 November 2022 ===
On 7 November 2022, a letter requesting resumption of the emergency session was submitted to the President by representatives from Canada, Guatemala, Netherlands and Ukraine for the "Furtherance of remedy and reparation for aggression against Ukraine". It was adopted by the general assembly as Resolution ES-11/5 on 14 November 2022.

=== 22–23 February 2023 ===
The 18th plenary meeting of the 11th emergency special session was brought to order on 23 February 2023. The General Assembly adopted Resolution ES-11/6 with 141 countries voting in favour, 7 against and 32 abstaining, calling for a "comprehensive, just and lasting peace" in Ukraine in line with the principles of the U.N. Charter and demanding that Russia withdraws all of its military forces.

=== 24 February 2025 ===
Resolution ES-11/7 vote In favour: 93 Against: 18 Abstained: 65 Absent: 17 Non-member

The emergency special session met again on 24 February 2025 and adopted Resolution ES-11/7 by a vote of 93 in favour, 18 against and 65 abstentions. United Nations General Assembly Resolution ES-11/8 was subsequently proposed and then adopted as amended, 93 countries voting for, 8 against, 73 abstentions and 19 present not voting.

=== 3 December 2025 ===
The emergency special session convened on 3 December 2025 and adopted Resolution ES-11/9 by a vote of 91 in favour, 12 against and 57 abstentions. The resolution demands that Russia ensures the immediate, safe and unconditional return of all Ukrainian children who have been forcibly transferred or deported.

=== 24 February 2026 ===
On the fourth anniversary from the start of Russia's full-scale invasion of Ukraine, the emergency special session met on 24 February 2026 and adopted Resolution ES-11/10 by a vote of 107 in favour, 12 against and 51 abstentions. The resolution calls for an immediate ceasefire, the release of all unlawfully detained persons, and the return of all internees and of civilians forcibly transferred to their country of origin.

== Resolutions ==
- Resolution ES-11/1
- Resolution ES-11/2
- Resolution ES-11/3
- Resolution ES-11/4
- Resolution ES-11/5
- Resolution ES-11/6
- Resolution ES-11/7
- Resolution ES-11/8
- Resolution ES-11/9
- Resolution ES-11/10

== See also ==
- Legality of the Russian invasion of Ukraine
- Government and intergovernmental reactions to the Russian invasion of Ukraine
- Independent International Commission of Inquiry on Ukraine
- List of UN General Assembly sessions
