= Ginko =

Ginko may refer to:

== People with the given name ==
- Ginko Abukawa-Chiba (虻川-千葉 吟子; born 1938), is a retired Japanese gymnast
- Adachi Ginkō (安達 吟光; 1853–1908), Japanese artist
- Ogino Ginko (荻野 吟子; 1851–1913), Japanese physician
- Ginko Sato (佐藤 ギン子; 1934-2023), Japanese government official
- Elena Ginko, (born 1976) Belarusian race walker
- Viktor Ginko, (born 1965) Belarusian race walker

== Characters ==
- Inspector Ginko, a character in Italian comic series Diabolik
- The main character in the Japanese manga Mushishi
- Lisa Silverman, a character from the PlayStation video game Persona 2. "Ginko" is her nickname.
- Ginko Momose, a main character in the mobile app Link! Like! Love Live!
- Ginko, the alias of Gintoki Sakata from Gintama

== Media ==
- Children of Ginko, is a children's opera by Marcus Paus
- Diabolik: Ginko Attacks!, is a 2022 Italian crime action film

== Places ==
- Tokyo Ginko Kyokai Building, Tokyo Bankers Association Building in Marunouchi district of Tokyo

== Others ==
- Ginkō, Japanese for Bank
- Ginko Financial, an alleged Ponzi scheme
- Giotti Victoria Ginko, is a city car
- a haiku walk

== See also ==
- Ginkgo biloba: a plant (tree), food (seed from tree), and herbal extract (from leaf)
- Ginkgo: The mostly extinct genus of tree of which Ginkgo biloba is the only known survivor
- Ginkgo Bioworks, an American biotechnology company
