= List of Indigenous rights organizations =

This is a list of indigenous rights organizations. Some of these organizations are members of other organizations listed in this article. Sometimes local organizations associated with particular groups of indigenous people will join in a regional or national organization, which in turn can join an even higher organization, along with other member supraorganizations.

The "International" section is for organizations that are open to work with indigenous peoples around the world. These organizations are not limited to a specific area or with specific Indigenous Peoples. They are listed by country of origin. The organizations in the "Regional" section are listed by the area in which they work. The regions and countries in this part of the list indicate the area in which these organizations operate.

== International ==
=== Denmark ===
- International Work Group for Indigenous Affairs (IWGIA)

=== Germany ===
- Friends of Peoples Close to Nature (fPcN)

=== Netherlands ===
- FERN
- Global Forest Coalition (GFC)

=== Switzerland ===
- Indigenous Peoples' Centre for Documentation, Research and Information (Docip)
- International Committee for the Indians of America (Incomindios Switzerland)

=== United Kingdom ===
- Forest Peoples Programme (FPP)
- Minority Rights Group International (MRG)
- Rainforest Foundation UK
- Survival International

=== Turkey ===
- KAFFED

=== United States ===
- Amazon Conservation Team (ACT)
- Amazon Watch
- Center for International Environmental Law (CIEL)
- Center for World Indigenous Studies (CWIS)
- Cultural Survival
- Indigenous Peoples Council on Biocolonialism (IPCB)
- Indigenous Peoples Law and Policy Program (IPLP)
- International Indian Treaty Council (IITC)
- Land is Life
- Mexica Movement
- Rainforest Foundation US
- Rights and Resources Initiative (RRI)
- Terralingua
- The Red Nation

=== Uruguay ===
- World Rainforest Movement (WRM)

== Regional ==
=== Regions ===
==== Africa ====
- Indigenous Peoples of Africa Co-ordinating Committee (IPACC)

==== Amazon Basin ====
- Coordinator of Indigenous Organizations of the Amazon River Basin (COICA)

==== Arctic ====
- Free Buryatia Foundation (FBF)
- Hokkaido Utari Association
- Inuit Circumpolar Council (ICC)
- Saami Council

==== Europe ====
- Mejlis of the Crimean Tatar People

==== Asia ====
- Asia Indigenous Peoples Pact
- British Tamil Association
- British Tamils Forum
- Free Tibet
- Global Tamil Forum
- Kuki Inpi
- Tamils Rehabilitation Organisation
- World Uyghur Congress (WUC)

=== Countries ===
==== Australia ====
- Blak Sovereignty Movement
- Kimberley Land Council (KLC)
- Reconciliation Australia

==== Bolivia ====
- Confederación de Pueblos Indígenas de Bolivia (CIDOB)
- Consejo Nacional de Ayllus y Markas del Qullasuyu (CONAMAQ)

==== Botswana ====
- First People of the Kalahari (FPK)

==== Brazil ====
- Coordenação das Organizações Indígenas da Amazônia Brasileira (COIAB)
- Conselho Indigenista Missionário (CIMI)

==== Canada ====
- Assembly of First Nations (AFN)
- Congress of Aboriginal Peoples (CAP)
- National Association of Friendship Centres
- Federation of Saskatchewan Indian Nations (FSIN)
- Government of Nunavut
- Inuit Tapiriit Kanatami (ITK)
- Manitoba Métis Federation (MMF)
- Métis National Council (MNC)
- Mohawk Warrior Society
- Native Women's Association of Canada (NWAC)
- Nunavut Tunngavik Incorporated (NTI)
- Pauktuutit
- RAVEN (Respecting Aboriginal Values & Environmental Needs)

==== Colombia ====
- Organización Nacional Indígena de Colombia (ONIC)

==== Chile ====
- Coordinadora Arauco-Malleco (CAM)
- Weichán Auka Mapu (WAM)

==== Ecuador ====
- Confederación de Nacionalidades Indígenas del Ecuador (CONAIE)
- Confederación de las Nacionalidades Indígenas de la Amazonia Ecuatoriana (CONFENIAE)
- Confederación de Pueblos de la Nacionalidad Kichuas del Ecuador (ECUARUNARI)

==== India ====
- Government of Andhra Pradesh
- Government of Arunachal Pradesh
- Government of Assam
- Government of Karnataka
- Government of Kerala
- Government of Manipur
- Government of Meghalaya
- Government of Mizoram
- Government of Nagaland
- Government of Sikkim
- Government of Tamil Nadu
- Government of Telangana
- Government of Tripura

==== Indonesia ====
- Yayasan Merah Putih (YMP)

==== Iraq ====
- Kurdistan Regional Government (KRG)

==== Japan ====
- Ainu Association of Hokkaido

==== Malaysia ====
- Department of Orang Asli Development (JAKOA)

==== Mexico ====
- Popular Indigenous Council of Oaxaca "Ricardo Flores Magón" (CIPO-RFM)
- Zapatista Army of National Liberation (EZLN)

==== Namibia ====
- Namrights

==== Nigeria ====
- Movement for the Survival of the Ogoni People (MOSOP)

==== Norway ====
- Norske Samers Riksforbund (NSR)
- Samenes Folkeforbund (People's Federation of the Saami)

==== Peru ====
- Asociación Interétnica de Desarrollo de la Selva Peruana (AIDESEP)
- Peru Support Group (PSG)

==== Russia ====
- Association of Sámi in Murmansk Oblast
- Free Nations of Post-Russia Forum
- Government of Bashkortostan
- Government of the Sakha Republic
- Government of Tatarstan
- Russian Association of Indigenous Peoples of the North (RAIPON)

==== Spain ====
- Basque Government
- Council of Government of the Principality of Asturias
- Generalitat de Catalunya
- Generalitat Valenciana
- Gobierno de Aragón
- Government of Navarre
- Regional Government of Galicia

==== Taiwan ====
- Council of Indigenous Peoples

==== United States ====
- Alaska Federation of Natives
- American Indian Defense Association (AIDA)
- American Indian Movement (AIM)
- Great Lakes Indian Fish & Wildlife Commission (GLIFWC)
- Honor the Earth
- Indigenous Environmental Network (IEN)
- International Indian Treaty Council (IITC)
- Inter-Tribal Environmental Council (ITEC)
- National Congress of American Indians (NCAI)
- National Indian Youth Council (NIYC)
- Native American Rights Fund (NARF)
- White Earth Land Recovery Project (WELRP)
- Women's National Indian Association

== Governmental ==
=== Regional ===
Africa

- African Commission on Human and Peoples' Rights (ACHPR)

Arctic

- Arctic Council

Australia

- National Indigenous Australians Agency
- National Native Title Tribunal

Brazil

- Fundação Nacional do Índio (FUNAI)

Canada

- Aboriginal Affairs and Northern Development Canada (AADNC)

China

- State Ethnic Affairs Commission

France

- Ministry of the Overseas

India

- Ministry of Development of North Eastern Region

Malaysia

- Department of Orang Asli Development (JAKOA)

Mexico

- Comisión Nacional para el Desarrollo de los Pueblos Indígenas (CDI)

New Zealand

- Minister of Māori Affairs

Philippines

- National Commission on Indigenous Peoples (NCIP)
- Bangsamoro
  - Ministry of Indigenous Peoples' Affairs (MIPA)

Russia

- Ministry for the Development of the Russian Far East and Arctic

South Africa

- Department of Traditional Affairs

Sri Lanka

- Ministry of National Languages and Social Integration

United States

- Bureau of Indian Affairs

=== International ===
- United Nations Permanent Forum on Indigenous Issues (UNPFII)
- Unrepresented Nations and Peoples Organization (UNPO)

== See also ==
- List of human rights organisations
- List of ethnic organizations in the United States
