= Saskia Ozinga =

Dutch environmental and social activist

Saskia Luutsche Ozinga (born 1960 in Beverwijk) is a Dutch environmental and social activist. She is the facilitator of the Forest Movement Europe (FME) and the co-founder of the NGO FERN, which she was the campaigns coordinator, between 1995 and 2017.

== Biography ==
Saskia Ozinga holds master's degrees in Biology from Wageningen University and Healthcare from the University of Utrecht, Netherlands. After working as a teacher for environmental sciences at the University in Utrecht, Saskia Ozinga joined Friends of the Earth. She worked as an education officer for Friends of the Earth Netherlands from 1987 until 1990, when she took on the position of forest campaigner. In 1991, Saskia took on the role of facilitator of the newly created Forest Movement Europe (FME), role that she still hosts at present.

In March 1995 Saskia co-founded, together with Sian Pettman, the organisation FERN with a mandate to monitor EU activities in relation to forests, inform and educate the Forest Movement Europe about these activities and facilitate joint advocacy work towards the different EU institutions. She is also a board member of Forest Peoples Programme, Stichting Tropenbos International and Taiga Rescue Network, and member of the steering committee of the World Rainforest Movement.

She now lives with her partner Mark Gregory and her daughter in Oxfordshire. Mark is a former BBC Radio World Service journalist.

== Works ==
Books/reports

- Funding forests into the future? How the European Fund for Rural Development affects Europe’s forests. Ed Fenton, Leontien Krul, Saskia Ozinga and Richard Wainwright (2008)
- Provoking change - A toolkit for African NGOs. Saskia Ozinga and Iola Leal Riesco (2007)
- Funding Europe's Forests - How to use EU funds for sustainable forest management and nature protection. Leontien Krul and Saskia Ozinga (2006)
- Footprints in the Forest; Current practice and future challenges in forest certification. Saskia Ozinga (2004)
- A Guide to EU campaigning. Saskia Ozinga and Emily Thenard (2004)
- Status of Implementation of Forest-Related Clauses in the CBD. Berenice Muraille and Saskia Ozinga (2002)
- Controlling the imports of illegally sourced timber. Options for Europe. Duncan Brack; Chantal Marijnissen and Saskia Ozinga (2002)
- Behind the logo, a social and environmental impact assessment of forest certification schemes. Saskia Ozinga (2001)
- What Progress? A review of the implementation of the IPF Proposals by Actions by different Governments. Saskia Ozinga, Sofia Ryder, Bill Mankin and Hans Verolme (2000)
- The implementation of the IPF Proposals for action in Europe. Saskia Ozinga, Sofia Ryder (2000)
- The impact of trade liberalisation in the forest products sector. Saskia Ozinga; Tim Rice; Chantal Marijnissen and Mark Gregory (2000)
- Trade liberalisation and its impact on forests, an overview of the relevant issues. Saskia Ozinga; Tim Rice; Chantal Marijnissen and Mark Gregory (2000)
- EG hulp naar tropische bossen, naar een nieuwe koers (An evaluation of EC Aid policies to Tropical Forests). Saskia Ozinga (1999)
- Europe and the world's forests. Edited and published together with the Forest People's programme. Saskia Ozinga and Marcus Colchester (1998)
- Forest Certification at the EU-level. Saskia Ozinga (1997)
- Production and consumption of timber and timber products, with an emphasis on the Netherlands. Saskia Ozinga (1995)
