= FERN =

Dutch non-governmental organization

Fern
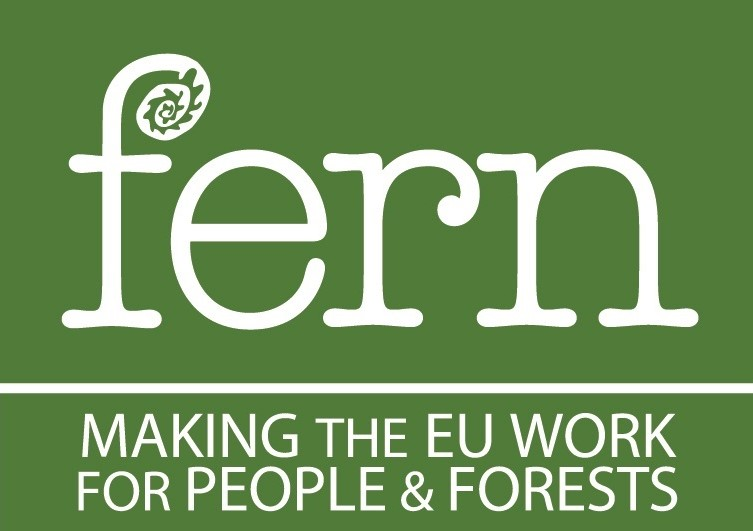
- Founded: 1995, The Netherlands
- Type: Non governmental organisation
- Location(s): Brussels, Belgium; Moreton-in-Marsh, UK
- Region served: Global
- Method: Campaigning, research, networking, capacity building
- Key people: Hannah Mowat; Iola Leal Riesco (ex-staff); Saskia Ozinga (ex-staff); Richard Wainwright; Julia Christian; Kelsey Perlman
- Budget: €4,304,842 EUR (2022)
- Employees: 15+
- Website: https://www.fern.org/

Fern (also Stichting Fern) is a Dutch foundation created in 1995. It is an international non-governmental organization (NGO) set up to keep track of the European Union's (EU) involvement in forests and coordinate NGO activities at the European level. Fern works to protect forests and the rights of people who depend on them.

Although Fern is known for its work on forests, since 2000 it has widened its scope to include climate, forest governance, trade and sustainable supply chain as many of the decisions made in these areas have a direct or indirect impact on forests and forest peoples' rights. In all these areas, Fern collaborates with many environmental groups and social movements across the world.

Fern is a non-hierarchical flat organization and has no director. In 2024, it had three offices (Brussels, Belgium; Montreuil, France; and Moreton-in-Marsh, UK) and around 18 staff; their registered office is in Delft.

Fern's official mission statement is "To increase understanding of, and access to, European policy making; and to campaign for policies and practices in Europe that focus on forests and forest peoples’ rights and deliver economic, environmental and social justice globally.”

== History ==
Fern's origin lies in the World Rainforest Movement meeting in Penang in 1989. At this meeting Southern participants decided they needed closer co-operation with a network of like-minded European organisations to further their objectives. An already existing ad hoc European coalition of NGOs responded and adopted the name European Rainforest Movement. This movement changed its name into Forest Movement Europe in 1994 after linking up with the newly formed Taiga Rescue Network (1992) and widening its focus to all forests, including Russia.

As most NGOs of the Forest Movement Europe were working at national level, and increasingly trade and aid decisions that impacted on forests were made at EU level, it was felt by most in the movement that more attention should be given to influencing the EU institutions. So, in March 1995 Saskia Ozinga (formerly working for Friends of the Earth in the Netherlands) and Sian Pettman (formerly working for the European Commission) created the Fern with a mandate to monitor EU activities relating to forests, and inform and educate the Forest Movement Europe about these activities and facilitate joint advocacy work towards the different EU institutions.

Starting in 1995 with Ozinga and Pettman both working part-time, the former from a shed in Oxford, the latter from a desk in Brussels, Fern has grown to an organisation of between 15 and 20 staff, while its area of work has widened to include climate change, carbon trading, finance, governance and development aid. Consistent themes in Fern's campaigns include tackling the corruption, lack of transparency and power imbalances which it says are among the universal causes of both legal and illegal forest destruction, and putting forest communities at the heart of decision-making about policies affecting them.

Fern's way of working still reflects its origin, as in its activities the organisation aims to create ad hoc or permanent North-South, North-North or South-South NGO coalitions to jointly develop campaigns or activities, mostly - but not always - targeted at the EU institutions. Facilitation of the wider movement and supporting Fern's partners in the South remain Fern core activities.

In March 2018, Fern's co-founder and Campaigns Coordinator Saskia Ozinga stepped down after 23 years with Fern. Hannah Mowat took over as the organisation's Campaigns Coordinator.

== Fields of activity ==
The organisation campaigns in many areas with a direct or indirect impact on forests and forest peoples' rights. It focuses specifically on the policies and practices of the European Union, since together with its Member States, the EU is collectively the world's single biggest aid donor, and also plays a pivotal role in global trade, and therefore has a vast influence on the fate of the world's forests and their inhabitants.

To achieve its aims, Fern produces original research in briefings and reports; it builds NGO coalitions with its partners and affected peoples in the global South and Europe, and campaigns collaboratively with them; it raises awareness among decision-makers and proposes specific policy changes to tackle the threats facing the world's forests.

A significant portion of Fern's funding is channelled to its partners in tropical forested countries, and Fern says it prioritises supporting them (including in the form of building capacity and strengthening their advocacy skills) as they understand the issues facing forests in their countries first-hand.

Fern also plays a coordinating role in building networks and alliances among NGOs, a prime example being the annual Forest Movement Europe (FME) meeting which it organises.

Since 1996, Fern has published Forest Watch, a monthly specialist newsletter covering the latest developments in efforts to protect the world's forests.

== Campaigns ==
Fern currently focuses on forests in relation to four overarching forest issues: Climate, Consumption, Development Aid and Trade. To achieve its aims, Fern works closely with environmental as well as social NGOs in Europe and the South.

Fern’s climate campaign calls for an EU climate policy which prioritises restoring European forests and ending subsidies for the burning of trees for bioenergy. Fern's climate campaigning also encompasses work on forest restoration, negative emissions, free trade agreements, land use, land use change and forestry (LULUCF), and carbon offsetting.

Fern’s sustainable supply chains campaign focuses on the biggest cause of deforestation globally: agriculture. The EU is the world's second biggest importer of agricultural goods causing deforestation. Fern campaigns to end EU imports of commodities - such as soy, palm oil and cocoa - grown on (often) illegally deforested land. In 2023, the EU adopted the Regulation on deforestation-free products, a long-awaited law Fern pushed for in the last decade. Fern now works to ensure the Regulation is effectively implemented in consultation and partnership with producer countries.

As part of its trade and sustainable supply chain campaigns, Fern has been instrumental in highlighting what it says are the damaging potential human rights and environmental impacts of the European Union - Mercosur free trade agreement. Fern’s sustainable supply chain and trade campaigns also focus on ensuring trade in transition minerals does not lead to harm for forests and peoples by campaigning on the Critical Raw Materials Act (CRM Act).

Fern’s consumption campaign aims to ensure that EU policies can fairly and swiftly reduce European consumption of Forest Risk Commodities. Fern campaigns to reduce pulp and paper use through work on the Packaging and Packaging Waste Regulation (PPWR) in response to the dramatically increase of paper consumption. Fern also works to reduce European meat consumption by leveraging the EU Sustainable Food System Framework.

The Forest Governance campaign works to ensure that forest communities have stronger rights to their forests and benefit from transparent and inclusive forest management practices and processes.

Previous Fern campaign’s include those on Export Credit Agencies (ECAs), biodiversity offsetting, certification, and Development Finance Institutions, aviation and finance. Fern has been described as “slightly left”.

== Achievements ==
Some of the most visible Fern achievements include:

- Convincing the EU to regulate against imported deforestation; A decade long advocacy work by Fern, its allies and organisations in the Global South, contributed to the adoption of the EU Regulation on deforestation-free products, the world’s first law of its kind;
- Pushing for the EU to play a key role in tackling climate change; In the latest review of the LULUCF Regulation, Fern successfully advocated for biodiversity criteria and targets;
- The rejection of the scientifically flawed concept of planting trees to reverse climate change (‘carbon sinks’) by the European Parliament;
- Highlighting the undue and unjust influence by large companies on environmental and social laws in host countries when executing large projects, such as the Chad-Cameroon pipeline;
- Improving integration of environmental concerns and demands for recognition of indigenous peoples rights' into EU aid programmes and policies and the creation of networks of Southern NGOs to improve the quality of EU aid;
- Getting the EU to reduce illegal logging and improve forest governance through adopting and implementing the Forest Law Enforcement, Governance and Trade (FLEGT) Action Plan - a pioneering programme to tackle illegal imports of timber, strengthen community rights and improve the way forests are managed; Fern is also co-manager of the FLEGT website "LoggingOff".
- Successfully coordinating the European network for reforming export credit agencies leading to the adoption of environmental guidelines for export credit agencies.

Some of Fern's successes have reduced threats to forest communities' livelihoods. For example, Fern's work on highlighting the flaws in carbon sinks and direct correspondence with the Clean Development Mechanism (CDM) board, has led the CDM board to reject all plantation projects put to it, many of which would have had serious negative impacts on people.

The EU FLEGT Action Plan to combat illegal logging would not have been drafted without Fern. This Action Plan - if implemented properly - will create a leverage point to get customary rights accepted as 'legal' in countries including Indonesia (which is already exporting FLEGT timber), Ghana, Cameroon, Vietnam and Guyana: the lack of recognition of these rights are among the most significant obstacles to poverty alleviation, justice and even democracy.

Moreover, the campaign on reforming ECAs led to halting ECA funding and the subsequent cancellation of some projects, which would have had serious negative consequences for local people, such as in the case of the Ilisu Dam in Turkey which would have led to the replacement of around 80,000 people, with women suffering most.

== Funding ==
Fern receives its money from private foundations and governments. In order to ensure its independence and impartiality, Fern has committed to not directly participate in the selection, award or administration of a contract when a real or apparent conflict of interest may be involved. Fern's audited finances are available from their website.

Fern’s donors during 2022 included: the Ford Foundation, the Foreign, Commonwealth and Development Office (FCDO) UK, the European Commission, the European Climate Foundation and the Norwegian Agency for Development Cooperation (NORAD).

== See also ==
- Forest Peoples Programme
- World Rainforest Movement
