= Forest Movement Europe =

The Forest Movement Europe (FME) is a grouping of more than 45 NGOs from 12 European countries working on forest issues. The movement has been in existence, although under different names, for more than 15 years. Its purpose is to share information, to develop joint strategies and a wider European perspective on forest issues. The FME also supports NGOs and Indigenous Peoples Organisations in the South in their activities to protect forests.

== History ==
The origin of the movement goes back to 1989 when a group of NGOs from several different European countries joint efforts to support Japanese organisations in their activities to stop the destruction of the rainforests by Japanese companies. This group of NGOs met under the heading Ban Japan from the Rainforest.

By 1992 the group had expanded considerably in size and in the issues it dealt with. Its focus was no longer Japanese companies but tropical rainforest protection and support for forest peoples in general. At a meeting in Munich, Germany, the group renamed itself the European Rainforest Movement (ERM), the European arm of the World Rainforest Movement. It choose to be a loose movement with no formal membership and without a formal secretariat. Meetings were held twice a year, hosted by one of the participating groups and coordinated by Saskia Ozinga of FERN. It was mainly due to the activities of the groups that participated in the ERM that the tropical rainforest campaigns in Europe took off, imports of tropical timber into several European countries declined and the struggle of forest peoples, e.g. in Sarawak, Malaysia and the Amazon were headline stories.

Environmental organisations in the boreal forests who had been working in their own countries to protect these forests decided they needed outside support. The formation of the Taiga Rescue Network (TRN) in 1992 was a crucial moment. The coordinator of the TRN, Karin Lindahl, contacted Saskia Ozinga to join forces. From that moment onwards, groups working on the boreal forests joined the ERM which was by definition not only working on tropical forests. Therefore in 1994 the group decided to change its name to Forest Movement Europe (FME).

Currently the FME meets once a year. Meetings are hosted by participating organisations and are organised by FERN.
