= Elizabeth Palmer (disambiguation) =

Elizabeth Palmer is a journalist.

Elizabeth Palmer may also refer to:

- Elizabeth Mary Palmer (1832–1897), New Zealand singer, music teacher, and composer
- Elizabeth Palmer (figure skater) in 2006 U.S. Figure Skating Championships
- Elizabeth Palmer (schooner) from List of shipwrecks in January 1915
- Elizabeth Palmer, recipient of Primetime Emmy Award for Outstanding Costumes for a Series
- Elizabeth Palmer (activist) (1913–2014), American activist for the World YWCA
- Lizzie Merrill Palmer (1838–1916), American philanthropist

== See also ==
- Betsy Palmer (1926–2015), American actress
- Elizabeth Palmer Peabody (1804–1894), American educator
