= World Conference on Women, 1980 =

The World Conference of the United Nations Decade for Women, 1980, or the Second World Conference on Women, took place between July 14 and July 30, 1980 in Copenhagen, Denmark, as the mid-decade assessment of progress and failure in implementing the goals established by the World Plan of Action at the 1975 inaugural conference on women. The most significant event to come out of the conference was the formal signing of the Convention on the Elimination of All Forms of Discrimination Against Women, which took place during the opening ceremony of the conference. Marred by conflict and the politicization of international and national events that had little to do with women's issues, the conference was viewed by some participants as a failure. They were able to secure passage of a modified World Programme of Action to expand on previous targets to improve women's status and establish a follow-up conference for the end of the decade.

== History ==
The 1980 Conference held from 14 and 30 July in Copenhagen, Denmark was the direct result of the First World Conference on Women, which had been held in Mexico City in 1975, establishing the World Plan of Action and Declaration of Mexico on the Equality of Women and Their Contribution to Development and Peace. These documents took the United Nations themes—Development, Equality, and Peace—of their path for women and created guidelines for nations to reach long-term objectives to improve the lives of women. When they were adopted, the UN established 1975 to 1985 as the Decade for Women and put in motion a plan for subsequent conferences to evaluate progress being made. The format of the conference was the same, with the official session made up of delegates representing their governments and the Tribune, representing NGOs.

As with the previous conference, the Copenhagen conference was beset by the geopolitical divides of the Cold War and whether economics, racism, or sexism was the more important factor in the subordination of women. Initially planned to occur in Tehran, the Iranian Revolution of 1979 and the Iran hostage crisis, escalated the political backdrop as did the continuing tensions of conflict in the Middle East. Palestinian women, refugees, and Apartheid became topics that were added to the agenda and ensured that the event would be politicized by the various participants, rather than remaining focused on women's issues. To that end, the United States Congress issued instructions to its delegates that they would not approve any resolution which attempted to make what should be an apolitical conference into an indictment of government policy or any resolution which mentioned the word "Zionism". Saudi Arabia and South Africa boycotted the convention altogether. Having to hastily relocate the conference to Denmark, also impacted the accommodations available, in that there was no space large enough to accommodate the entire Tribune, which meant that rather than the entire group participating in exchange to create unity, the group was splintered into small venues.

=== Official conference ===
The conference was the mid-point review of the decade, and the conference president was Lise Østergaard, Cultural Minister of Denmark. The secretary-general of the conference was Lucille Mair, a Jamaican academic and single mother, whose primary focus was on the development theme of the triad. Discussion on the New International Economic Order subverted the discussion from being about what women needed to what the various governments needed from women or for women to reach their national goals. At one point, it was suggested that if Westernized nations would provide more funding for economic development, discrimination against women would vanish. Partisan political issues, such as insertion of the socialist economic system into the section dealing with the historical perspective on women, the repeated interruption of Israeli delegates with Muslim drummers and singers, and a storming of the conference by women protesting the Bolivian coup d'état were just some of the manifestations of the divides.

One hundred forty-five states with around 1500 delegates participated in the official session, including delegates like: Aleksandra Pavlovna Biryukova of the USSR; Shirley Field-Ridley of Guyana; Ana Sixta González de Cuadros of Colombia; Helga Hörz of East Germany; Maïmouna Kane of Senegal; Sheila Kaul of India; Ifigenia Martínez of Mexico; Gabriele Matzner-Holzer of Austria; Inonge Mbikusita-Lewanika of Zambia; Elizabeth Anne Reid of Australia; Ginko Sato of Japan; Umayya Toukan of Jordan; Sarah Weddington, who headed the US delegation, among many others. May Sayegh of Palestine was also present at the conference. Sally Mugabe, the wife of Robert Mugabe, prime minister of a newly-independent Zimbabwe, was elected vice president of the conference to honor the role of Zimbabwe's women in the anti-colonial struggle.

After opening remarks by Kurt Waldheim, Secretary-General of the United Nations, Queen Margrethe II of Denmark welcomed participants and expressed her hope that the conference would prove productive. Anker Jørgensen, Danish prime minister, spoke briefly, followed by opening remarks by Lise Østergaard, followed by the general discussion. Debates were strongly affected by post-colonial and socialist claims of women's advancement in centrally planned economies in which the state had an obligation to prevent and an accountability for discrimination against women. Having established mechanisms in the previous conference to gather data on the status of women, review of the statistical data showed that women's security had dwindled over the preceding five-year period. Among the documentation were statistics showing that while women put in two-thirds of all working hours, they received only one-tenth of the income, owning one-hundredth of its assets. Economic stagnation and industrialization in the period had led to significant increases in unemployment and benefits for women. Jobs which were available confined women to insecure, low-paid, and sex-stereotyped jobs and as much of their labor was toward unpaid production, it was still invisible in compiled economic reports. Decreased earnings had elevated health concerns. While literacy rates for middle class women increased, overall illiteracy among women increased. One of the most contentious issues discussed was the situation of households headed by women. Many officials denied that there could be such a thing, as legally in their countries women were not allowed to be the head of a household. On the other hand, one of the most memorable moments was when the delegates signed the Convention on the Elimination of All Forms of Discrimination Against Women (CEDAW) on 17 July.

The first committee, under the chair Maïmouna Kane, with vice-chairs, Rafidah Aziz of Malaysia, Maria Groza of Romania, and Leónidas Páez de Virgili of Paraguay, with Rapporteur Marijke Van Hemeldonck of Belgium, discussed the effects of Apartheid and the Israeli-occupied territories on women; the progress and obstacles in attaining the objectives of the World Plan of Action; and the proposal for the World Programme of Action for the second-half of the Decade for Women. Of major concern was labor insecurity, caused either by the introduction of technologies which replaced women laborers or by the informal nature of many jobs open to women in developing countries. The committee discussed that more effort should be made to retrain laborers when their positions were eliminated by technological advances and that legal protections should be enacted. Also of grave concern was education of women to not only eliminate illiteracy but to make them aware of social and political processes and how they could be part of decision-making mechanisms. Apartheid and racism were condemned by the committee, as was the Zionist policy of Israel which was linked to racism. The discussion on the Palestinian right to self-determination was endorsed, though it was noted that when the Palestinian people as a whole were denied basic human rights, discussing the rights of only women was futile. Various draft resolutions, including resolutions to improve education and training, address women with disabilities, provide support for women migrants and refugees, provide economic security for elderly women, and to address violence against women. With modifications, the committee recommended approval of the Programme and accepted CEDAW with few reservations.

The second committee, under the chair Sheila Kaul, with vice-chairs, Nermin Abadan-Unat of Turkey, María de Lourdes Castro e Silva de Vincenzi of Brazil, and Chavdar Kyuranov of Bulgaria, with Rapporteur Ali Benbouchta of Morocco, discussed an agenda identical to the first committee's focal points. Apartheid was rejected and the committee recommended that with its eradication, women in South Africa and bordering refugee states should be compensated with the means to reconstruct their societies in ways that created avenues for women's participation. With regard to the review of the Programme, the committee noted that without change in socio-economic systems, equality for women remained elusive. It was noted that globalization led to an increasing need to pursue paths for disarmament, peace and international cooperation. It was also noted that regional systems needed to be fully integrated to allow women's participation but additionally new programs organized specifically for women should be explored. The situation of refugee women, their vulnerabilities to exploitation and violence and the need to protect their human rights. On the question of Palestinian women, the committee recognized that material assistance would do little to stop insecurity unless Israel ended its colonization, returned land to its owners and worked toward a durable peace. The committee examined several draft resolutions regarding peace initiatives, refugees, water insecurity, and adding women to census figures, as well as draft resolutions on health and welfare, protecting families from defaulted support obligations, drug trafficking and forced disappearance, and integrating women into the UN system and programs. With modifications, the committee recommended approval of the Programme.

=== Tribune ===
The planning of the 1980 Tribune, or Forum as it was called in Copenhagen, was led by Edith Ballantyne, the executive secretary of the Women's International League for Peace and Freedom (WILPF) and president of the United Nations Conference of Non-governmental Organizations (CONGO). Elizabeth Palmer, a representative of the YWCA chaired the actual Forum, which was hosted at the Copenhagen University Amager Campus. The success of developing transnational networks of women was evident in the expansion of attendees at the NGO Tribune from 6000 participants in Mexico City to around 8000 in Copenhagen. Many complained of the inadequacy of the forum facilities, including the fact that child care had not been considered. The forum was split into small sessions consisting of around 200 meetings per day. Because of the lack of translators, and the fact that conferences were labeled as of concern to developed or developing nations, in-depth discussion was difficult and often barely touched the surface of issues. Peggy Antrobus and Charlotte Bunch, with sponsorship from the University of the West Indies' Women and Development Department and the Asian Pacific Centre for Women and Development (APCWD), recently relocated from Tehran to Bangkok, organized an orientation video Feminist Strategies for the Decade which was shown daily. Irene Tinker

The politicization of the official conference also influenced the NGO Tribune, resulting in tensions and displays of nationalism, such as Iranian women holding a news conference to celebrate their revolution by calling for the use of the hijab as a protest against colonialism and Ukrainian women protesting for independence. When Nawal El Saadawi of Egypt presented a paper on female circumcision, western feminists were advised that the issue was a developing world problem and not their concern. Lesbians attendees hosted five workshops, which were well attended and less controversial than at the 1975 conference. Some of the prominent women attendees were Shulamit Aloni of Israel; Marie Assaad of Egypt; Charlotte Bunch, US lesbian activist; Phyllis Chesler a US expert on refugees; Betty Friedan, founder of the National Organization for Women (NOW); Natalia Malakhovskaia, Soviet exile; Marie-Angélique Savané of Senegal. As they had in Mexico City, the members of the Forum continued the tradition of presenting their additions to the Programme of Action at the official session. A group of women led by Domitila Barrios de Chungara were met by police and barred from entering the plenary meeting until Lucille Mair met with them and allowed the recommendations to be presented.

== Outcomes ==
The most significant outcome of the conference was the official signing of CEDAW by the delegates at the opening ceremony. The conference adopted the official World Programme of Action with a vote of ninety-four favorable votes, twenty-two abstentions, and four opposed—Australia, Canada, Israel and the United States. It included sections to create women's bureaus or agencies, defined the roles of NGO and grassroots organizations, and established target issues countries were to monitor. Those issues included child care, households headed by women, migrants, rural women, unemployment, and youth. The Programme also included a section regarding water insecurity, but the most significant changes to the previous Plan of Action were sections devoted to ensuring equal access to education, employment opportunities, and adequate health care. The Conference established the Third World Conference on Women for the end of the decade to be hosted in Nairobi, Kenya in 1985 with a backup location in Tokyo.

The conference was seen by those who rejected the Programme as having been a failed process. Rather than a serious discussion of the inequalities between men and women, the conference had limited discussion to politicizing international events, ideological principals and controversies, which obscured the real needs of women to participate in decision-making and economic development, and benefit equally in family matters, health, education and employment. Multiple countries which had abstained from voting expressed disappointment that the process, rather than dealing with women's issues, had duplicated work better suited for the General Assembly.

Overall, the conference and forum conference were marred by conflict and politicization of international and national events which had little to do with women's issues. The official agenda was obscured by nationalist causes pitting the developing countries of the South and the developed countries of the North against each other. A huge portrait of Ayatollah Khomeini, Iran’s Islamist anti-feminist leader, decorated the Copenhagen conference headquarters, inside of which attacks on Israel, Jews, and America intensified. Most Third World delegates decided sexism was a Western problem, because only Western women complained about it. The question for continued participation in the conferences left many asking if the focus could be shifted away from political issues and return to the problems related to women: aging; credit for economic development; double duties between work and family; fertility versus infertility; shortage of heat and inadequate water, support systems and lack of them; women’s health; and violence against women.
