= Leila Sheikh =

Tanzanian journalist

- Died: 2023
- Citizenship: Tanzania
- Occupation: Journalist

Leila Sheikh or Sheikh-Hashim (died 2023) was a Tanzanian journalist, women's rights activist and blogger. She was a founder member of Tanzania Media Women's Association (TAMWA) and became TAMWA's Executive Director in 1996.

== Life ==
Leila Sheikh was one of the founder members of TAMWA in 1987, and later documented TAMWA's history. She was editor of TAMWA's magazine, Sauti ya Siti [Women's Voice]. In 1992, she oversaw a special issue on violence against women, with funding from the Swedish International Development Agency.

Sheikh was a TEDxDar speaker in November 2011. Though no longer Executive Director of TAMWA, she remained active as a women's rights activist in Dar es Salaam. She owned a consultancy firm, Studio Calabash Ltd, which designed lobbying strategies and public education programmes. She also worked as a media producer and scriptwriter.

== Death ==
Leila Sheikh died on 11 June 2023.

== Works ==
- (with Anna Gabba) Ukatili dhidi ya wanawake mkoani Dar es Salaam : ushahidi katika wilaya tatu, Ilala, Temeke na Kinondoni [Violence against women in Dar es Salaam region: evidence from three districts, Ilala, Temeke and Kinondoni]. Dar es Salaam, Tanzania : Chama cha Waandishi wa Habari Wanawake Tanzania, 1990.
- A survey of sexual harassment in Dar es Salaam, [Dar-es-Salaam] : The Association, 1990.
- 'Violence against Women is a Violation of Human Rights', Sauti ya Siti (November 1992), pp. 3–10
- The rights of women in Islam. Dar es Salaam: Tanzania Media Women's Association, 1996.
- 'TAMWA: Leila's Song – Supporting Women in Tanzania, in Hope Bagyendera Chigudu, ed. (2002). Composing a New Song: Stories of Empowerment from Africa. Commonwealth Secretariat. pp. 95–. ISBN 978-1-77922-015-8.
