= Helga Hörz =

German Marxist philosopher

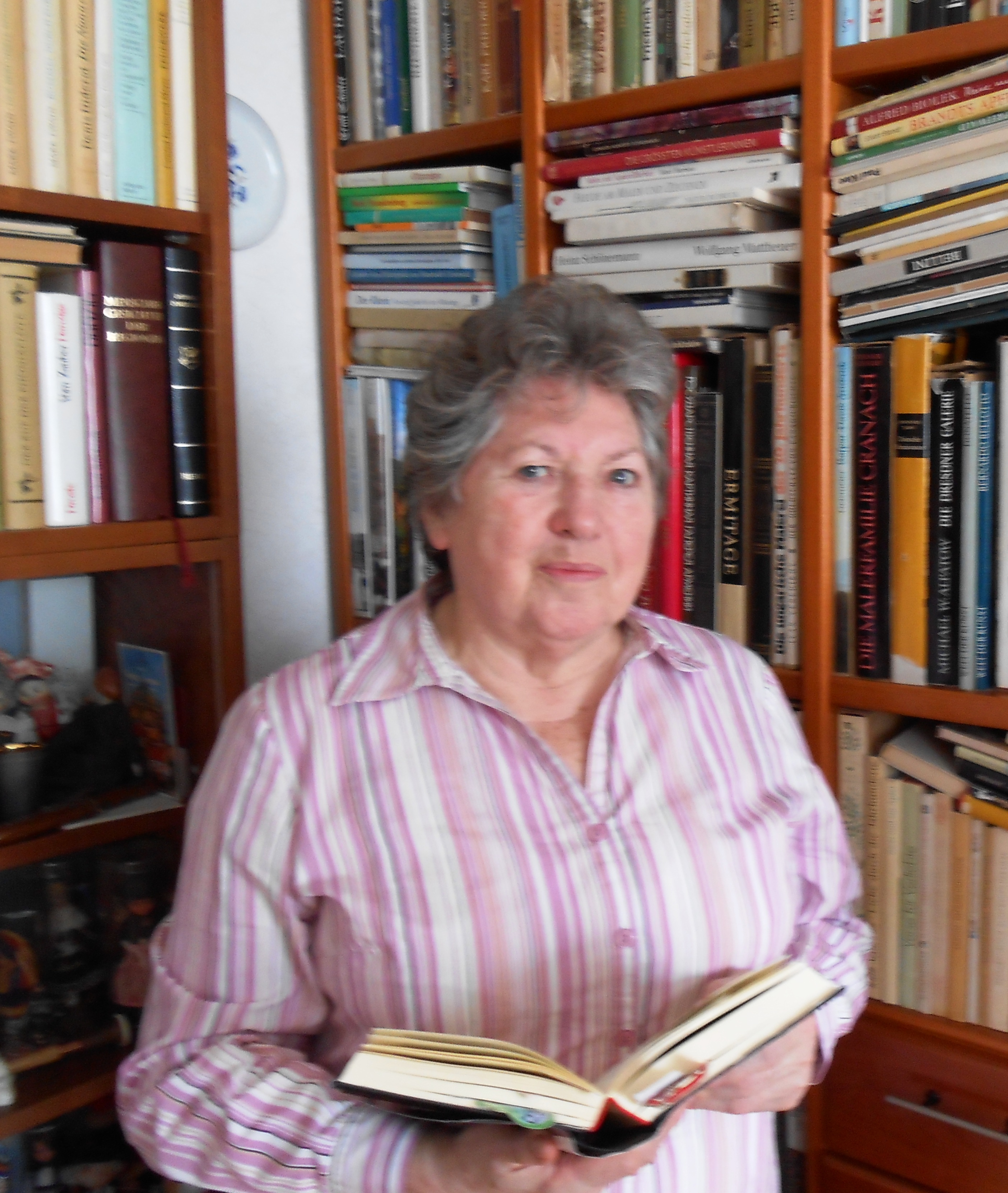
- Born: Helga Erika Ivertowski; 27 July 1935 (age 91); Free City of Danzig
- Occupations: Philosopher, activist, writer
- Spouse: Herbert Hörz
- Children: 3
- Parent(s): Paul and Maria Ivertowski

Helga Hörz (born Helga Ivertowski, 27 July 1935) is a German Marxist philosopher and women's rights activist. Before 1990 she was a university teacher of Ethics in the Philosophy Department at the Humboldt University in (East) Berlin. She was persuaded to retire on health grounds in October 1990, but in the words of one headline writer slightly less than twenty years later, this has left her "winding down, but not muzzled" ("Abgewickelt, aber nicht mundtot").

== Life ==
Formative childhood experiences

"... after German troops arrived in my home city [as Germany launched the invasion of Poland in 1939] I understood what it means to be a second class German. (The repetition of that experience in 1990 as former citizen of East Germany was painful.) As the assault on the Soviet Union was thrown into reverse [after 1942] and nothing was to be left behind except burned soil, those of us who lived [as children in Danzig] were simply "unnecessary ballast". As a nine year old I was burying dead bodies. My father was arrested in 1938 and sentenced to a life sentence by a Freisler court. When the allies released him he was in a death camp. These life experiences formed my antifascist conviction"

"... erfuhr ich nach dem Einmarsch deutscher Truppen in die Heimatstadt, was es bedeutet, Deutscher 2. Klasse zu sein. (Schmerzlich war die Wiederholung 1990 als nun ehemalige DDR-Bürgerin.) Als der gegen die Sowjetunion geführte Angriffskrieg zurückkehrte und nur verbrannte Erde übrigbleiben sollte, waren wir als Einwohner „unnötiger Ballast“. Ich begrub als Neunjährige Leichen. Mein Vater wurde 1938 verhaftet und vom Freisler-Gericht zu lebenslanger Haft verurteilt. Die Alliierten befreiten ihn aus dem Todeslager. Lebenserfahrungen prägten so meine antifaschistische Überzeugung. "

Helga Hörz 2007

=== Family provenance and early years ===
Helga Erika Ivertowski was born, the younger of the two daughters of Paul and Maria Ivertowski, in Danzig. Her father worked on the docks as a crane operator. He was also an anti-government activist, and one of a group arrested in 1938 (or 1939) and detained on account of "antifascist activities" (in the phrase favoured by East German sources). The detainees faced trial at the special people's court in Berlin in 1940. Four group members were sentenced to death. Paul Ivertowski was sentenced to imprisonment for life and spent the war years at the concentration camps in Dachau and, later, Mauthausen, from where he was released by US troops in May 1945. Her mother was left to bring up their daughters in wartime Danzig where in 1942 she started school. Caught up in the ethnic cleansing of 1944/45 Maria Ivertowski and her daughters struggled to make their way towards the west, ending up in Nauen, a short distance to the west of Berlin and after May 1945 in the part of Germany administered as the Soviet occupation zone. It was here that the family were reunited with their father, although the marriage of Paul and Maria Ivertowski later ended in divorce.

=== Further education and marriage ===
She grew up and completed her schooling in Nauen. In October 1949 the Soviet occupation zone was relaunched as the Soviet sponsored German Democratic Republic (East Germany) Passing her school final exams (Abitur) opened the way to university-level education, and she progressed to Berlin's Humboldt University (HUB) where she studied Philosophy, Ethics and Psychology. In 1954, still aged only 19, she married fellow philosophy student Herbert Hörz. The marriage would produce three recorded children and seven grandchildren (February 2010).

=== Light bulbs and the return to university ===
After completing her first degree she became active as a trades union official (3rd secretary for agitation and propaganda) in youth work while working between 1957 and 1959, in the huge "Narva" (as the company would later be known) light bulb plant in East Berlin. Sources indicate that she would have preferred, as her husband had done, to continue with her academic career, but - despite her husband's support - as a newly married woman with young children this possibility was not immediately open to her even in East Germany where, for economic and demographic reasons, female participation in the overall workforce was far higher than in West Germany. The light bulb plant was only a few steps from the (at this stage still porous) border with West Berlin. As a union activist within the plant she campaigned powerfully, both against the endless bureaucratic restrictions on how workers might benefit from the potential economic opportunities this presented by the border, and against workplace gender discrimination. She then worked and 1959/60 as a teaching assistant at the "Bruno Leuschner" Economics Academy in Berlin-Karlshorst which gave her the opportunity to take an academic approach to analysing women's social position. During the early 1960s she was able, as a post-graduate student to resume her association with the Humboldt.

She received her doctorate, for which she was supervised by Hermann Ley, in 1965. Her dissertation was entitled "Some of the philosophical-ethical problems in determining the role of women in society and applying equal rights" ("Einige philosophisch-ethische Probleme bei der Bestimmung der gesellschaftlichen Rolle der Frau und der Durchsetzung ihrer Gleichberechtigung"). It was later published as a book, with the snappier title "Woman as a person" ("Die Frau als Persönlichkeit"). The book was officially tolerated, but largely ignored. Between 1965 and 1969 she served as honorary (i.e. unpaid) of the Women's Commission on Trades Union Research at the Humboldt. Her habilitation (higher qualification) followed in 1974, setting her on course for an academic career. The theme of her work this time was "Personality, Morality and Ethical Education" ("Persönlichkeit, Moral und sittliche Erziehung").

=== As an establishment academic and ethicist ===
She was now appointed to a full professorship for Ethics at the Humboldt. She had already, in 1971, initiated the creation of the Department for Ethics as a division of the university's Section for Marxist–Leninist Philosophy. She later took over from Anneliese Griese, serving as Head of the Philosophy section between March 1987 and January 1990. Her successor in this position was Heinz Kuchling.

Additionally, during the early 1970s she was a member of the working group on "Problems of biological, psychological and social personality determination" with the East German Academy of Pedagogical Sciences. Between 1988 and 1990 she served as a member of the Philosophy Advisory Board and headed up the permanent "Ethics" working group at the East German Ministry for Higher and Vocational Education. As a member of the (East) German Academy of Sciences she served on various advisory bodies including the one on "Women in Socialist Society".

On the international stage Hörz served as a deputy council member with the Women's International Democratic Federation (WIDF), participating in its congresses at Helsinki, Berlin, Prague and Moscow and numerous international consultations and seminars, also taking part in a National Women's Conference in Bangladesh. She was involved in setting up consultative meetings and expert advice in the context of collaboration between the WIDF and the United Nations, also for many years representing East Germany in the United Nations Commission on the Status of Women.

Political developments during 1989 and the realisation after November of that year that the Soviet forces had no orders to the crush street protests violently, as they had in 1953 opened the way to German reunification which followed, formally, in October 1990. The East German style of Marxist philosophy was not a priority for the new Germany and Helga Hörz was persuaded to retire early, on health grounds at the prompting of East Germany's last Minister for Education, Hans Joachim Meyer. The world of East German philosophical did not so instantly cease to exist, however, and Hörz became the honorary (unpaid) leader for a series of events in the Berlin "Socio-cultural Contact Centre for Senior citizens" between 1992 and December 1994 and, from 1997, an advisory board member for the "Training Academy of the Berlin Regional Association for People's Solidarity". Between 1997 and 2011 she served for fifteen years as chair of the advisory board, responsible for organising academic presentations, reading sessions with authors and computer courses.

She published her memoires in 2009.

== United Nations ==
In 1975 Helga Hörz was elected to membership of the United Nations Commission on the Status of Women by the UN Economic and Social Council. She was involved in the Convention on the Elimination of All Forms of Discrimination Against Women, and introduced in 1979 a declaration "on the stronger inclusion of women in the fight for peace" which was adopted by the General Assembly in 1982 and, it has been suggested, incorporated in UN Resolution 1325.

Hörz participated in UN World Women's Conference (Copenhagen, Nairobi) and UN seminars (Groningen, Geneva, Vienna, Paris). She addressed gender problems in 1975 in London, at the 1977 UN seminar in Groningen and at the 1979 ECE "Time Management" seminar in Geneva. Within the UN she served as vice-chair for UN Commission day-sessions "On the status of women" in Vienna (1978) and New York (1979 and 1980). In March 1980, and again in 1990, she chaired a Vienna day session, and at the second UN World Women's Conference at Copenhagen in July 1980 she was first vice-chair "in charge of coordination".

As soon as East Germany ceased to exist as a separate state, which happened early in October 1990, Helga Hörz's role as an East German delegate at the United Nations meetings on women's issues came to an end.

== Awards and honours ==
- Honorary chair of the Women's Committee of the University Trades Union Leadership at the Humboldt (1968–1970)
- Member of the East German Peace Council
- Member of the East German Human Rights Committee
- Member of the Women's Commission of the Berlin SED (party) leadership ("Bezirksleitung")
- 1967 Johann Gottlieb Fichte prize for a doctoral dissertation (Humboldt)
- 1970 Clara Zetkin Medal
- 1985 Patriotic Order of Merit in bronze
- from 1990 board member with the German Freethinkers League

== Publications (selection) ==
- Einige philosophisch-ethische Probleme bei der Bestimmung der gesellschaftlichen Rolle der Frau und der Durchsetzung ihrer Gleichberechtigung. Dissertation, Humboldt-Universität, Berlin 15 December 1965.
- Die Frau als Persönlichkeit. Philosophische Probleme einer Geschlechterpsychologie. Unser Weltbild, Vol. 53. Deutscher Verlag der Wissenschaften, Berlin 1968, 2nd edition 1971.
- Persönlichkeit, Moral und sittliche Erziehung. Dissertation B (Habilitation), Humboldt-Universität, Berlin 1974 (vols. 1–2).
- Blickpunkt Persönlichkeit. Ein Beitrag der Ethik zu Theorie und Praxis der Persönlichkeitsentwicklung. Weltanschauung, Bd. 1. Deutscher Verlag der Wissenschaften, Berlin 1975.
- Ethische Probleme bei der Sexualerziehung Jugendlicher. In: H. Grassel, K. R. Bach (Hrsg.): Kinder- und Jugendsexualität. Deutscher Verlag der Wissenschaften, Berlin 1979, pp. 17–30.
- Eizelltransplantation beim Menschen als moralisches Problem. In: Medizin aktuell, Berlin 1983, S. 110–111.
- Ethische Positionen zur Homosexualität. In: Reiner Werner: Homosexualität. Verlag Volk und Gesundheit, Berlin 1987, S. 172–174.
- Frauenrechte sind Menschenrechte. Zur gesellschaftlichen Stellung der Frau in Deutschland. In: Gerhard Fischer u.a. (Hrsg.): Gegen den Zeitgeist. Zwei deutsche Staaten in der Geschichte. GNN Verlag, Schkeuditz 1999, pp. 224–235.
- Zur Evolution von Geschlechterrollen. In: Frau Musica heute. Musikakademie Rheinsberg 2005, pp. 23–33. ISBN 3-87350-031-0.
- Patriarchalische Machtstrukturen in philosophischer und psychologischer Auseinandersetzung. Forschungsinstitut der Internationalen Wissenschaftlichen Vereinigung Weltwirtschaft und Weltpolitik, Berichte 16 (2006) 163, pp. 7–27.
- Zwischen Uni und UNO – Zu meiner doppelten „Abwicklung“ 1990. Wir Frauen. 25. Jg. 2006, p. 11 ff. ISSN 0178-6083.
- Zwischen Uni und UNO. Erfahrungen einer Ethikerin. Reihe Autobiographien, vol. 37. trafo Verlagsgruppe Dr. Wolfgang Weist, Berlin 2009, 393 S., ISBN 978-3-89626-924-9.
- Der lange Weg zur Gleichberechtigung. Die DDR und ihre Frauen. trafo Verlagsgruppe Dr. Wolfgang Weist, Berlin 2010, 262 S., ISBN 978-3-89626-948-5.
- Ist Egoismus unmoralisch? Grundzüge einer neomodernen Ethik. trafo Verlagsgruppe Dr. Wolfgang Weist, Berlin 2013, 459 S., ISBN 978-3-86464-038-4 (with Herbert Hörz).
- Transhumanismus. Ist der zukünftige Mensch ein Avatar? In: Welf Schröter (Hrsg.): Identität in der Virtualität. Einblicke in neue Arbeitswelten und »Industrie 4.0« - Beiträge zum 60. Geburtstag eines Netzwerkers. Talheimer Verlag, Mössingen 2014, pp. 242–285 (with Herbert Hörz).
- Nehmen Drohnen im Informationszeitalter den Menschen ihre Verantwortung ab? In: Frank Fuchs-Kittowski; Werner Kriesel (Hrsg.): Informatik und Gesellschaft. Festschrift zum 80. Geburtstag von Klaus Fuchs-Kittowski. Peter Lang Internationaler Verlag der Wissenschaften, PL Academic Research, Frankfurt a. M.; Bern; Bruxelles; New York; Oxford; Warszawa; Wien 2016, ISBN 978-3-631-66719-4 (Print), E-ISBN 978-3-653-06277-9 (E-Book).

as compiler-editor

- Ethik. Deutscher Verlag der Wissenschaften, Berlin 1986, 2nd edition 1989, 250 pages., ISBN 3-326-00055-3 (together with Ursula Wilke).
- Lexikon der Humansexuologie. Verlag Volk und Gesundheit, Berlin 1990, 231, XLIV S., 133 Illustrations, ISBN 3-333-00410-0 (with Lykke Aresin, Hannes Hüttner and Hans Szewczyk).
