= World Conference on Women, 1985 =

UN human rights meeting in Nairobi, Kenya

The World Conference on Women, 1985 or the Third World Conference on Women took place between 15 and 26 July 1985 in Nairobi, Kenya to assess the progress and failure in implementing the goals for the United Nations Decade for Women, as established by the World Plan of Action from the 1975 inaugural conference on women and modified by the World Programme of Action of the second conference in 1980. Recognizing that the goals of the Decade for Women had not been met, the conference recommended and the General Assembly approved on-going evaluation of women's achievements and failures through the year 2000.

One significance of the conference was that its official statement, "Forward-looking Strategies for the Advancement of Women", was adopted by consensus, unlike the statements of the previous two conferences. The conference marked the first time that lesbian rights were introduced in a United Nations official meeting. It was also the turning-point for violence against women to emerge from being a hidden topic into one which needed to be addressed.

== History ==
In 1975, the United Nations approved the celebration of International Women's Year. As part of the celebrations they held the First World Conference on Women in 1975 in Mexico City. At that meeting, it was proposed that the following decade be proclaimed UN Decade for Women and follow-up meetings to assess progress be held in 1980 and 1985. The General Assembly adopted a World Plan of Action with recommended targets for governments to integrate women's equality, development and participation in peace initiatives. The mid-point meeting was held in Copenhagen, adding sections to the revised Programme of Action devoted to ensuring women equal access to education, employment opportunities, and adequate health care. Both of the previous conferences had struggled with the divide caused by Cold War politics and the needs of the developing world. The geopolitical backdrop entering into the third conference was still contentious with a worldwide debt crisis soaring in Africa and Latin America, protectionist policies under Margaret Thatcher and Ronald Reagan causing widespread uncertainty, stagnation of the USSR, the arms race build up, and the Soviet invasion of Afghanistan. The question would be whether the conference could remain focused on women's issues in the face of Soviet accusations that the United States imperialistic and war mongering tactics were undermining the goals of the Decade for Women and the US concerns that the Eastern Bloc attempts at politicization would derail any real improvement in the unique problems faced by women.

== Official conference ==
The 1985 Conference held from 15 and 26 July in Nairobi, Kenya was the final review of the decade and was led by conference president Margaret Kenyatta. Leticia Shahani, widowed mother of three children and a Philippine diplomat served as the Secretary-General and made the crucial suggestion that off-the-record discussion by delegates would decrease the polarity which had plagued the previous conferences and would allow a more open discussion and lead to compromise. There were 157 countries represented with around 1,400 official delegates, including such prominent delegates as: Phoebe Asiyo of Kenya; Ylva Ericsson of Sweden; Saida Hassan of Djibouti; Elena Lagadinova of Bulgaria; Carolyn McAskie an official at the Canadian International Development Agency; Maureen O'Neill head of the Canadian delegation, who was the coordinator for the Minister of Status of Women; Maureen Reagan, daughter of the US president; Yvette Roudy, the French Minister of Women's Rights; Jean Spautz of Luxembourg; Tom Vraalsen of Norway; among others.

After opening remarks by Javier Pérez de Cuéllar, Secretary-General of the United Nations, Kenyan President Daniel arap Moi welcomed participants, expressing his hope that the conference would prove successful and that the objectives for women would not be obscured by distractions. Opening remarks by Margaret Kenyatta on the history of the conference were followed by the general discussion. The general session discussed that women ought to be able to live securely under conditions which granted them equality and justice, but there was a recognition that time is required to change traditional views and make people aware of needed change. It was noted that though legal equality had significantly improved, the disparity between the legal reality and practice was still broad. It was discussed that political tension and instability, as well as conflict added to curtailment of advancement, as did colonialism, racism, and economic stagnation. The conference noted gains in developed nations for parity of education, but significant gaps in girls education versus boys education in developing nations, which impacted future employment options as well. Though some progress had been made on women's employment, it was noted that wage gaps, higher unemployment for women than men, and child care services all contributed to women's instability. As for health, it was acknowledged that as women were typically the health care providers for their families, that more effort must be made to ensure that women were healthy to allow them to continue to serve their families. Inadequate education and health facilities, combined with high birth rates and customs or laws that allowed women to control their own fertility were continuing issues.

Projects throughout the decade had drawn awareness to the need to advance women's opportunities and statistic gathering had improved to measure their progress or lack of advancement. Violence against women was a prevalent problem as was the insecurity of indigenous women, elderly women, migrant and refugee women and their children, and rural women. Water and food uncertainty needed to be addressed as women in many areas devoted the majority of their time into unpaid labors to maintain their families. Many UN programs had been expanded over the Decade for Women to incorporate women into their development programs, though it was noted that in general women's participation, and even employment in UN agencies though improved was still below targets. Programs directed at agriculture, economics, children, development, housing, health, technology and many others were examined and overall, improvement had been made in the inclusion of women's access. However, it was noted that making provisions for equality was not the same as attaining real equal opportunity. It was agreed that the cultural role in maintaining sexism and sex stereotypes was a complex issue which would involve dedicated effort to change school curricula and transform media messaging to enable women real access to socio-economic, cultural, legal and political parity. It was noted that for the first time, lesbian rights were introduced at an official UN conference by the Dutch delegate, Annelien Kappeyne van de Coppello.

The first committee, under the chair Cecilia López of Colombia, with vice-chairs, Kulsum Saifullah of Pakistan, Olimpia Solomonescu of Romania, and Laetitia van den Assum of the Netherlands, with Rapporteur Diaroumeye Gany of Niger, discussed the first three chapters of the draft Forward-looking Strategies for the Advancement of Women. The second committee, under the chair Rosario Manalo of the Philippines, with vice-chairs, Dame Billie Miller of Barbados, Konjit SineGiorgis of Ethiopia, and Eva Szilagyi of Hungary, with Rapporteur Helen Ware of Australia, discussed the remaining chapters of the Strategies. Both committees recommended approving the draft and a discussion with the general session followed with a line by line review of the document. Though both committees evaluated a number of draft resolutions, there was inadequate time for the general session to review the resolutions and no formal action was taken upon them.

== Forum ==
Dame Nita Barrow of Barbados chaired and organized the Forum, with the assistance of Edith Ballantyne, president of the United Nations' Conference of Non-governmental Organizations (CONGO). It was attended by more than 15,000 people, of which 60% were representatives from non-industrialized nations, and was held at the University of Nairobi. Unlike the facilities in Copenhagen, in Kenya, a kindergarten was set up for delegates' children. A Peace Tent was set up on the lawn of the university and hosted sessions about conflict and its impact of war on women. Among prominent attendees were: Charlotte Bunch, a US lesbian activist; Betty Friedan, founder of the National Organization for Women (NOW); Eddah Gachukia head of the Kenyan NGO committee; and others.

In addition to the basic themes of the official session, the Forum was asked to address issues concerning women who were poor, elderly, migrant or refugees, youth and address women in media. Round table discussions, workshops and two plenary sessions were established. The array of topics discussed in formal and impromptu meetings was vast, including such topics as childcare; consumer education; credit; family planning; female genital mutilation; the growth of women's studies; legal rights; literacy; media portrayals of women; motherhood and development programs for families; political prisoners; prostitution; systemic discrimination against women; violence; women and development; women and religion; women and technology; as well as lesbian workshops and many other topics in some 1200 workshops scheduled throughout the duration of the conference. The lesbian workshops were the "first public discussion of lesbianism in Kenya" and resulted in a lesbian press conference in which it was acknowledged that lesbianism wasn't a Westernized concept, but instead effected women's rights throughout the globe. It also resulted in a proposal from one of the Dutch representatives for lesbian rights to be addressed in the official conference documents. In a workshop on development, Helen Safa brought forward the idea that "Gender and Development" (GAD) should replace the former strategy "Women in Development" (WID) used by the United Nations Commission on the Status of Women (CSW). This mirrored the NGO, Development Alternatives with Women for a New Era (DAWN)'s belief that WID simply tried to insert women into existing systems without reducing or changing their paternal nature. They recommended that GAD, a strategic long-term planning method, become the new standard, which focused on designing systems specifically related to women and their growth.

In addition to the workshops, the United Nations Environment Programme's (UNEP) Senior Women Advisors, Margaret Kenyatta; Ms. Hawa Aden of Somalia; Mrs. Victoria Chitepo, Minister of Environment, Zimbabwe; Dr. Shafika Nasser, member, upper house of parliament in Egypt; Dr. Eideh M. Mutlag Qanah, Advisor to the Queen of Jordan; Hedia Bacca, environmental activist in Tunisia; Margarita Marina de Botero, environmental leader in Columbia; Yolanda Kakabadse, environmental leader in Ecuador; the Hon. Sheila Dikshit, Member of the Parliament, India; Ms. Soepardjo Roestam, wife of the Prime Minister of Indonesia and leader of the Family Welfare Service; Ms. Veronica Villavicencio, of the Philippines; H.R.H Khunying (Lady) A. Meesook, Thailand; Lt. Col. Christine Deborah, Minister of Natural Resources, Ghana (a graduate of Sandhurst, UK); Ms. Eva Szilagyi, Hungary; Fiona McConnell, British Foreign Ministry; Aira Kalela, Environment/Foreign Affairs Ministry, Finland; the notable Madame Simone Veil, France; the Hon. Claudine Schneider, (R. Rhode Island) U.S. Congress; and Wangari Maathai, founder of the Greenbelt Movement in Kenya hosted an evening program the night prior to conference opening, to promote the inclusion of women in solving environmental problems, and women were invited to participate in a number of cultural events like the Nairobi Film Forum which showed films and videos by and about women and gave workshops; exhibitions of art and photography; folklore workshops; concerts; martial arts classes; field trips to local villages. Because of the favorable climate conditions, women were able to gather in the open-air for a variety of both scheduled and unscheduled functions to build networks with other participants. The Forum after 1985 shifted in a way that reflected the divide between progressivism versus conservatism, as opposed to the polarized capitalist-socialist divide which had split prior conferences. It was recognized by the participants that global problems were women's issues, but that within their governmental systems, there was either a desire to promote or curtail change. A fundamental shift occurred which recognized that no matter the system, women were subordinate and that promoting a world view from women's perspectives allowed them to transcend their differences and focus on the commonalities they shared. For example, aboriginal women recognized that where ever they were from, they battled for indigenous land rights; Arab and Israeli women discussed the need for peace; women lawyers whether from Islamic countries in South Asia or Catholic countries in Latin America recognized the struggle for women's rights under patriarchal religious systems.

== Outcomes ==
Forward-looking Strategies for the Advancement of Women was adopted by consensus because of a strategy developed which allowed delegates to express reservations on the basis of individual paragraphs, rather than of the document as a whole. Because of stronger transnational relationships had been forged by the previous two conferences increased understanding by governments of the needs of their women constituents, a willingness of donors to help women integrate into development and increased effectiveness of NGOs in their activism, the list of topics covered in the Strategies was more extensive, including topics such as: agriculture, communications, constitutional and legal issues, education, employment, energy needs, environmental and water concerns, food security, health, housing, science and technology, social services, social and political equality as well as increased participation. The major themes development, equality, and peace were retained as were focuses on racism and refugees. The document endorsed new strategies moving to the year 2000 and replaced the words Apartheid and Zionism with the more general term racism, to maintain the focus on women rather than polarizing issues.

Out of the conference forum, several women's groups emerged that would become influential: Asian-Pacific Forum on Women, Law and Development (APWLD), Comité de América Latina y El Caribe para la Defensa de los Derechos de la Mujer (CLADEM), Women in Law and Development in Africa (WILDAF), and the Tanzania Media Women's Association. These were indicative of the types of exponential growth in NGOs dealing with women and their issues which were founded after the conference ended. Many of the organizations were information-sharing groups which pooled their resources and strategies to create innovative solutions. These networks, shifted the flow of activism and scholarship from the global North toward the Southern hemispheres and from top-down social structures to those which forge coalitions across cultural, racial and social boundaries. The conference also marked a turning point in the silence regarding violence against women, which would ultimately lead to the passage of the Declaration on the Elimination of Violence Against Women in 1993. Since the objectives of the Decade for Women had not achieved the goals set out in 1975, the United Nations General Assembly made a decision after Nairobi to conduct world surveys on women every five years in a continuing effort to follow-up on the implementation of the Strategies for women. One of the most important outcomes was moving women out of obscurity and establishing specific mechanisms for measuring women's progress.
