= Iola Leal Riesco =

Spanish environmental activist (born 1977)

Iola Leal Riesco (born 4 July 1977) is a Spanish environmental and social activist working for European Forest Institute and Well Grounded. Her educational background is in the field of forest and human ecology. Since 2003 she has been working to help solve the challenges of integrating environmental issues into EC Aid policies and improve governance in forests globally. Her work continues to center upon EU policies as well as following closely the EU action plan for Forest Law Enforcement, Governance and Trade. In 2010, she set up with Cath Long the organisation Well Grounded, which provides services and support to African civil society organisations working with communities to help them assert their rights and to improve forest governance.

Born in the city of Lugo, she worked for FERN, Amazonia Assemblea de Solidaritat, Skamot Verd and Asociación pola defensa da ría, prior to joining EFI. Her M.Sc. degree in Biology is from the University of Barcelona.

== Works ==
- From a European Court of Auditors’ Report to a learning process? The challenge to integrate the environment into the European Community’s development assistance Olearius A, Leal Riesco I & Nicholson S (2008)
- Transparency and availability of EC aid documentation, a review. Nicholson S & Leal Riesco I (2007) FERN-WWF-BirdLife Report, September 2007.
- Provoking change - A toolkit for African NGOs. Saskia Ozinga and Iola Leal Riesco (2007)
- Integrating environmental issues in the next round of co-operation agreements between the EU and ACP countries Leal Riesco I. FERN's EC Forest Platform Briefing Note Issue 04, June 2006
- Rautio, Pasi; Markkola, Annamari; Martel, Jocelyn; Tuomi, Juha; Harma, Esa; Kuikka, Karita; Siitonen, Annika; Riesco, Iola Leal; Roitto, Marja (2002). "Developmental plasticity in birch leaves: defoliation causes a shift from glandular to nonglandular trichomes". Oikos. 98 (3): 437–446. doi:10.1034/j.1600-0706.2002.980308.x. ISSN 0030-1299.
- Women and Environment still run behind. Leal Riesco I. (2003) Phoenix magazine, July: European Constitution Pg. 40.
- Economic Impact of transgenics in the Agro-food industry. Leal Riesco I (2003) EU Council, internal report.
- Forest loss and human health: focus on EU policies and practices Leal Riesco I (2005) FERN Briefing Note, Brussels.
- Muller, Natureza e Tecnoloxía Leal Riesco I (2001). XVIII Galician Philosophy Week: Philosophy and Technology, Pontevedra. Aula Castelao de Filosofía & Vigo University.
- Enginyeria genètica... ¿sense fronteres? Sergi Rodríguez Tohà, Eulàlia Gassó i Miracle i Iola Leal Riesco. Ecoilla nº12, Pg.1-4, December 1997 & Boletín nº 9 de la Xarxa de Consum Solidari de Barcelona, December 1998]
