= Characters of Persona 2 =

Characters of Persona 2 may refer to:

- Characters of Persona 2: Innocent Sin
- Characters of Persona 2: Eternal Punishment
