= Elizabeth Palmer (activist) =

American activist

- Born: April 17, 1913; Manhattan, New York, United States
- Died: October 4, 2014 (aged 101); Claremont, California, United States

Elizabeth Palmer (April 17, 1913 - October 4, 2014) was an American activist who worked for the World YWCA. A native New Yorker, she started working for the US YWCA in New York City in 1935 and later became the General Secretary of the YWCA in Manchester before moving to the World YWCA in 1945. She became General Secretary of the World YWCA in 1955 and retired in 1978. Palmer worked to help women and girls around the globe and guided the World YWCA to take leadership and create international discussions on the status of women. In 1980 Palmer chaired the NGO Forum at the Second UN World Conference on Women in Copenhagen, Denmark and attempted to expand the diversity of voices heard at the conference.

== Early life and education ==
Elizabeth Palmer was born in New York City to Elizabeth and Embury Palmer. Palmer attended the Masters School at Dobbs Ferry and later earned a degree in religious education from Columbia University in New York.

== Career ==
In 1935 Palmer began working with the US YWCA in New York City, and in 1941 and 1942 she worked for the YWCA USO program in southern Connecticut. In 1942 she became General Secretary of the YWCA of Manchester, Great Britain. In 1945 she joined World YWCA staff as Youth Secretary and in 1946 she organized a conference of young leaders and members of the YWCAs of Europe, the first after World War II ended. After attending the YWCA World's Council meeting in Hangzhou, China in 1947, she was World YWCA Secretary for South and East Asia from 1948 to 1951. Palmer was recommended for this position by Sosa Matthew, National General Secretary of the YWCA of India, Burma, and Ceylon, with the praise that the people of India liked Elizabeth Palmer. In her first year, she traveled to 10 different countries in that region, building networks. Next she worked in the World YWCA office in Geneva, Switzerland as Secretary for Interpretation and Finance, and in 1955 Palmer was appointed General Secretary of the World YWCA, where she worked with the board to set global policy for the organization. She also oversaw the staff in Geneva, traveled to many international conferences and meetings, and served on CONGO committees (Conference of Non-Governmental Organizations in Consultative Relationship with the United Nations) and on other NGOs based in Geneva.

Palmer retired from the role of General Secretary in 1978. Her long tenure and accomplishments drew praise from people, including Athena Athanassiou (World YWCA president) from Greece, who commented that she helped to decolonize the World YWCA as women from around the world worked together, partnered on issues, and also struggled along the way in these difficult changes. She was known as a natural leader with an open mind and a mind for finance as well as for justice. She enabled other women to take leadership roles, and established closer links with the growing number of national YWCA associations.

In 1979 Palmer was asked to lead the Planning Committee for NGO Activities at the World Conference of the UN Decade for Women, and in 1980 she chaired the NGO Forum at the Copenhagen Mid-Decade Conference.

=== The 1980 NGO Forum at the Second U.N. Conference on Women ===
The 1980 Forum took place as part of the Second World Conference of the UN Decade for Women in Copenhagen. Elizabeth Palmer was selected by Edith Ballantyne, board president of CONGO and member of the Women's International League for Peace and Freedom to be chair of the NGO Forum planning committee. Palmer's responsibilities included raising funds for expenses ($470,000), coordinating with the Danish National Council of Women for volunteers, and coordinating how the forum will work with the many NGOs. Planning meetings were open to all NGO participating in the conference, and 34 participated.

Through her longtime work with the World YWCA, an organization known for focusing on women's rights and the education of girls, Palmer had developed connections in the UN and was well known in the global feminist community, so she chaired the NGO forum. Each of the three UN Conferences on Women had NGO forums chaired by women from the World YWCA (Mildred Persinger, Elizabeth Palmer and Nita Barrow). The choice of having Palmer, a white, Christian, American, well-educated, middle-class woman chair the international forum, and perhaps have too much influence in the conversations, was not without criticism.

Palmer learned from some of the feedback of the forum at World Conference on Women, 1975 that took place in Mexico. Aiming to make the 1980 forum more participatory and flexible, she provided programing but also allowed for more spontaneous programming to occur. She asked the International Women's Tribune Centre (IWTC) to start networking activities and a networking center, which became Vivencia!, a networking and flexible workshop space within the forum that also became central for Spanish speaking women in attendance. The women from IWTC who helped lead in this effort were Anne S. Walker, Vicki Semler, and Vicky Mejia. Over 8,000 people participated in the forum, representing 128 countries, and 150-175 workshops, panels, and meetings were held each day, bringing a diverse experience to each attendee, and according to some sources, making it difficult to report on what the experience was for the women in attendance. Palmer and her committee provided funding and minimal structure so the participants could take the lead.

Despite some criticism, it is acknowledged that the three forums at the UN conferences on women, including the one in 1980, generally influenced the UN to address women's needs, spreading awareness and conversation about the global status of women well past the 1980s.

Palmer was recognized by the United Nations as one of only three women on their list of one hundred people who helped build the UN.

== Later life ==
After 1980, Elizabeth Palmer stayed active in the YWCA World Service Council. In a 1987 article about a World YWCA meeting in Phoenix, Arizona where 700 women from 72 countries met, she was quoted describing how the YWCA had grown to understand that women need a sense of self reliance and control locally to effect change. She added that women can make a difference when they understand what structural issues are happening in their communities. Palmer moved to Pilgrim Place, a senior community in Claremont, California, in 1988, where she died in 2014.
