= Elena Lagadinova =

Bulgarian agronomist, genetic engineer, and politician

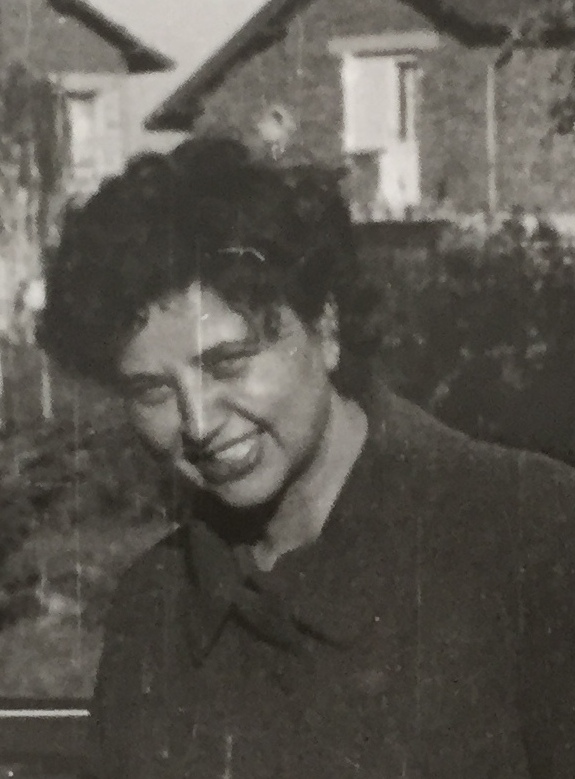
Elena Lagadinova

Elena Atanasova Lagadinova (Bulgarian: Елена Атанасова Лагадинова; May 9, 1930 – October 29, 2017) was a Bulgarian agronomist, genetic engineer, and politician.

During the Second World War, Lagadinova contributed to the Bulgarian resistance against German occupation, earning the nickname “Амазонка” or “The Amazon.” She was the youngest female fighter in Bulgaria, beginning her contributions to the war effort at 11 years old and actively fighting at age 14.

Following the Allied victory in 1945, she pursued a PhD in agrobiology, before serving as a research scientist at the Bulgarian Academy of Sciences. There, she developed a new strain of wheat, Triticale, which helped to boost the productivity of collective farms. For this discovery, she was awarded the Order of Cyril and Methodius by the Bulgarian Government.

In 1968, Lagadinova accepted the position as Secretary of the Fatherland Front and President of the Committee of the Bulgarian Women's Movement. In these roles, she played a significant role in the creation and enforcement of legislation to benefit women in the workplace, including maternity leave laws. She was also a notable figure in global politics, working with other international activists to forge a coalition of national women's organisations, and becoming a member of the United Nations International Research and Training Institute for the Advancement of Women in 1985.

She died on October 29, 2017, in a retirement facility in Sofia, Bulgaria.

== Early life ==
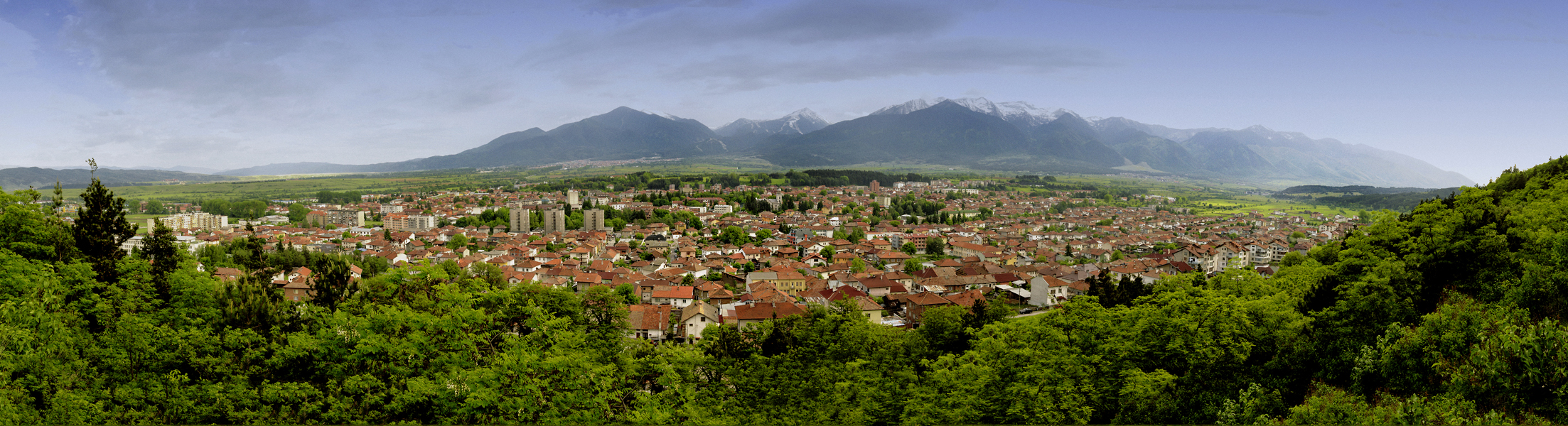
Razlog, Bulgaria, where Elena Lagadinova was born. The Pirin Mountains, where she escaped to in 1944, are visible in the distance.

Lagadinova was born in the mountain town of Razlog, Bulgaria in 1930. She came from a low-income background and lost her mother at the age of four. Her father raised her and her two brothers. In her early life, she was surrounded by discussion of the revolution and political commitment; Lagadinova's father was an early supporter of the Bulgarian Communist Party, while her oldest brother had fled to the Soviet Union to pursue work in the Communist International. Lagadinova experienced the Second World War as part of her family's struggle; all contributed to the fight against fascism in her native Razlog. Early in the war, she protected the identities of her brothers and concealed the partisan actions of her father. She also helped supply nearby villages with necessary resources. At fourteen, Lagadinova committed herself to becoming a freedom fighter with her father and brothers, making her one of the youngest partisans to fight in her region at the time.

== World War II ==
Bulgaria was allied with the Nazis during World War II. In 1941 Bulgaria passed the “Law for the Protection of the Nation,” which eliminated the civil rights of Bulgarian Jews. In 1941, Bulgaria also supported the Germans in the invasion of the Balkans, occupied most of Eastern Yugoslavia, and deported up to 20,000 Jews from their occupied territories. Elena Lagadinova's entire family, and much of the resistance fighting against the Nazis at the time, were Communists. In 1944, the Bulgarian monarchy sent the gendarmerie to eliminate the partisan threat and showed up at her family home in Razlog with grenades. She managed to escape to the Pirin Mountains.

Lagadinova started fighting on active duty during the summer of 1944 and became the youngest female partisan fighter in Bulgaria during World War II. Having contributed to resistance activities against the Nazi-allied Bulgarian government at eleven years old, she was by the age of fourteen fighting alongside her brothers. Lagadinova also served as an iatak, assistant to the partisan network, delivering messages to her family members and others during the war. In this capacity Lagadinova was exposed to greater danger, since as an iatak she was based in the cities and had a greater chance of getting caught and killed. While Lagadinova survived, her brother Assen was captured and decapitated by the gendarmerie during the war.

She became known as “The Amazon” (Амазонка). During and after the war, posters and propaganda slogans were made based on her image. She earned her nickname through her courage and tenacity in fighting. From Sofia to Moscow, children's magazines praised her courage and strength, urging boys and girls to “be brave like the Amazon."

After the Allied victory in 1945, Lagadinova was sent to the Soviet Union to complete her education. She studied at the Timiryazev Academy in Moscow, (formally named the Moscow Agricultural Institute) considered to be the “oldest internationally renowned institute in Russia.” There she earned a doctoral degree in biology.

== Contributions to plant genetics ==
Following the end of the war, Lagadinova pursued a PhD in agrobiology at the Timiryazev Academy in Moscow and conducted additional research in England and Sweden. She returned to Sofia to work in agricultural genetics at the Bulgarian Academy of Sciences. During her thirteen years as a research scientist, she helped develop a new robust hybrid strand of wheat Triticale, which helped boost the productivity of collective farms. In 1959, the Bulgarian government awarded Lagadinvoa Order of Saints Cyril and Methodius to recognize her achievements in the field of plant genetics.

== Political career ==
In the late 1960s a Party cadre assigned to oversee Lagadinova's work attempted to politically influence the Bulgarian Academy of Science's research program, an action that prompted Lagadinova to write a letter to Soviet Premier Leonid Brezhnev. In her letter, she raised concerns over the Party cadre's lack of technical expertise, which interfered with her research efforts. Her letter was intercepted by Todor Zhivkov, the General Secretary of the Bulgarian Communist Party. In 1968, Lagadinova was made Secretary of the Fatherland Front and president of the Committee of the Bulgarian Women's Movement.

The Bulgarian Politburo wished to promote education to ensure the incorporation of women into the formal labour market. The country passed laws that supported the formal training of women in many previously male dominated fields such as engineering, and reduced women's dependence on men by legalizing abortion services and relaxing divorce laws. By 1965, Bulgaria was projected to have the world's greatest percentage of women in the paid workforce. These policies resulted in a decrease in the birth rate, which raised concerns about the state's future supply of labour. The state believed that Lagadinova's background in science would aid the state in devising a solution to the declining population. Many government officials began to consider outlawing abortion, as neighboring Romania had done, in order to boost the birth rate.

In order to gather data for this project, Lagadinova led the Committee of the Bulgarian Women's Movement (CBWM) to collaborate with the Central Statistical Agency and the editorial board of Woman Today, the most circulated women's magazine in Bulgaria. In 1969, The CBWM received over 16,000 responses from working women. Their findings indicated that the majority of Bulgarian women wished to have more children, but felt overworked and unable to balance work and maternal duties. The survey also revealed that 12% of Bulgarian children under the age of seven were left without supervision during the work day. The CBWM recommended that the state provide women with paid maternity leave and expand the availability of kindergartens and crèches.

The CBMW also played a large role in the enforcement of legislation that benefited women in the workplace, such as limiting working hours for mothers and addressing the lack of quality women's clothing. By 1975, Bulgarian women were promised a 120-day maternity leave, with an additional six months of paid leave at the national minimum wage. Women were guaranteed unpaid leave for three years, after which they were allocated a place in a kindergarten. Employers were legally obliged to hold a woman's position during a mother's absence. Lagadinova also pressured the government to commit to building thousands of new kindergartens.

== Contribution to internationalism and women's rights ==
Lagadinova contributed to women's rights by improving the lives of families in the Eastern and Western Bloc. During her presidency of the Committee of the Bulgarian Women's Movement (CBWM) she worked with the Women's International Democratic Federation (WIDF) which aimed to bring women in the Eastern and Western blocs of the Cold War together to defuse aggression in international relations. Lagadinova also provided material and logistical support for new women's committees and movements across Asia and Africa.

At the third World Conference on Women in 1985 in Nairobi she was elected as a general rapporteur. From that year onwards till 1988, she also became the member of the UN Institute for Training Women.

Lagadinova worked with various international groups during the United Nations International Year of Women in 1975, then helped set up coalitions of women's organisations in the 1970s and 1980s to pressure governments to fund maternity leaves. Thanks in part to her work, all countries except Papua New Guinea, Suriname, Liberia and the United States now legally guarantee some form of paid maternity leave.

== Awards ==
In 1959, Lagadinova was awarded the Order of Cyril, by the Government of Bulgaria for her work in plant genetics. In 1991, Lagadinova received the prestigious “Presidential Medal of Outstanding Achievement” by the Claremont Graduate School in California.

== Death ==
In 1989, Lagadinova retired from public life. Twenty-seven years after retirement, Lagadinova gave an interview to American ethnographer Kristen Ghodsee, in which she advised, “You must fight for something you believe in.” On October 29, 2017, Lagadinova died in her sleep at Sofia, Bulgaria.
