= Docip =

Foundation preserving the culture of indigenous peoples

- Indigenous Peoples' Centre for Documentation, Research and Information
- Centre de Documentation, de Recherche et d'Information des Peuples Autochtones

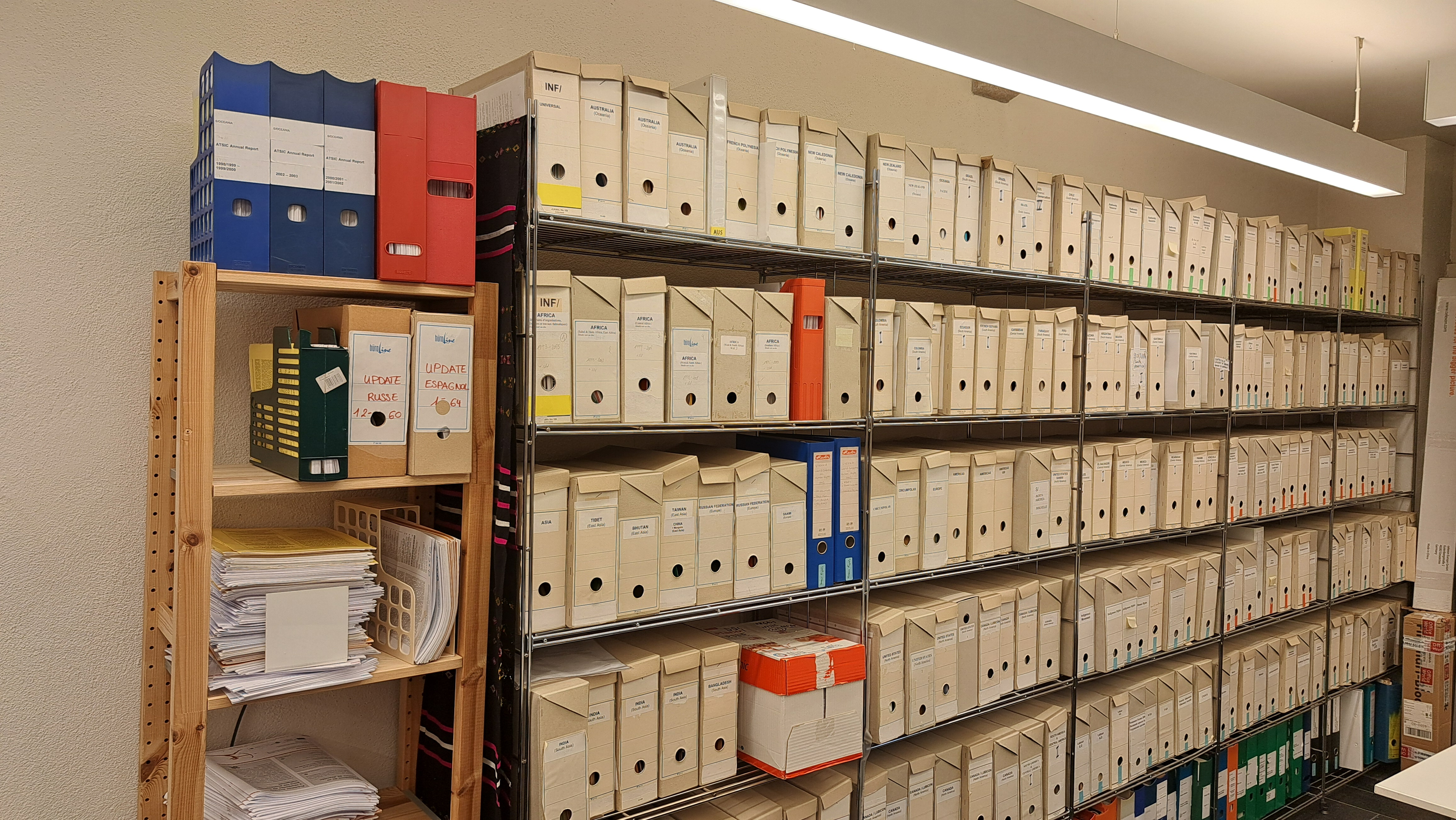
- Boxes on a bookshelf at the Docip documentation centre containing Indigenous Peoples' statements delivered at the United Nations 1977–2026
- Abbreviation: Docip
- Formation: 1978
- Type: NGO
- Headquarters: Geneva
- Coordinates: 46°13′23″N 6°7′53″E
- Official languages: French, English, Spanish, Russian
- Director: Rémi Orsier
- Website: www.docip.org/en/

The Indigenous Peoples' Center for Documentation, Research and Information (French: Centre de Documentation, de recherche et d'Information des Peuples autochtones, Docip) is a Swiss non-profit, non-governmental organisation supporting Indigenous peoples in defending their rights, primarily by working with the United Nations and European institutions. Registered in Switzerland, it is headquartered in Geneva with an office in Brussels.

== Background ==
Indigenous peoples have difficulties in making presentations to the United Nations or other international bodies whose members are states. In order for them to participate in the first international meetings about Indigenous rights, a recognised non-governmental organisation had to submit a proposal on their behalf, or yield their own slot in a discussion.

A main barrier is language; statements at the UN are translated into its six official languages: English, French, Chinese, Arabic, Spanish and Russian. Indigenous contributors need to learn not only an official language but the formal processes of international meetings. These include forms of language which are familiar to diplomats but very different from Indigenous oral traditions.

Indigenous representatives who become very involved in international diplomacy risk becoming out of touch with the everyday concerns of the groups they represent.

== Services ==
Docip monitors international meetings with Indigenous representation and records their contributions. It also provides translation, interpretation, meeting rooms, and other services. As well as collecting documents related to Indigenous rights, it provides training to Indigenous delegates and informs them about international meetings that might be relevant.

== History ==
Docip was created in 1978 as a result of the International NGO Conference on Discrimination against Indigenous Populations in the Americas, which had taken the previous year in Geneva. The conference's Indigenous delegations expressed a need for translation assistance, secretarial help, and a document archive to help with future participation. Docip's founding members included Guatemalan lawyer Augusto Willemsen-Diaz, Canadian peace activist Edith Ballantyne, and Lakota Oglala activist Bill Means. Working at the forerunner of the Office of the United Nations High Commissioner for Human Rights, Willemsen-Diaz had written an influential report on discrimination against Indigenous populations in the UN system. Pierrette Birraux, who joined in 1980, described Docip's function thus:

[O]n the one side, there were the states and UN officials with all the logistical support they needed, and on the other, indigenous peoples who had none of this. So, the goal was to reduce, even marginally, the enormous gap in resources between the stakeholders.

For the working group meetings in Geneva that led to the 2007 UN Declaration on the Rights of Indigenous Peoples, Docip was one of several NGOs supporting the travel and participation of Indigenous groups. It provided facilities including a computer room. In 2002, it was given consultative status with ECOSOC, the United Nations Department of Economic and Social Affairs. Docip's European office, established in Brussels in 2016, supports relations between the European Union (EU) and Indigenous delegates.

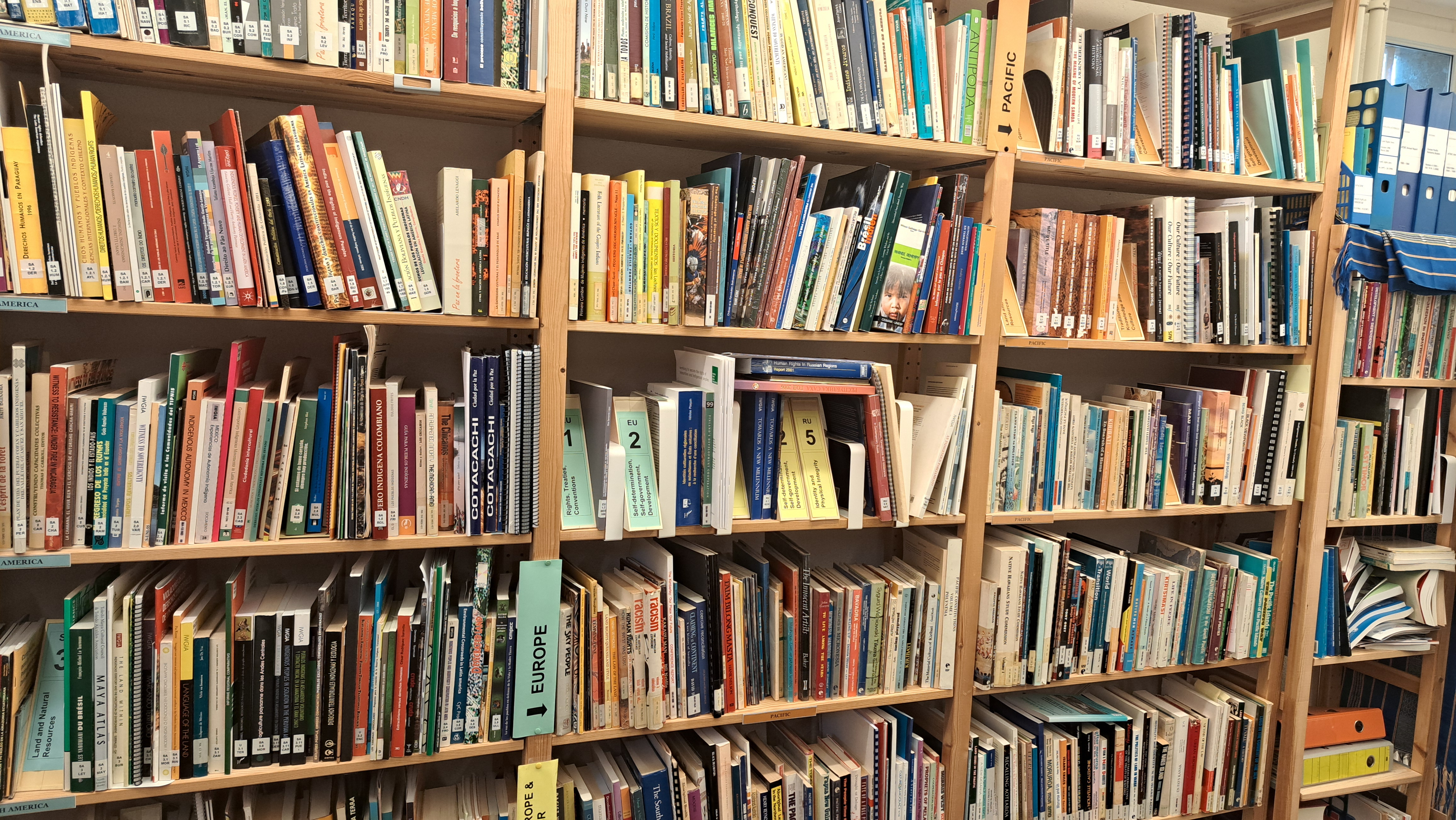
Shelves of books on Indigenous Peoples and their rights at the Docip documentation centre

In August 1987 a fire damaged part of Docip's document archive. By 1991 it had reconstructed the missing documents through a network of volunteers who contacted all the Indigenous groups who had participated in the relevant meetings.

In 2017, Docip's collection entitled "Declarations made by indigenous peoples to the United Nations from 1982 to 2015" was inscribed by UNESCO on its Memory of the World International Register, recognising it as globally important documentary heritage. A subset of the 22,000 items in Docip's archive at that point, the collection consisted of submissions by or on behalf of Indigenous groups to UN bodies, totalling 90,000 pages of physical documents as well as a digital archive. In 2023, Docip reported it had archived more than 15,000 statements by Indigenous peoples.

== See also ==
- International Work Group for Indigenous Affairs
- List of indigenous peoples
- List of Indigenous rights organizations
