= Lucille M. Mair =

Jamaican ambassador

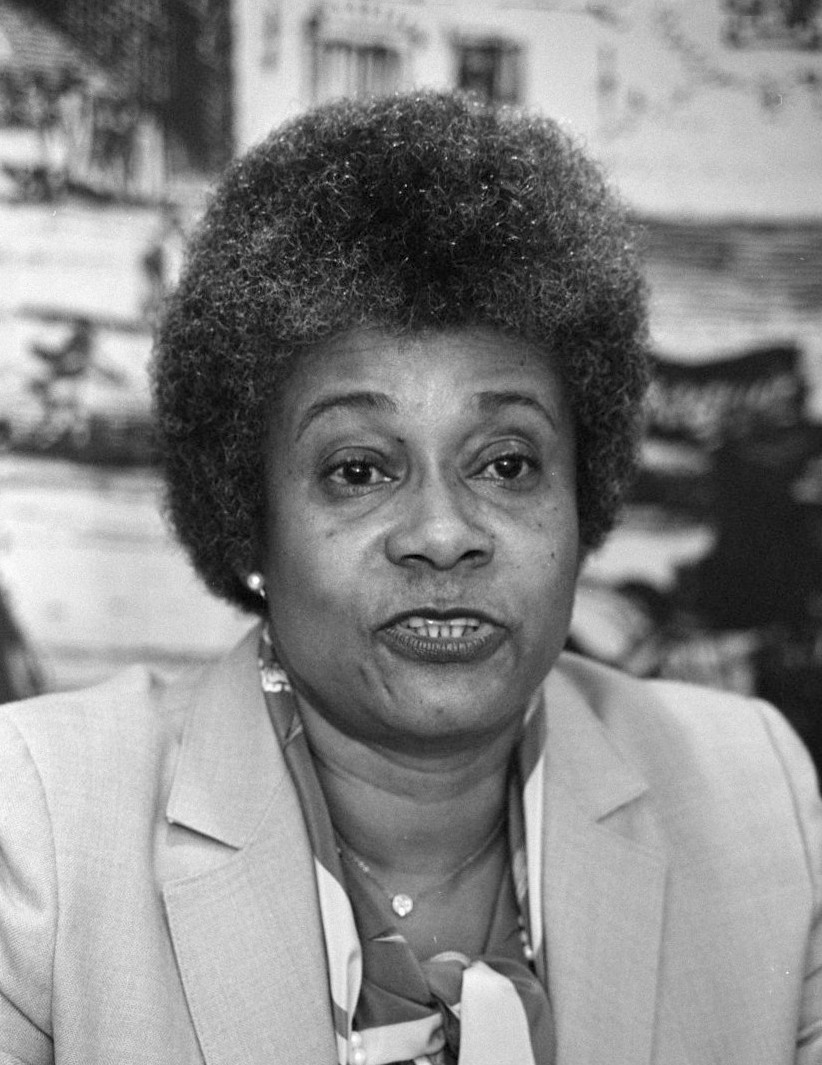
Lucille Mair in 1980

Lucille Mathurin Mair, (née Walrond; 1924 – 28 January 2009), was a Jamaican ambassador, author, diplomat and gender specialist. In March 1982, she became the first female Under Secretary General of the United Nations. She died aged 85 in Kingston, Jamaica.

== Education and career ==
Born in Kingston, Jamaica in 1924, Mair obtained a first degree in history at London University. In 1974 she obtained a PhD in history from the University of the West Indies with a dissertation entitled "A Historical Study of Women in Jamaica 1655–1844", about which Verene Shepherd has said: "Over a period of three decades, it became the most sought-after unpublished work among students and scholars of Caribbean history and culture."

Mair served as Assistant Secretary-General in the office of the United Nations Secretary in 1979, from which she performed the role of Secretary-General for the World Conference of the United Nations Decade for Women held in 1980 in Copenhagen. From 1981 to 1982, she served as special advisor to the United Nations Children's Fund (UNICEF) on Women's Development at the level of assistant secretary general. She then went on to serve as Secretary-General of the United Nations Conference on Palestine from 1982 to 1987. In March 1982, Mair was appointed as Under Secretary General of the United Nations, becoming the first woman ever to hold such a title. She was the Permanent Representative of Jamaica to the United Nations from 1992 to 1995 and was also Ambassador to Cuba.

== Personal life and death ==
Mair was a widow who single-handedly raised three children. She remarried but filed for divorce. Mair died on 28 January 2009 at her home in Kingston, aged 85. United Nations Secretary General Ban Ki-moon expressed his condolences through a statement, praising Mair as a "lifelong champion of the rights of women".

== Recognition ==
The International Institute of Social Studies (ISS) awarded its honorary doctorate to Lucille Mair in 1988. In 1996, she received CARICOM's Triennial Award for Women. On 25 October 2016, Mair was posthumously inducted into the Wolmer's Hall of Fame.
