= Incomindios Switzerland =

Human rights organization that focuses on the native populations of the Americas

Incomindios (International Committee for the Indigenous Peoples of the Americas) is a human rights organization that focuses on the rights of the native populations of North, South, and Central America.

The organization was founded in 1974 on the suggestion of members of the International Indian Treaty Council.

Since 2003, the organization has been given non-governmental organization status (Category II) at the Economic and Social Council of the United Nations.

Today Incomindios Switzerland has over 1,000 members and is headquartered in Zürich, Switzerland with a branch in London, UK.

== Activities ==
Incomindios Switzerland was founded to give Indian groups access to the UN Working Group on Indigenous Populations in Geneva. This task continues through the efforts of a voluntary task force.

Other voluntary working groups are involved in efforts for the release of Leonard Peltier, against uranium mining in Indian lands, and for improved education and communications infrastructure for Indians.

The three key focuses of the organizations are:

- Rights
- Culture and education
- Natural resources
