= Tokyo Ginko Kyokai Building =

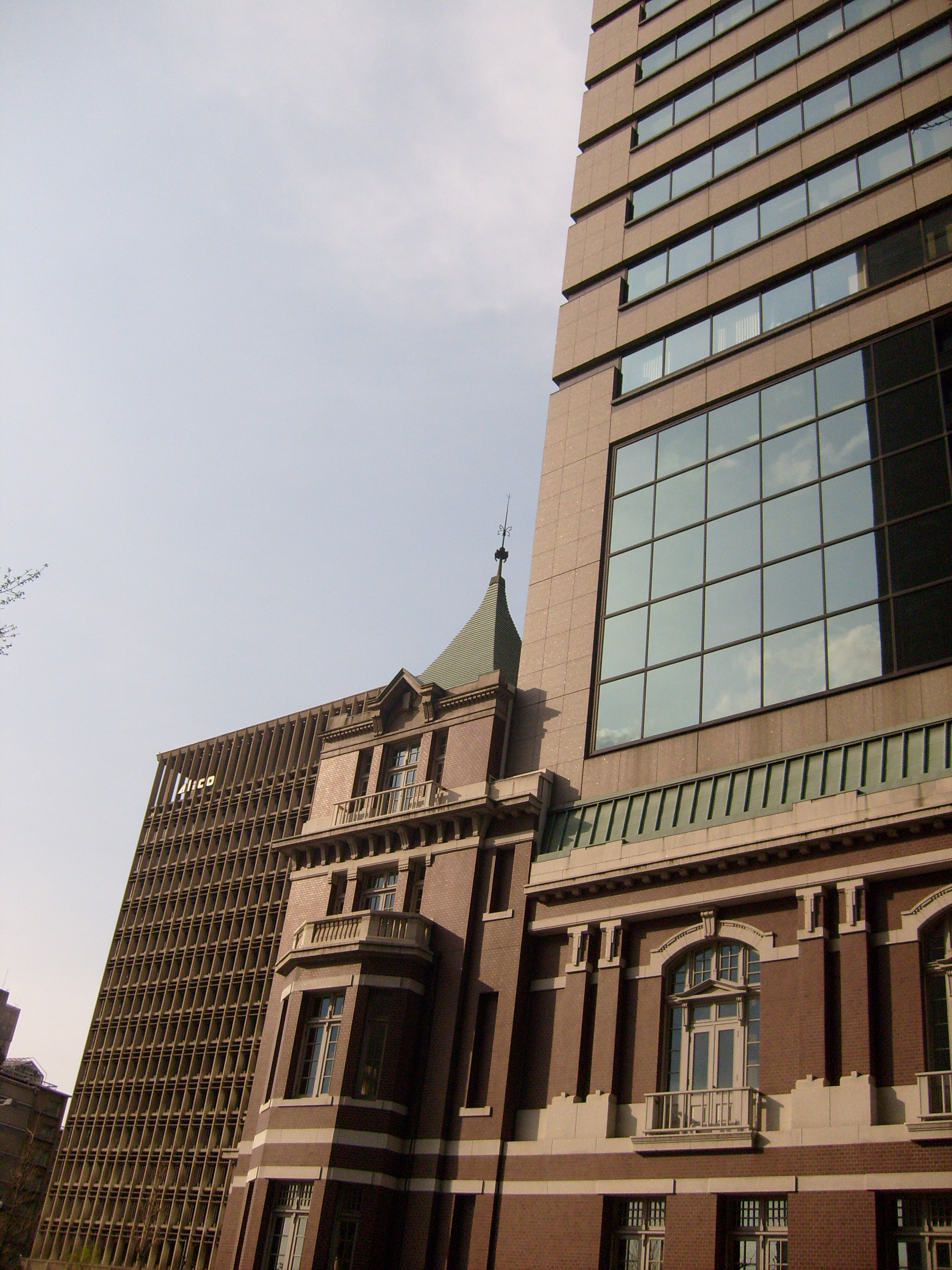
- Tokyo Ginko Kyokai Building in 2008

General information
- Type: Office
- Location: 3-1, Marunouchi 1-chome, Chiyoda-ku; Tokyo, Japan
- Coordinates: 35.683611°N 139.763056°E
- Completed: 1993
- Opening: September 1993
- Demolished: 2016
- Owner: Mitsubishi Estate

Height
- Roof: 88.2 m (289 ft)

Technical details
- Floor count: 20
- Floor area: 914 square metres (9,800 sq ft)
- Lifts/elevators: 8 passenger + 1 freight

Tokyo Bankers Association Building in Marunouchi district of Tokyo was a skyscraper best known for incorporating the facade of the older Tokyo Bank Meeting House, which was originally completed in 1916. The skyscraper was demolished in 2016.

== Gallery ==
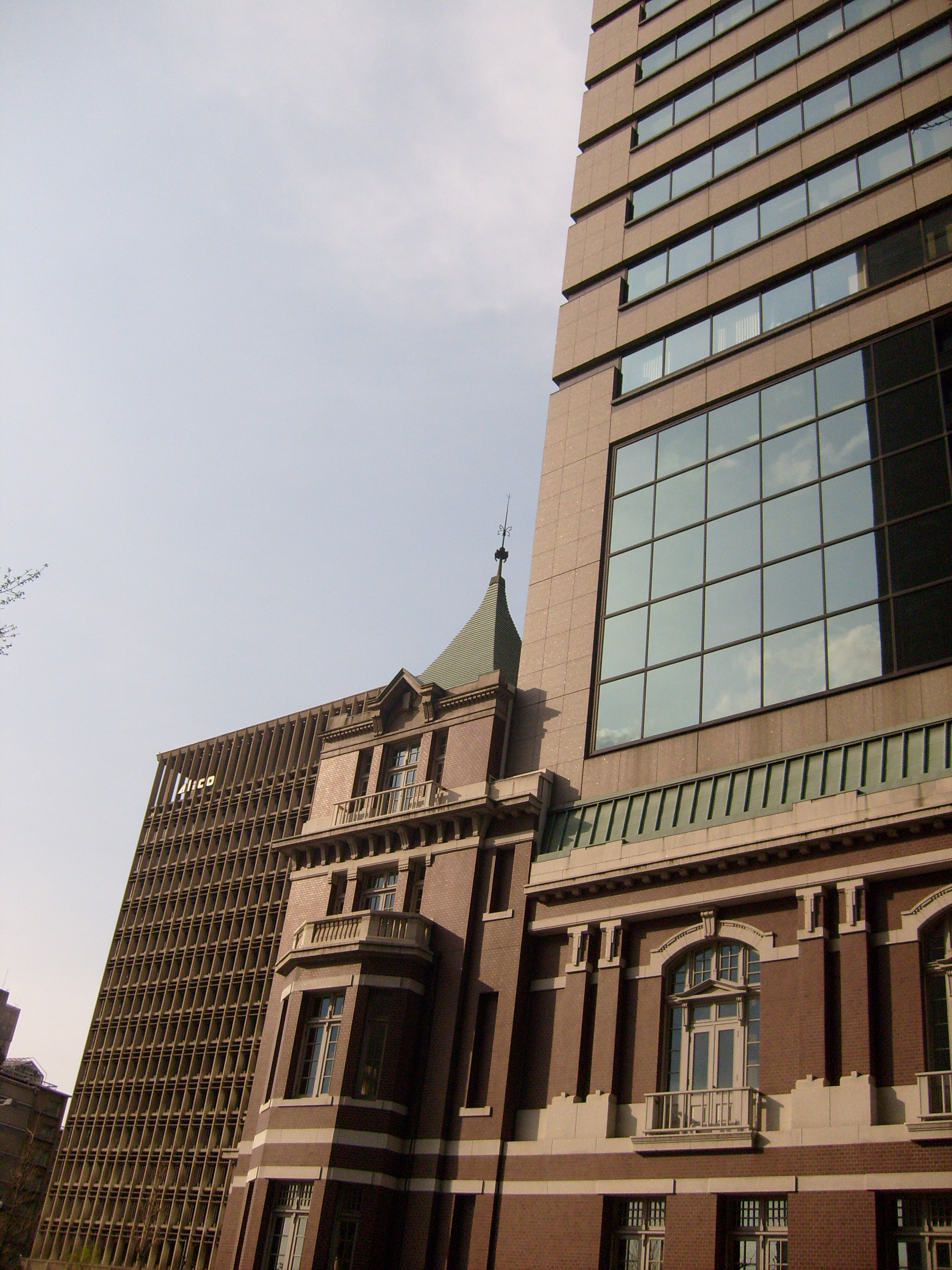
The exterior of the base.

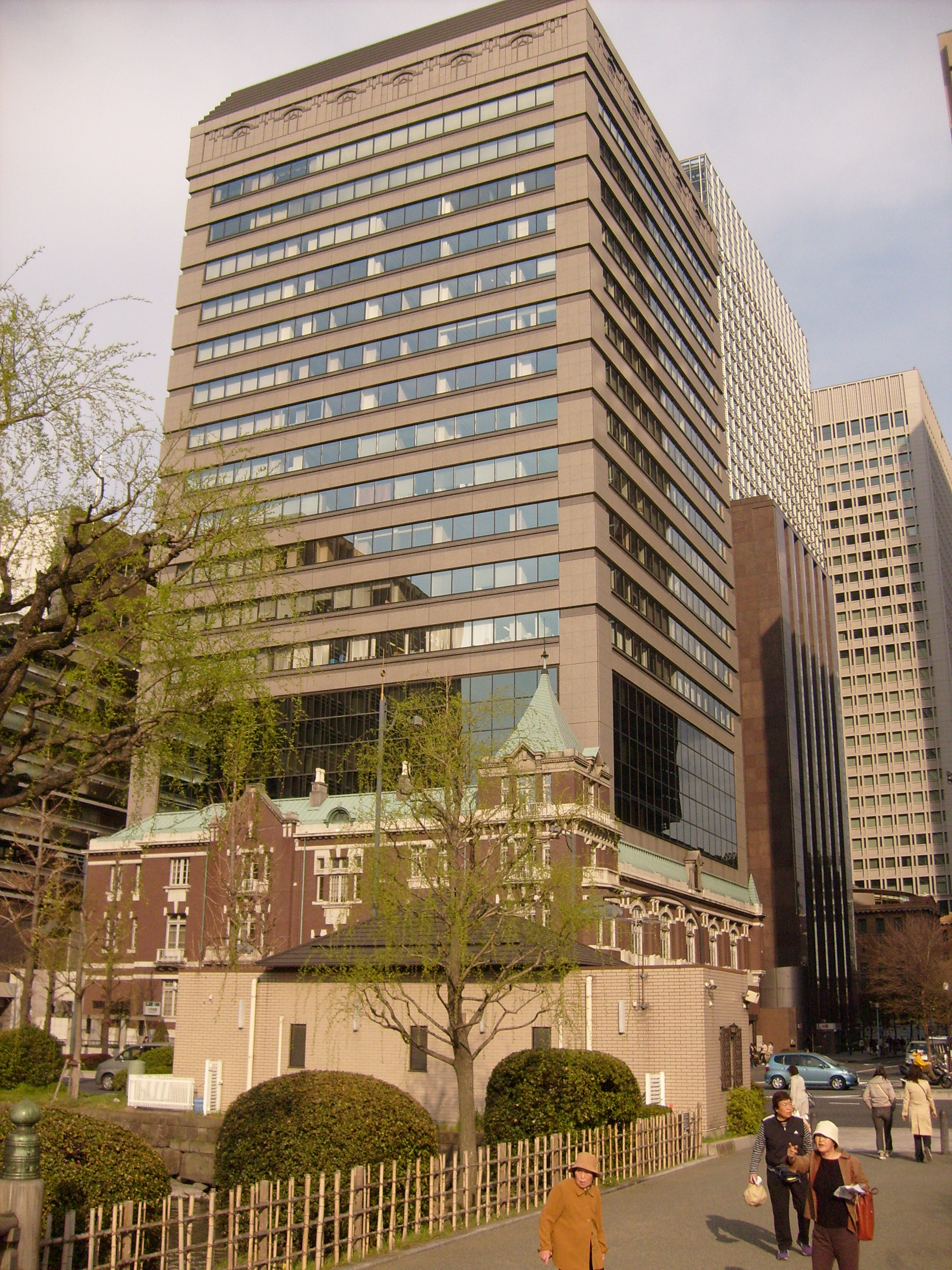
View from across the bridge.

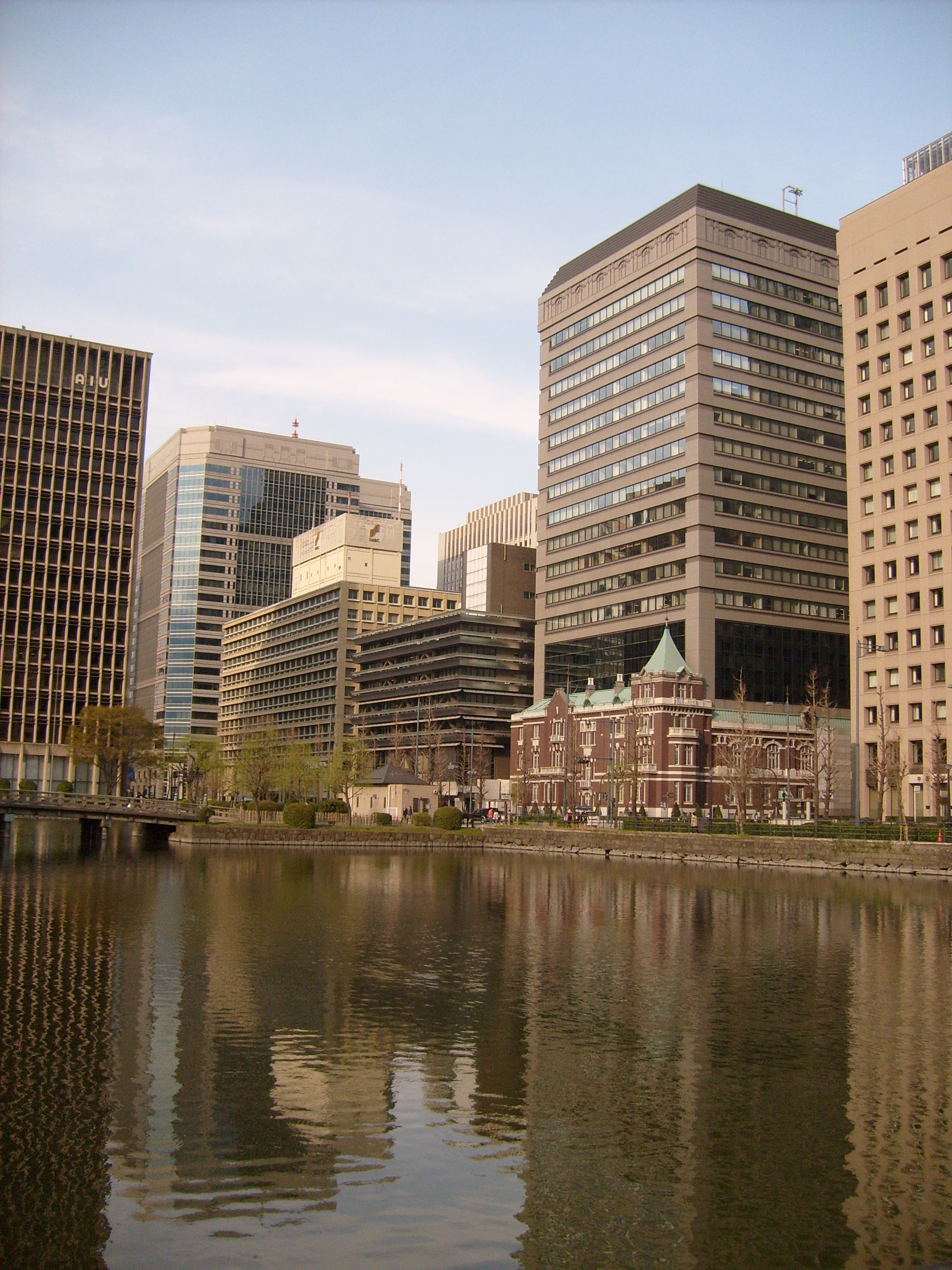
View from across the pond.
