= LULUCF Regulation =

Regulation (EU) 2018/841
- European Union regulation
- Text with EEA relevance
- Title: Regulation (EU) 2018/841 of the European Parliament and of the Council of 30 May 2018 on the inclusion of greenhouse gas emissions and removals from land use, land use change and forestry in the 2030 climate and energy framework, and amending Regulation (EU) No 525/2013 and Decision No 529/2013/EU
- Made by: European Parliament & Council of the European Union
- Made under: Art. 192 TFEU
- Journal reference: OJ L 156, 19.6.2018, pp. 1–25

History
- European Parliament vote: 17 April 2018
- Council Vote: 14 May 2018
- Date made: 30 May 2018
- Entry into force: 9 July 2018

Other legislation
- Amended by: Regulation (EU) 2023/839

The Regulation (EU) 2018/841, commonly known as the LULUCF Regulation, is a European Union (EU) regulation on accounting and governance of greenhouse gas emissions and removals on the land use, land-use change, and forestry (LULUCF) sector in the EU. The regulation sets legally binding net carbon removal targets for each EU member state to reach by 2030 on their respective land use sectors. The original act stems from 2018 and it was substansially amended in 2023 reflecting increased ambition on climate action in the EU.

The initial LULUCF Regulation, proposed by the Juncker Commission, stipulated a so called "no-debit rule" which meant that each member state's respective land use sector emissions could not exceed the removals over a 5-year period. For forest land emissions and removals the regulation established "forest reference levels" based on data from 2000 to 2009. It determed how much forest land emissions or removals member states could count towards the no-debit rule. The regulation included also flexibility mechanisms whereby member states could swap a limited amount of emission reductions from non-LULUCF sectors towards the LULUCF sector no-debit rule under certain conditions.

In July 2021, the Von der Leyen Commission I put forward the Fit for 55 legislative package to amend multiple pieces of EU legislation, including the LULUCF Regulation, in order to achieve the new 55% greenhouse gas reduction target by 2030 compared to 1990 levels as outlined in the Commission's flagship European Green Deal initiative. The revision of the LULUCF Regulation was passed in 2023 and it set the overall EU target of LULUCF net carbon removals to 310 million tonnes CO_{2}eq annually by 2030. Each member state received a net carbon removal target calculated on the basis of their respective 2016 to 2018 LULUCF sector outcomes (in total 256 million tonnes CO_{2}eq). This means that the Regulation requires the EU member states to provide an additional 42 million tonnes CO_{2}eq of carbon removal compared to the 2016–2018 average.

== See also ==
- European Union Emissions Trading System
- Effort Sharing Regulation
