= Forest Peoples Programme =

UK-based non-governmental organisation

Forest Peoples Programme (FPP)
- Founded: 1990, UK
- Type: Charity, International non-governmental organisation
- Purpose: Self-determination; Indigenous peoples' rights Tropical forests Community-based forest management
- Location: Moreton-in-Marsh, UK
- Region served: Global
- Method: Advocacy, Research, Capacity Building, Training
- Key people: Marcus Colchester
- Website: www.forestpeoples.org

Forest Peoples Programme (FPP) is a non-governmental organisation based in Moreton-in-Marsh, England. It advocates an alternative vision of how forests should be managed and controlled, based on respect for the rights of the people who know them best. FPP works with forest peoples in South America, Africa, and Asia, to help them secure their rights, build up their own organisations and negotiate with governments and companies as to how economic development and conservation are the best achieved on their lands.

Forests cover 31% of total land area of the planet. Of that, 12% are designated for the conservation of biological diversity and nearly all are inhabited. Many of the peoples, who live in and have customary rights to their forests, have developed ways of life and traditional knowledge that are attuned to their forest environments. Yet, forest policies commonly treat forests as empty lands controlled by the state and available for 'development' – colonisation, logging, plantations, dams, mines, oil wells, gas pipelines and agribusiness. These encroachments often force forest peoples out of their forest homes. Many conservation schemes to establish wilderness reserves also deny forest peoples' rights.

== History ==
Forest Peoples Programme (FPP) was founded in 1990 in response to the forest crisis, specifically to support indigenous forest peoples' struggles to defend their lands and livelihoods. It was registered as a non-governmental human rights Dutch Stichting in 1997, and then later, in 2000, as a UK charity, No. 1082158 and a company limited by guarantee (England & Wales) Reg. No. 3868836, with a registered office in the UK.

FPP's focus, in the beginning, came from the expertise and relationships that the small founding team had with specific communities, primarily in the Guyanas and in South and South East Asia. Forest Peoples Programme has grown into an organisation that now operates right around the tropical forest belt where it serves to bridge the gap between policy makers and forest peoples. FPP holds consultative status with the United Nations Economic and Social Council (ECOSOC). Through advocacy, practical projects and capacity building, FPP supports forest peoples to deal directly with organizations and institutions, regionally, nationally, and internationally that shape their lives and futures. Forest Peoples Programme has contributed to, and continues supporting, the growing indigenous peoples' movement whose voice is gaining influence and attention on the world-wide stage.

== Activities ==
- Monitoring and documenting violations of the rights of indigenous peoples
- Publishing informational materials from the series "Transforming Conservation: from conflict to justice"

== Publications ==
Forest Peoples Programme produces a range of publications, including reports, briefings, training manuals, papers, submissions to human rights bodies, statements, letters, urgent action requests, as well as news articles.

== See also ==
- FERN
- World Rainforest Movement
- Indigenous rights
- UNFCCC
- Declaration on the Rights of Indigenous Peoples
