= Tanzania Media Women's Association =

- Abbreviation: TAMWA
- Formation: November 17, 1987
- Type: Non-governmental organization (NGO)
- Purpose: Women's rights, children's rights, gender issues, media advocacy
- Headquarters: Dar es Salaam, Tanzania
- Website: https://tamwa.org/a/

The Tanzania Media Women's Association (TAMWA) (Tanzanian: Chama cha Wanahabari Wanawake Tanzania (CHAWAHATA)) is a nonprofit non-governmental organisation focused on women's rights and children's rights. Based in Dar es Salaam, Tanzania, it also has an office in Zanzibar.

== History ==
TAMWA was founded in 1987, part of a new generation of women's rights organizations in Africa established around the time of the 1985 World Conference on Women in Nairobi, distinguished by their autonomy from national governments. In Tanzania, these groups included Women Research and Documentation Project, at the University of Dar es Salaam, the Women Advancement Trust (WAT), and the Tanzania Gender Networking Programme.

TAMWA was founded by a group of female journalists who had previously worked, beginning in 1979, to bring women's issues into the forefront through radio broadcasts on a variety of topics, including pregnancy among school girls, violence against women, and other local issues. After dispersing, they came back together in 1986 to form a formal association. The inspiration for the group came from the journalist Fatma Alloo, who witnessed the formation of Uganda Media Women Organization (UMWA) while working as a journalist in Uganda. Initially, the organization's goals were to encourage more opportunities for female journalists, and to address gender discrimination in newsrooms across Tanzania. However, during the process of writing a constitution, the organization's goals broadened to focus on educating women on their rights and advocating for the rights of women nationwide. The organization was registered on November 17, 1987. The organization's first chairperson was Fatma Alloo, while Halima Shariff served as the first Secretary General.

Some of the organization's early efforts included printing a monthly newsletter entitled Sauti ya Siti, named after Siti Binti Saad (Saad also means "woman" in Kiswahili). The goal of Sauti ya Siti was to provide a voice for Tanzanian women to be heard by public stakeholders and to bring women's concerns to the forefront. Starting in March 1988, it went on to publish 39 issues by 2016, and it received funds from the Canadian Organization for Development to cover printing costs. They also produced a booklet in Kiswahili to explain how to register NGOs so as to allow more people to create organizations beneficial to the Tanzanian public. In 1997, TAMWA worked with FemAct to hold a symposium on gender violence for members of the Tanzanian Parliament in Dodoma.

In recent years, TAMWA has used what they call "Bang style journalism" to air these concerns publicly. This includes educational materials in newspapers, on billboards, calendars, and posters, as well as through radio and television segments. From 2003 to 2007, 50,000 posters were produced per year carrying a variety of messages, including about women and leadership, female genital mutilation, and sexual violence.

TAMWA's members are required to have a Diploma in journalism. As of 2012, the organization had over 100 journalists working in electronic and print media. The organization holds an annual General Meeting of all its members each March to make decisions about the organization's future.

From 2009 to 2014, the organization focused on five major strategic issues:

- Gender Based Violence
- Good Governance
- Gender equality
- Poverty, and
- Health.

TAMWA also worked extensively to include important aspects of women's issues into the writing of the 2014 Tanzanian Constitution.

== Issues and activities ==
TAMWA has been active in encouraging women to run for the National Assembly of Tanzania and pressing political parties to nominate more women candidates. These efforts were cited in Africa Today as contributing to significant increases in the number of women candidates for the Assembly in 1995 and 2005.

Efforts were directed towards producing published material to explain the problems with domestic violence, gender-based violence, female genital mutilation and other harmful practices. TAMWA also founded a Crisis Center in Dar es Salaam in 1990 to provide aid and assistance to those who suffered from domestic violence. In 2003, the center received 787 clients, and it was funded by the Southern African AIDS Training Program (SAT). This center eventually evolved into an independent organization (the Crisis Resolving Center) in 2007. In response to increasing problems with sanitation in primary schools, TAMWA took efforts to expand their coverage and advocacy for health to include hygiene as well. In 2000, TAMWA launched a Breast & Cervical Cancer awareness campaign.
