= Edith Ballantyne =

Czech-Canadian activist (1922–2025)

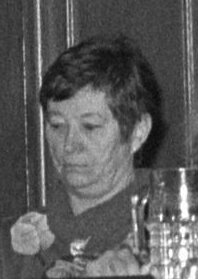
- Ballantyne in 1981
- Born: Edith Müller; 10 December 1922; Krnov, Czechoslovakia
- Died: 25 March 2025 (aged 102); Geneva, Switzerland
- Citizenship: Canadian
- Occupation: Peace activist
- Years active: 1968–1998
- Spouse: Campbell Ballantyne

Edith Ballantyne (née Müller; 10 December 1922 – 25 March 2025) was a Czech-born Canadian activist who was a prominent member of the Women's International League for Peace and Freedom (WILPF) since 1969. At that time, she became the executive secretary of the international organisation, based in Geneva, Switzerland, serving in that capacity for twenty-three years. Between 1992 and 1998, she served as the International President of the organisation. In 1995, she was honoured as the recipient of the Gandhi Peace Award.

== Early life ==
Edith Müller was born on 10 December 1922 in Krnov in Czech Silesia to Rosa and Alois Müller. She was raised in Czechoslovakia until the Sudeten Crisis of 1938. The family fled first to England, and by 1939 made their way to Canada, where they were placed by the Canadian Pacific Railway Company to farm in British Columbia. Unable to sustain their family, they moved to Toronto in 1941, where Müller found work as a domestic labourer. Unable to speak English, she was taught the language by Women's International League for Peace and Freedom (WILPF) volunteers, who kept track of the Bohemian refugees and tried to assist them in making adjustments to life in Canada. Joining the WILPF, Müller found their message of pacifism and human rights inspiring but lost touch with the group when she moved to Montreal in 1945. In July 1948, Müller married Campbell Ballantyne, an official of the International Labour Office and moved with him to Geneva later that same year.

== Career ==
Upon her arrival in Switzerland, Ballantyne began work for the World Health Organization, in the publications section, as the deputy director. After five years, she left the post to care for the couple's four children. After twenty years of living in Geneva, she discovered that the headquarters of WILPF were located there and volunteered to serve in 1968. The following year, she became the Secretary General of the organisation, and accepted a full-time position to work on improving WILPF's interaction with NGOs and the United Nations (UN). In 1970, she attended the WILPF's Eighteenth Congress, held in New Delhi, which had a profound effect on her view of balancing freedom and peace. She recognized that if peaceful means of solving a conflict had been exhausted, there had to be a means to recognize that the oppressed were likely to resort to violence and members could support non-violence without condemning exploited persons who felt that other options did not exist. The debates that followed the meeting, resulted in a resolution that idealistic pursuit of pacifism could not replace the recognition that the ultimate goal of peace was to allow people to attain their liberation and live freely. In 1972, she became the coordinator of WILPF's work with the UN. Her Indian trip was followed in 1975 with an observer group which toured the Middle East, which spurred Ballantyne to recommend that WILPF press for continued dialogue between the sides of conflict but remain neutral on issues such as violence and human rights abuses which resulted from, rather than caused conflict. She believed that the role of WILPF was to encourage both sides to find peaceful means to coexist without focusing on who was to blame for the situation or favouritism.

In 1976, Ballantyne was elected to direct the Conference of Non-governmental Organisations (CONGO) of the UN and served as its president for the next six years. As the first representative to hold the post from a peace activist group, she opened the door to the pursuit of disarmament goals. In 1978 she was one of the founders of the Indigenous Peoples' Centre for Documentation, Research and Information (Docip), created to support and document the representation of Indigenous peoples at the UN and in other international forums. When the World Conference on Women, 1980 was held in Copenhagen, Ballantyne served as chair of program development for NGO Forum, ensuring that there was strong emphasis on peace and disarmament in the discussions of the various workshops. She hosted two organising committees, one in Geneva and the other in New York City, to ensure that broad input from diverse groups formed the foundation of the conference. The following year, she helped develop a conference "Women of Europe in Action for Peace" with the goal of bringing together activists and feminists to study the fears propelling the arms race and develop programs for monitoring developments in peace talks. In 1983, Ballantyne was among 10,000 women who met with generals at NATO headquarters to protest new missile deployments in Europe. The missiles were deployed despite protests and soon thereafter, the United States invaded Grenada. Coupled with US military involvement in the Contra War, Ballantyne chaired the "International Conference on Nicaragua and Peace in Central America" with Adolfo Pérez Esquivel in Lisbon in 1984 to discuss the escalating arms race. Her focus on following both mainstream strategies to achieve peace and supporting organisations which refused to adopt traditional strategies became the basis of WILPF policy to adopt a two-pronged approach in support of peace activism.

Ballantyne again served as chair for the planning committee of the NGO forum for the World Conference on Women, 1985 to be held in Nairobi. The Peace Tent, an idea pressed by Ballantyne, was set up on the lawn of the University of Nairobi and became a focal point of the conference. At the tent, daily sessions were held where women discussed the impacts of war on women and children. In 1992, Ballantyne became the International President of the WILPF and served in that capacity for the next six years. In 1995, she was honoured as the recipient of the Gandhi Peace Award.

Ballantyne died from an infection at a hospital in Geneva, Switzerland, on 25 March 2025, at the age of 102.

== See also ==
- List of peace activists
