= Elizabeth Mary Palmer =

Music and singing teacher, performer, composer, entertainment promoter

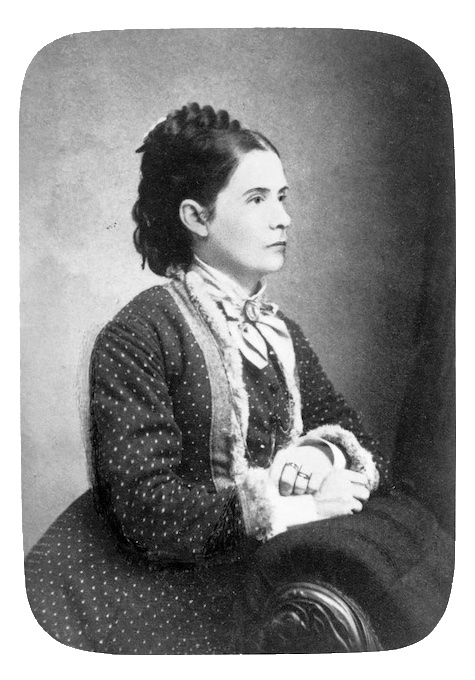
Elizabeth Mary Palmer

Elizabeth Mary Palmer (1832–1897) was a New Zealand music and singing teacher, performer, composer, and entertainment promoter. She was born in Bramford, Suffolk, England. She is known for her composition Twas only a dream (1884).
