= Ginko Sato =

Japanese government official

Ginko Sato (佐藤 ギン子) is a Japanese government official.

== Biography ==
Sato was educated at the University of Tokyo and completed postgraduate studies in the United Kingdom and the United States. She began her career working at the Ministry of Labor in 1938, where she worked on the policy promoting equal working rights for women and on the development of Japan's law on equal employment opportunities.

Sato is an external director on the board of Hitachi. In 2004, she and Sakie T. Fukushima were the only women board members at the 27 Japanese companies that are members of Fortune's Global 200 list.

Sato has also held the position of chair of the Japan Association for the Advancement of Working Women.
