= Persona 2 =

Persona 2 logo

Persona 2 (Note: Japanese: ペルソナ2, Hepburn: Perusona Tsū), also known as Shin Megami Tensei: Persona 2, is a duology of role-playing video games developed and published by Atlus for the PlayStation. It consists of the second and third installments in the Persona franchise, which is a spin-off of the Megami Tensei franchise:

- Persona 2: Innocent Sin (1999)
- Persona 2: Eternal Punishment (2000)

== See also ==
- Persona 3 The Movie: No. 2, Midsummer Knight's Dream, a 2014 Japanese animated film and the second installment in a film series based on the Persona 3 video game by Atlus
- Persona Q2: New Cinema Labyrinth, a 2018 role-playing video game developed by P-Studio and Lancarse and published by Sega for the Nintendo 3DS
