= Taiga Rescue Network =

Taiga Rescue Network (TRN) was an international network of more than 200 non-governmental organizations, indigenous peoples and individuals working to defend the world's boreal forests, also known as Taiga. TRN was established in 1992 to give a voice to support, link and publicize local struggles fighting for the boreal forests and its peoples. TRN no longer exists. In 2010, TRN held its last conference in Sweden. The website remained online until April 2013.

== Mission and Goals ==
TRN's mission was support local struggle and strengthen the cooperation between individuals, NGOs and indigenous peoples and nations concerned with the protection, restoration and sustainable use of the world's boreal forests by means that ensure the integrity of natural processes and dynamics.

The goals of the network were 1) Promoting socially beneficial, economically viable and ecologically sound management of the boreal forests; 2) Ensuring Indigenous Peoples rights are respected and local control of resources is guaranteed; 3) Protecting old-growth Northern forests; and 4) Halting destructive extraction and wasteful consumption of products from boreal forests.

== Methods ==
=== Education and advocacy ===
The network worked to disseminate information among governments, industry, and the general public about boreal forest issues by publishing Taiga News, a quarterly publication covering social and environmental issues relating to the entire boreal region; producing fact sheets on sensitive areas under particular threat; compiling profiles of key industry players; publishing reports and studies that critically analyze the trends and challenges facing the boreal region; participating in an ongoing dialogue with public administrations and the private sector on local, national and international levels to strengthen environmental regulations related to forest protection and sustainable forest management in the boreal region; organizing a biennial international conference bringing together various stakeholders (scientists, environmental organizations, indigenous peoples support groups, industry, media).

=== Campaign coordination ===
TRN promoted cooperation through joint projects among NGOs and indigenous peoples by uniting and informing the NGO and indigenous communities through meetings, conferences and seminars; publishing a monthly internal newsletter The Boreal Bulletin with concise and up to date strategic information; managing several topical email lists to improve project coordination and information exchange; supporting environmentalists and indigenous peoples in the boreal region with small grants.

=== Research and policy analysis ===
The network coordinated NGO input into various national and international processes and facilitate joint position papers outlining the NGO vision for sustainable forestry in the boreal region; monitored the various national and international certification and ecolabelling processes and supported independent, performance based certification, such as the approach promoted by the Forest Stewardship Council (FSC); identified forests with high conservation value and work towards their conservation through the establishment of protected areas; and lead the way in mapping trade links of boreal products.
