= World Rainforest Movement =

Environmentalist group based in Uruguay

The World Rainforest Movement (WRM) is an international initiative created to strengthen the global movement in defense of forests, in order to fight deforestation and forest degradation. It was founded in 1986 by activists from around the world.

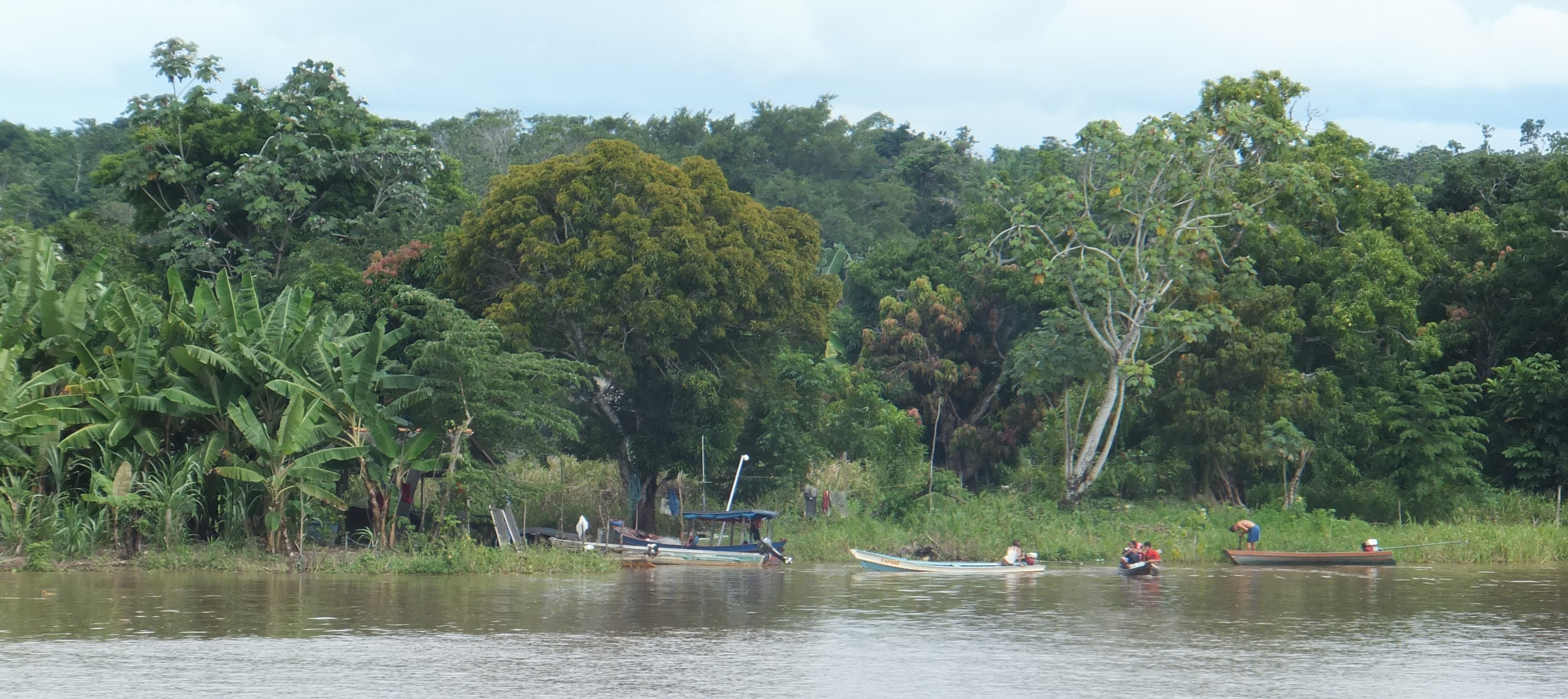
Along the Amazon river, Brazil

WRM believes that this goal can only be achieved by fighting for social and ecological justice, by respecting the collective rights of traditional communities and the right to self-determination of peoples who depend on the forests for their livelihoods.

For this reason, WRM's actions are oriented to support the struggles of indigenous peoples and peasant communities in defense of their territories.

WRM's International Secretariat is composed of a small team with members from different countries. The head office is in Uruguay.

== Main areas of work ==
- Expansion of monoculture tree plantations for the production of timber, cellulose, palm oil, rubber or biomass. Industrial tree plantations pose a major threat to communities beyond tropical forest areas.
- Impacts of corporations that extract timber, minerals, water and fossil fuels from forest territories, and of the infrastructure that supports this exploitation.
- Initiatives that are presented as "solutions" but in fact only exacerbate forest loss and climate change. These include certification of forest management concessions, monoculture tree plantations, carbon offsets, environmental compensation programmes, among others.
- New trends related to corporate tactics and national and international policies that facilitate the appropriation of community forests.
- Local struggles and resistance strategies of movements, organisations and communities in the defence of their territories and forests.
- The differentiated impacts that women face when their lands are encroached and appropriated: sexual violence, harassment, persecution and deprivation of livelihood, among others.

== Activities ==
=== Mutual learning and support for community struggles ===
- Visiting communities that are struggling against the destruction of their forests for tree plantations and other corporate projects, to exchange experiences and to jointly decide on forms of support.
- Supporting meetings elaborated collectively with people from communities, organisations and social movements on the causes of forest destruction, global trends, threats and local resistance.
- Promoting exchanges between activists and organisations that resist against similar threats to their livelihoods.
- Creating spaces of trust and political connection to strengthen communities' struggles.
- Showing solidarity with local and community struggles, based on demands presented by the organisations, communities and activists involved.

=== Production and dissemination of information and analyses ===
- Participating in debates and international campaigns to give visibility to community struggles and to expose the private and state tactics of land grabbing.
- Producing analyses and exposing violations – in local and international spaces – on the impacts of false solutions to the destruction of forests and climate change for communities.
- Producing analyses about new trends and international policies related to climate and biodiversity with forest dwellers threatened by these initiatives.
- Facilitating the flow of information among groups in different regions of the world, for example with translations of texts, petitions and action alerts into local languages.
- Publishing the WRM bulletin, an e-newsletter, since 1997. It exposes struggles, threats and resistance in forests, as well as false policy solutions at international and local level. Articles are written by activists and organizations from all over the world. The bulletin is distributed to more than 10,000 individuals and organizations in 131 countries around the world.
- Producing diverse materials for activists and communities on specific topics.
- Maintaining an online library with WRM materials since 1996, available in Spanish, French, English and Portuguese. Some are also translated into other languages, such as Bahasa Indonesian, Lingala, Malagasy, Swahili and Thai.
