= Declaration of Mexico on the Equality of Women and Their Contribution to Development and Peace =

UN World Conference of the International Women's Year
- Date: 2 July 1975
- Meeting no.: World Conference of the International Women's Year, Mexico City, Mexico. 19 June-2 July 1975
- Code: E/CONF.66/34 (Document)
- Subject: Declaration from the International Women's Year World Conference on Women.
- Result: Approved

Declaration of Mexico on the Equality of Women and their Contribution to Development and Peace 66/34 was a United Nations resolution that was adopted on 2 July 1975, at the close of the International Women's Year World Conference on Women held in Mexico City. The resolution was adopted to promulgate a set of principles concerning the equality of men and women. The Declaration called for action to immediately address the burdens and discrimination women experienced in the labor market, as primary childcare providers, and as political participants around the world.

== Background ==
The Declaration of Mexico on the Equality of Women and Their Contribution to Development and Peace emerged after decades of advocacy from organizations pursuing equal rights for women stemming from the landmark 1948 Universal Declaration of Human Rights (UDHR). The UN Commission on the Status of Women, an advisory body for the UDHR, outlined three guiding principles that would later be incorporated into the Declaration of Mexico and the International Women’s Year Conference: equality, economic development, and peace. Stagnation on the topic of women’s rights in the 1950s and 1960s led to the UN Commission on the Status of Women, joined by the NGO Women’s International Democratic Federation, to pressure the UN General Assembly in 1972 to convene the International Women’s Year Conference, which resulted in the drafting of the Declaration of Mexico. The Declaration was informed and modeled after the Declaration on the Elimination of Discrimination Against Women, adopted by the UN General Assembly on November 7, 1967, and the New International Economic Order, adopted May 1, 1974. Both documents are cited in the Declaration's preamble. The Declaration was the result of two weeks of debate at two simultaneous conferences held during the Mexico City conference that highlighted the divisions in feminist goals between the West, the Eastern Bloc, and the Global South.

=== History of International Women's Year World Conference on Women ===
A 1972 meeting of the UN’s Commission on the Status of Women resulted in a resolution that declared 1975 as International Women’s Year. The resolution originated with the Women’s International Democratic Federation, an NGO particularly strong in Eastern Bloc nations, which noted the UN’s recent success with other designated years devoted to thematic human rights issues. International Women’s Year, and the 1975 Conference in Mexico City (the first of four planned UN women’s conferences) created opportunities for activists, feminists, and women’s NGOs from around the globe to meet, organize, network, and strategize paths forward for women’s rights. The discussion, drafting, and adoption of the Declaration of Mexico was one of the final actions of the conference.

== Drafting ==
The Declaration of Mexico on the Equality of Women and Their Contribution to Development and Peace was one of two resolutions drafted at the 1975 UN International Women’s Year Conference, the other document being the World Plan of Action. While the World Plan of Action was focused on long term issues that limited women’s equality, the Declaration of Mexico was orientated toward immediate action against systemic issues that contributed to women’s oppression around the world. The drafting of the Declaration was the first time that state actors represented by diplomatic representatives to the UN, and civil society represented by a collection of NGOs, came together in an effort to forward human rights issues. The Declaration was crafted out of debates between the Western world, and the Eastern Bloc of Socialist states and non-aligned G-77 states of the Global South. The West was focused on equality between men and women while the Eastern Bloc and G-77 sought to preserve and advance women’s rights while addressing the consequences of imperialism on development and peace. The G-77 states submitted the Declaration of Mexico without the support of the US and Israeli delegations who, due to their opposition to the Declaration's labeling of Zionism and its impacts on Palestine as a form of racism comparable to the Apartheid regime South Africa, instead put their support behind the more moderate World Plan of Action.

=== Summary of Declaration ===
The Declaration of Mexico on the Equality of Women and Their Contribution to Development and Peace consists of a preamble and thirty principles to guide regional, national, and international action for equality, development, and peace.

The preamble consists of seventeen assertions that recognize a worldwide geopolitical and social inequality of women in society and emphasizes the role women have historically played in national liberation movements and international peace initiatives. The principles provide a guide for States, Non-governmental Organizations, women, and men for working toward relieving women of the “double burden of exploitation” [of child-rearing labor] and of eliminating all forms of discrimination against women, wherever and however they may exist.

==== Summary of Preamble ====
Assertion 1 states that women’s problems are problems of whole societies.

Assertion 2 states that international collaboration should be based on the principles of the UN Charter to build an equitable and just global community.

Assertion 3 states that by subscribing to the Charter, members of the United Nations committed to fundamental human rights, including equal rights of men and women and of nations.

Assertion 4 states that the UN has adopted important documents, including the Universal Declaration of Human Rights based on the Charter of Economic Rights and Duties of States.

Assertion 5 states that discrimination against women is incompatible with the general interest of families, societies, and human dignity. Moreover, its continuation is a barrier to the development of women in service to their nations.

Assertions 6 and 7 state that the 1972 UN proclamation of 1975 as International Women’s Year was undertaken to facilitate equality between men and women, world peace, and development as adopted by the Economic and Social Council and General Assembly in 1974.

Assertion 8 states that women have played a role in the history of humanity’s struggles for national liberation and global peace, including international struggles against imperialism and racism.

Assertion 9 states that world development and international peace require equal more participation of women at all levels.

Assertion 10 states that it is the responsibility of States to ensure that all nations meet the conditions necessary for men and women to exercise equal rights.

Assertions 11 and 12 state that women of the world constitute an incredible potential for global social and economic change due to the shared experience of oppression and that women must be immediately integrated into national and international life to effect improvement.

Assertion 13 states that women face a double burden of exploitation due to under-development and that current inequitable systems of international economics hinder any national development attempts to fix this exploitation.

Assertion 14 states that child-bearing should not result in discrimination against women and that men are also responsible for raising children.

Assertion 15 states that there is an urgent need to find better methods of improving the status of women so that they, like men, may participate in the development of their respective nations.

Assertions 16 and 17 state that women must play a significant role in continuing international peace and world development following the World Plan of Action.

==== Summary of Declaration of Principles ====
Principles 1-5 establish equality between men and women as being defined by the acquisition of full and equal rights and opportunities for women. The principles declare it is the responsibility of both the State and Non-governmental Organizations to see that all obstacles blocking women’s equal status with men are removed and that men and women have equal responsibility to the family and in society.

Principles 6-10 assert that women should have opportunities for education, work, training, and other forms of personal/professional development equal to men, and that once granted, women have a responsibility to make full use of any opportunities available to them. Additionally, these principles reaffirm that restructuring economic relationships worldwide is required to provide women with equal conditions and pay related to work. These principles also state that cultural media should be central to removing any stigma against women and projecting a positive image of their value to society. Finally, these principles say resources should be available so that women across the globe can participate in national and international political communities.

Principles 11-17 address inequality, under-development, and the under-utilization of women in world economic systems and assert it is the responsibility of States to undertake transformations in social and economic policies. They affirm that respect for human dignity, the right to choose freely to marry or have children, and access to better qualities of life are rights to which men and women should be equally entitled.

Principles 18-23 state that the present state of international economic structures does not allow for the full advancement of developing countries and, therefore, it is essential to adopt the New International Economic Order. States should promote economic and social progress in all countries that participate in the international community and uphold principles of national sovereignty and equality of States. Furthermore, nations have a responsibility to promote development opportunities for all women within their borders.

Principles 24-26 declare that women have a vital role to play in peace across the world and in all aspects of life, including family, community, nation, and international cooperation. Both women and men should seek to promote international collaboration by removing racial discrimination, colonialism, foreign occupation, and apartheid.

Principles 27-30 declare that women, in solidarity with each other, should protest violations of human rights condemned by the United Nations, including human rights violations typically associated with women, such as prostitution, rape, child marriage, forced marriage, and physical assault. The Declaration concludes by stating that the maintenance of peace requires that women and men reject any State intervention in the internal affairs of another State and should work towards complete disarmament under international control.

== Adoption ==
After a series of roll call votes regarding language and content, the Declaration was passed at the close of the International Women's Year Conference with only two "no" votes, from the United States and Israel, and 19 abstentions.

== Impact ==
The adoption of the Declaration of Mexico, in parallel with the World Plan of Action and the events of the International Women's Year Conference, made the diversity of viewpoints and the multitude of issues affecting women's rights and equality apparent to world leaders and NGOs. The UN General Assembly committed to further action, dedicating the next ten years as the UN Decade for Women, with conferences following in Copenhagen and Nairobi, along with several non-UN conferences that focused on women's rights and equality. The Declaration directly influenced further resolutions and institutions, including the Convention on the Elimination of All Forms of Discrimination Against Women and the UN Development Fund for Women. The comparison of Zionism with "apartheid and racial discrimination" was a precursor to United Nations General Assembly Resolution 3379.
