= United Nations Security Council Resolution 68 =

UN Security Council Resolution 68
- Date: February 10 1949
- Meeting no.: 408
- Code: S/1252 (Document)
- Subject: Armaments: regulation and reduction
- Voting summary: 9 voted for; None voted against; 2 abstained
- Result: Adopted

Security Council composition
- Permanent members: China; France; Soviet Union; United Kingdom; United States
- Non-permanent members: Argentina; Canada; Cuba; Egypt; Norway; Ukrainian SSR

United Nations Security Council Resolution 68, adopted on February 10, 1949, resolved that the United Nations General Assembly Resolution 192 be transmitted to the Commission for Conventional Armaments for action according to its terms.

The resolution was passed with nine votes, while the Ukrainian SSR and Soviet Union abstained.

== See also ==
- United Nations Security Council Resolution 77
- List of United Nations Security Council Resolutions 1 to 100 (1946–1953)
