= United Nations General Assembly Resolution 31/136 =

UN General Assembly Resolution 31/136
- Date: 16 December 1976
- Meeting no.: 102
- Code: A/RES/31/136 ([ Document])
- Subject: Adopting the period from 1976 to 1985 as the United Nations Decade for Women: Equality, Development and Peace.
- Result: Approved

United Nations General Assembly Resolution 31/136 was a resolution adopted by the UN General Assembly on 16 December 1976. The resolution adopted the period from 1976 to 1985 as the United Nations Decade for Women: Equality, Development and Peace.

== Text ==
The General Assembly,

Considering that in its resolution 3520 (XXX) of 15 December 1975 it proclaimed the period from 1976 to 1985 United Nations Decade for Women: Equality, Development and Peace, to be devoted to effective and sustained national, regional and international action to implement the World Plan of Action for the Implementation of the Objectives of the International Women's Year,/69 and related resolutions/70 adopted by the World Conference of the International Women's Year, held at Mexico City from 19 June to 2 July 1975,

Aware of the importance of developing and implementing without delay a programme of concrete action for the Decade,

Considering further its decision to convene in 1980 a world conference to review and evaluate progress made and, where necessary, readjust existing programmes in the light of new data and research available,

Noting with satisfaction the Programme for the United Nations Decade for Women as adopted by the Commission on the Status of Women at its twenty-sixth session and transmitted to the General Assembly by the Economic and Social Council at its resumed sixty-first session,/71

1. Approves the Programme for the United Nations Decade for Women, which focuses on the first half of the Decade, 1976 to 1980;

2. Urges Governments and United Nations bodies to take all necessary steps to give effect to the Programme for the Decade and to give it priority in view of the real need to attain the goals of the Decade;

3. Calls upon Governments to take measures to ensure equal and effective participation of women in political, economic, social and cultural life and in policy-making at local, national, regional and international levels, thereby increasing their role in international co-operation and in the strengthening of peace;

4. Recommends that Governments should establish machinery, where appropriate, which could include governmental and non-governmental agencies, bureaux and commissions, in order to ensure the effective implementation and evaluation of the World Plan of Action and of the Programme for the Decade within the framework of national development plans and regional policies;

5. Recommends further that Governments, in co-operation with the Secretary-General, the specialized agencies, the regional commissions, appropriate regional and international research centres and institutes as well as appropriate intergovernmental bodies, should undertake the organization of training courses and seminars whereby officials responsible for the formulation and implementation of national development plans would study multidisciplinary techniques and methods which can be utilized in effectively integrating women in development;

6. Invites, as a matter of priority, Governments and organizations and bodies of the United Nations system as well as all governmental and non-governmental organizations concerned and the mass media to undertake massive public information programmes with a view to making all sectors of the population aware of the need to implement fully the Programme for the Decade;

7. Requests the Secretary-General to take fully into account the financial and staff needs required to implement effectively the World Plan of Action and the Programme for the Decade;

8. Requests the Secretary-General to prepare, for the consideration of the General Assembly at its thirty-second session, a report on the measures taken to implement the present resolution, in particular paragraphs 4, 5 and 6 above, as well as a progress report on other measures taken to implement the World Plan of Action and the Programme for the Decade.
