= United Nations General Assembly Resolution 3275 (XXIX) =

UN General Assembly Resolution 3275
- Date: 10 December 1974
- Meeting no.: 2311
- Code: A/RES/29/3275 (Document)
- Subject: Adopting 1975 as a period of intensified action with regard to equal rights and recognition of women.
- Result: Approved

United Nations General Assembly Resolution 29/3275 was a resolution adopted by the UN General Assembly on 10 December 1974. The resolution adopted 1975, International Women's Year, as a period of intensified action with regard to equal rights and recognition of women.

== Text ==
The General Assembly,

Recalling its resolution 3010 (XXVII) of 18 December 1972, in which it proclaimed the year 1975 International Women's Year and decided to devote this year to intensified action:

(a) To promote equality between men and women,

(b) To ensure the full integration of women in the total development effort, especially by emphasizing women's responsibility and important role in economic, social and cultural development at the national, regional and international levels, particularly during the Second United Nations Development Decade,

(c) To recognize the importance of women's increasing contribution to the development of friendly relations and co-operation among States and to the strengthening of world peace,

Recognizing the importance of the implementation at the national, regional and international levels of the Programme for the International Women's Year approved by the Economic and Social Council and annexed to its resolution 1849 (LVI) of 16 May 1974,

Recognizing further that voluntary contributions from Member States, intergovernmental and non-governmental organizations, private foundations and interested individuals, as called for by the Economic and Social Council in its resolution 1850 (LVI) of 16 May 1974, would help significantly to promote the goals and objectives of the International Women's Year,

1. Calls upon Governments, specialized agencies, regional commissions and non-governmental organizations to implement fully the Programme for the International Women's Year as approved by the Economic and Social Council;

2. Recommends that all Member States should include in their national development plans and country programmes, if they have not already done so, goals and projects designed to train and equip women to make a greater contribution to, and to become more fully integrated in, the economic and social life of the nation;

3. Recommends further that Member States should establish, if they have not yet done so, as a priority measure for the International Women's Year, appropriate national machinery to accelerate the integration of women in development and to eliminate discrimination on grounds of sex;

4. Appeals to Member States, intergovernmental and non-governmental organizations, private foundations and interested individuals to give voluntary contributions to the Secretary-General for the International Women's Year, as called for in Economic and Social Council resolution 1850 (LVI).
