= 3010 =

3010 may refer to:

== In general ==
- 3010, a number in the 3000 (number) range
- A.D. 3010, a year of the 4th millennium CE
- 3010 BC, a year in the 4th millennium BCE

== Places ==
- 3010 Ushakov, an asteroid in the Asteroid Belt, the 3010th asteroid registered
- Hawaii Route 3010, a state highway
- Farm to Market Road 3010, a Texas state highway

== Ships with pennant 3010 ==
- German submarine U-3010, a WWII Kriegsmarine submarine
- HMS LST 3010, a British Royal Navy WWII landing ship tank
- USNS 1st Lt. Baldomero Lopez (T-AK-3010), a U.S. Navy cargo ship
- USS DeKalb (ID-3010), a U.S. Navy WWI troopship

== Other uses ==
- United Nations General Assembly Resolution 3010 (1972), resolution to make 1975 the International Women's Year
- Kawasaki MULE 3010, a utility task vehicle

== See also ==
- A3010 (disambiguation)
