= World Conference on Women, 1975 =

UN women's and human rights conference

World Conference on Women, 1975 was held between 19 June and 2 July 1975 in Mexico City, Mexico. It was the first international conference held by the United Nations to focus solely on women's issues and marked a turning point in policy directives. After this meeting, women were viewed as part of the process to develop and implement policy, rather than recipients of assistance. The conference was one of the events established for International Women's Year and led to the creation of both the United Nations Decade for Women and follow-up conferences to evaluate the progress that had been made in eliminating discrimination against women and their equality. Two documents were adopted from the conference proceedings, the World Plan of Action which had specific targets for nations to implement for women's improvement and the Declaration of Mexico on the Equality of Women and Their Contribution to Development and Peace, which discussed how nations foreign policy actions impacted women. It also led to the establishment of the International Research and Training Institute for the Advancement of Women to track improvements and continuing issues and the United Nations Development Fund for Women to provide funding for developmental programs. The conference marked the first time that the parallel Tribune meeting was successful in submitting input to the official meeting and became a catalyst for women's groups to form throughout the world.

== History ==
The World Conference on Women occurred in the 1970s amid the Cold War when geopolitical conflict was controlled based on the interests of the United States or the USSR in various regions throughout the world, polarizing the world into two camps and their respective fields of influence. At a time when the United States had just withdrawn from Vietnam, forty-eight separate conflicts would rock Asia in such places as Afghanistan, Bangladesh, Cambodia, Indonesia, Laos, Myanmar, Pakistan, Sri Lanka. African wars during the end of decolonization in the 1970s turned toward long-lasting civil wars in Angola, Ethiopia-Somali, Mozambique and other African nations, with the superpowers manipulating the conflicts in the background with troops and arms. Decolonization of the Caribbean saw twelve states gain their independence between 1962 and 1983, but simultaneously remain marginalized by pressures from world powers which continued to manipulate local concerns. Two significant Middle East conflicts occurred in 1967 and 1973 with the US backing its Arab allies and Israel, while the USSR backed Arab socialist regimes. In Central and South America various coups d'états in Argentina, Bolivia, Chile, Ecuador, El Salvador and dictatorships led to instability and decimation of indigenous populations.

Responses to the conflict often had additional repercussions, such as the 1973 Oil embargo, a response to the Arab-Israeli conflict, which caused the price of oil to rise on the world market from three dollars per barrel to twelve dollars per barrel. The embargo was followed by the 1979 energy crisis, sparked by concerns over lowered production caused by the Iranian Revolution and how continued instability might impact oil availability. That in turn led to a build up of reserves, during which time the price of oil doubled and forced the world to look at alternative sources of oil. Adding to global tensions were racially and religiously charged conflicts ranging from Apartheid to the Israeli-Palestinian conflict to Paternalism.

Work had long been ongoing by the United Nations Commission on the Status of Women (CSW) to adopt a declaration to eliminate discrimination against women. By 1965, it was believed that enough support had been garnered to obtain passage of a declaration to secure women's human rights. Collating responses covering education, employment, inheritance, penal reform, and other issues, from government actors, NGO representatives and UN staff, CSW delegates began drafting a declaration. On 7 November 1967, the Declaration on the Elimination of Discrimination Against Women (DEDAW), was passed by the General Assembly. In 1972, the United States Congress passed Title IX, eliminating discrimination in education for any institution receiving federal funding. That same year, CSW proposed that DEDAW become a legally binding Convention. To that end, the United Nations proclaimed 1975 as International Women's Year and the CSW set about the tasks to prepare the "machinery" necessary to secure passage. Helvi Sipilä, was selected as the Assistant Secretary General for Social Development and Humanitarian affairs and placed in charge of organizing events. Added significance of the date was that the conference would take place on the thirtieth anniversary of the creation of the United Nations.

=== Official conference ===
When the United Nations designated 1975 as International Women's Year, no conference was planned as part of the celebrations because delegates on opposing sides of the Cold War could not agree to authorize one. Initially proposed by the Romanian delegate of the UN Commission on the Status of Women, communist women joined to filibuster the project, instead proposing a women's congress in East Berlin, which had nothing to do with the United Nations. As a counter, the US proposed a gender neutral conference to be held in Bogotá, Colombia to promote equality for men and women, because the presence of men would legitimize the conference. When Mexico City agreed to host the conference, Princess Ashraf of Iran began collecting funds, and each side mobilized to shape the agenda. The US position advocated for political rights and elimination of discrimination through legal remedies. The Soviet camp advocated for women to be empowered so that they could use their natural abilities as nurturers to stem violence and inequality which created poverty and injustice.

Though Pedro Ojeda Paullada, the Mexican Attorney General, was appointed head of the conference, the majority, 113 of the 133 delegation leaders were women. The conference was a governmental meeting, not a meeting of women, and as such the high percentage of women marked the first time that 73% of the delegates for a UN conference were women, even if the 27% participation by men was higher than the number of women typical at such conferences. The nature of the conference also dictated that all delegates, as representatives of their governments would follow the ideological agendas of their governments, rather than act upon any private convictions. Among the prominent delegates, which many feminists felt were chosen for ideological reasons or ties to prominent male politicians, were Sirimavo Bandaranaike, Prime Minister of Sri Lanka; Anna Louise Beer, chair of the Norwegian National Women's Council; Vilma Espín de Castro, sister-in-law to the Cuban president; Francoise Giroud, French Minister of Women's Affairs; Imelda Marcos, First Lady of the Philippines; Ashraf Pahlavi, twin sister of Iran's shah; Leah Rabin, First Lady of Israel; Elizabeth Anne Reid of Australia; Silvana Maria Rota, Argentine congresswoman; Jehan Sadat, First Lady of Egypt; Soviet Cosmonaut Valentina Tereshkova, the first woman in space; Vida Tomšič, Yugoslavian representative of the Non-Aligned Movement; Khunying Suparb Visessurakarn, vice president of Thailand's National Council on Social Welfare; but not First Lady Betty Ford, as the US administration feared linking the threat of anti-capitalist sentiment with women's issues.

After opening remarks by Kurt Waldheim, President Luis Echeverría of Mexico spoke, stating that women, in their role as mothers, were allies of the oppressed and that "no woman was more discriminated against or exploited than the woman without bread, school or medicines for her children". Setting the stage, Echeverría's comments mirrored the position that the nurturing nature of women could help to solve the world's crises, if marginalization were eliminated. It was agreed that the themes of equality, development and peace were the primary focus of action, as they were international in nature and required simultaneous action by global components. In general discussion it was recognized that to achieve equality and attain the fundamental human rights and freedoms expressed in the Universal Declaration of Human Rights, the inferior status of women had to be addressed to bring about parity in civic, economic, legal, social and political spheres. Recognizing that legal changes alone could not ensure equality, the general discussion agreed that developmental programs made available to both urban and rural women must include women in all decision-making levels, from planning to implementation and analysis, and must provide adequate training. The discussion also recognized the need to monitor advances in women's progress as well a societal change in attitudes toward women via national institutions. In efforts toward peace, the discussion recognized women's contributions to developing friendly international relationships and pressing for disarmament, particularly nuclear disarmament. Increased participation by women in international and regional problem-solving summits, was discussed as a way to maintain peace and security.

The first committee, under the chair Jeanne Martin Cissé of Guinea, with vice-chairs, Gladys Freire de Addiego of Uruguay, Jaroslav Havelka of Czechoslovakia and Nilima Ibrahim of Bangladesh and Rapporteur John Bruce Campbell of Australia discussed the World Plan of Action. The plan, which had previously been drafted by a diverse range of UN committees, established a broad range of targets, considering that national developments were in varying stages, to be accomplished over the next decade (1975–1985). In addition to adopting the overall plan as revised by subcommittees, the first committee evaluating six draft resolutions, which dealt with research and training, international cooperation, women's status, the role of the UN in implementation of the Plan, women's health, and participation of women in future meetings of the UN. All were accepted with either no or minimal modification. The Declaration of Mexico on the Equality of Women and Their Contribution to Development and Peace, was also reviewed by the committee and the draft accepted with minimal or no modification. Some radical feminists, uninterested in reviewing a plan already prepared by UN committees tried to take over a US embassy meeting and yet another group walked out of the conference when Leah Rabin spoke.

The second committee, under the chair Shapour Rassekh of Iran, with vice-chairs, Edmonde Dever of Belgium, Annie Jiagge of Ghana and Anna Papp of Hungary and Rapporteur Phyllis MacPherson-Russell of Jamaica evaluated current trends and obstacles in the roles of men and women to achieving parity in rights, opportunities, and responsibilities; and how women could be integrated into developmental programs. They discussed passage of the Convention on the Elimination of All Forms of Discrimination Against Women (CEDAW) as a critical step in the process. Recognizing the wide gap between the de jure and de facto status of women, the committee noted that to achieve equality changes would need to be made in a broad spectrum of areas including: education, employment opportunity, family, integration into existent systems, and the law. Fifty-eight draft resolutions had been submitted for the committee to review, which covered these areas and they divided them into working groups to reduce duplications. Winnowing down the drafts to twenty-one items which were accepted with modifications, the major areas concerned communications media, education and training, employment, exploitation of women and girls, family health, family planning, family security (including the elderly and disabled), financial assistance, integration to development, political and social participation, and systems to gather, collate and evaluate data on women's status. The committee evaluated seven other drafts having to do with expanding the role of women in peace initiatives and nation rebuilding, and adopted each of them with little or no modification.

=== Tribune ===
The International Women's Year Tribune was a parallel conference scheduled by women to be held simultaneously with the official conference. The format allowed for non-governmental organizations (NGO) to meet and discuss the issues tabled at the official conference, but gave them no authority to take any action. There were around 6,000 delegates who attended the Tribune, organized by Mildred Persinger the UN's YWCA observer, including such women as Domitila Barrios de Chungara, head of the Siglo XX Miners' Union Housewives Committee of Bolivia; Nancy Cárdenas, Mexican lesbian activist; Jacqui Ceballos, former president of the New York chapter of National Organization for Women (NOW); Thelma Daily of the Coalition of Labor Union Women (CLUW); Carole DeSaram, president of the New York NOW Betty Friedan, founder of NOW; Ronnie Feit of the National Women's Political Caucus; Dorothy Haene of the United Auto Workers; Dorothy Height of the National Council of Negro Women; Patricia Budd Kepler of the Harvard Divinity School; Esperanza Martí, director of Fem magazine and a Mexican feminist; Jan Peterson of CLUW; and Margo St. James, founder of COYOTE. The founders of Women's World Banking met as part of the tribunal, including Michaela Walsh, a program associate at the Rockefeller Brothers Fund, who met Ela R. Bhatt, founder of Self-Employed Women's Association of India, and Esther Ocloo, a Ghanaian businesswoman.

The Tribune was held on the opposite side of Mexico City, creating a physical as well as philosophical separation of the two groups. The difference in format stemmed from position that the delegates participated in discussions on official policy; whereas, the NGO tribunal women dealt with means and methods of program implementation to improve women's educational opportunities, equality, economic position and collaboration. The Tribune hosted thirty-six planned meetings and nearly two hundred spontaneously organized additional sessions covering a wide variety of topics from development, education, health, human rights, peace and work to birth control, gender violence, lesbianism, prostitution, racism and sexism. The dynamics of this conference were different from the official UN session because the participants were not governmental representatives, and delegates were free to discuss items openly avoided by the officials. But the free discussion also made apparent the divide separating the women. Westernized women focused on individual freedom, Socialist women focused on the state's obligation to enforce the collective rights of all members of a society, and those from countries not aligned to either of these views pointed to the need for development, economic empowerment, food security and correction of the structural problems in systems.

Women from developing nations pointed out issues such as how aid from industrialized nations was often harmful, as it displaced women practicing subsistence agriculture with technology. Without adequate training to utilize technology, women who had been the prevalent food producers no longer had means to support their families. If they were utilized by new industry, women tended to be exploited as a cheap labor source, as laws for equal pay were non-existent in many developing economies. In light of these survival issues, the demands of others asking for sexual and reproductive health and rights seemed frivolous and indicative of self-indulgence. Socialist women felt that equality could only come with a transformation of geopolitical relationships, which recognized the contributions of all members of society and denounced exploitation and discrimination on any basis. Amid the wide range of views, there were performances aimed at capturing media attention, with some attendees wearing national costumes and others wearing business attire, as well as rhetoric pitting ideologies against each other to gain a spotlight. At one point, frustrated that they could not be part of the official dialogue, a group of radical feminists planned to stage a march through the streets of Mexico City. Instead, a group of fifteen delegates was chosen who presented amendments to Helvi Sipilä requesting that they be given to the official committees. It was the first time that a Tribune had ever been successful in presenting their input to the officials. The amendments the Tribune proposed included establishment of a UN office to monitor success of the Plan, issue annual progress reports, and investigate human rights abuse against women. They also asked for the UN to improve their internal hiring policies so that more women were not only hired, but promoted to management and executive positions.

== Outcomes ==
The conference adopted the official World Plan of Action, as well as the Declaration of Mexico on the Equality of Women and Their Contribution to Development and Peace, which was an indictment of the foreign policies that pushed military or corporatist intervention to coerce developing nations from determining their own path. The Declaration passed with a vote of eighty-nine in favor, three against, and eighteen nations abstaining. The Plan established minimum targets to be attained within the next five years to secure for women the equal access of the mechanisms to attaining equality and eliminating discrimination; to full participation in development and their integration in extant systems; and to their contributions toward world peace and non-aggression. To reach these goals, the conference made education, employment, family planning, health and nutrition, and housing key focal points. The Tribune played a uniting role, by bringing together people of diverse cultures and backgrounds to formulate the means to overcome differences in objective and create pathways for NGOs to participate in the policy-making process. The conference not only encouraged member countries to develop policies which would lead to the improvement of women's lives, but led to the establishment of the United Nations Decade for Women as a means to focus those policies, as well as establishing a series of conferences to follow-up. The first of these would be the Second World Conference on Women to be held in Copenhagen. To assist in advancing women's development with research, operations support and training, the UN created the International Research and Training Institute for the Advancement of Women (INSTRAW) and the United Nations Development Fund for Women (UNIFEM).

For the first time, institutional collection within the UN evaluated the extent of problems and conditions of women in varying nations, specifically separating data by sex to bring to light the level of inequality and discrimination towards women. It was also one of the first international meetings of organized lesbians from multiple countries and cultures. Attitudes within the member nations and the UN itself began to change as a result of the focus on women brought about by the conference. Another benefit of the conference was that it connected women to other women in their struggles. Though in many ways the conference was not as effective in poor and undeveloped countries, because enforcement of the principals established and communication with women was harder in the developing world, there was a surge in women's activists coming together across the globe, as well as governmental understanding of the needs of their constituent women.

== Anti-Zionism and anti-Israel ==
The text of the Mexico Declaration included a denunciation "of colonialism and neo-colonialism, foreign occupation, Zionism, apartheid and racial discrimination in all its forms" a precursor to the highly controversial United Nations General Assembly Resolution 3379, known colloquially as the "Zionism-is-racism" resolution. This debate elicited particularly strong responses from Jewish feminists, including Betty Friedan, Jewish author of the seminal feminist work "The Feminine Mystique" who noted that "anti-Zionist diatribes had been much more dominant at the Mexico City women's conference than at other UN gatherings." American Congresswoman Bella Abzug condemned the resolution, while feminist Lettuce Cottin Pogrebin wrote “I know Zionists who are racists, just as I know racist feminists, but that didn't make Zionism racism any more than a few bigoted women made feminism racism." On the other hand, groups such as Women Against Imperialism viewed the anti-Zionist rhetoric as an essential step towards securing the rights of women around the world.

== See also ==
- Commission on the Status of Women
- United Nations Development Fund for Women
- United Nations International Research and Training Institute for the Advancement of Women
- World Conference on Women, 1980 – Copenhagen, Denmark
- World Conference on Women, 1985 – Nairobi, Kenya
- World Conference on Women, 1995 – Beijing, China
