= United Nations General Assembly Resolution 1631 (XVI) =

UN General Assembly Resolution 1631
- Date: October 27 1961
- Code: A/RES/1631
- Subject: Admission of Mauritania to the United Nations
- Voting summary: 68 voted for; 13 voted against; 20 abstained; 1 present not voting
- Result: Adopted

United Nations General Assembly Resolution 1631 was adopted on October 27, 1961 to admit Mauritania to membership in the United Nations.

The resolution was adopted by a majority of 68 members with 13 opposing, 20 abstaining and Cyprus didn't vote.

== Voting Results ==
The result of the voting was the following:

For	Against	Abstentions
Argentina	Cuba	Afghanistan
Australia	Guinea	Albania
Austria	Iraq	Bulgaria
Belgium	Jordan	Byelorussian SSR
Bolivia	Lebanon	Cambodia
Brazil	Libya	Congo-Léopoldville
Burma	Mali	Czechoslovakia
Cameroon	Morocco	Ghana
Canada	Saudi Arabia	Guatemala
Central African Republic	Sudan	Hungary
Ceylon	Syria	India
Chad	United Arab Republic	Indonesia
Chile	Yemen	Mongolia
China		Nepal
Colombia		Pakistan
Congo-Brazzaville		Poland
Costa Rica		Romania
Dahomey		Ukrainian SSR
Denmark		Soviet Union
Dominican Republic		Yugoslavia
Ecuador		
El Salvador		
Ethiopia		
Federation of Malaya		
Finland		
France		
Gabon		
Greece		
Haiti		
Honduras		
Iceland		
Iran		
Ireland		
Israel		
Italy		
Ivory Coast		
Japan		
Laos		
Liberia		
Luxembourg		
Madagascar		
Mexico		
Netherlands		
New Zealand		
Nicaragua		
Niger		
Nigeria		
Norway		
Panama		
Paraguay		
Peru		
Philippines		
Portugal		
Senegal		
Sierra Leone		
Somalia		
South Africa		
Spain		
Sweden		
Thailand		
Togo		
Tunisia		
Turkey		
United Kingdom		
United States		
Upper Volta		
Uruguay		
Venezuela		
