= United Nations General Assembly Resolution 192 =

UN General Assembly Resolution 192
- Date: November 19 1948
- Meeting no.: 185
- Code: A/RES/192(III) (Document)
- Subject: Armaments: regulation and reduction
- Voting summary: 43 voted for; 6 voted against; 1 abstained
- Result: Adopted

United Nations General Assembly Resolution 192, adopted on November 19, 1948, resolved that the nuclear powers of the permanent security council members publish reports regarding their nuclear capabilities for the purpose of allowing a more informed nuclear disarmament.

The resolution was passed with 43 yes votes, 6 no votes, 1 abstention, and 8 states who did not participate.

The resolution was later followed up on in the Security Council with United Nations Security Council Resolution 68, United Nations Security Council Resolution 77, and United Nations Security Council Resolution 78.

== See also ==
- United Nations Security Council Resolution 68
- United Nations Security Council Resolution 77
- United Nations Security Council Resolution 78
- United Nations Commission on Conventional Armaments
