= List of United Nations General Assembly Resolutions adopted at its 1st Session =

This is a list of resolutions adopted by the United Nations General Assembly during its 1st session held in 1946-1947.

Resolution No.	Date	Vote	Topic
1	24 January 1946	47-0-0	Establishment of a Commission to Deal with the Problems Raised by the Discovery of Atomic Energy
2	1 February 1946	without vote	Rules of procedure concerning languages
3	13 February 1946	without vote	Extradition and punishment of war criminals
4	14 February 1946	32-6-11	Representation of non-governmental bodies on the Economic and Social Council
5	29 January 1946	without vote	Matters covered by chapter III, section 1A, paragraph 4 (b) and (d), paragraph 5 (b) and (c), paragraph 1, 2, 3, 6 and 7 and section 1B of the report of the Preparatory Commission
6	1 February 1946	without vote	United Nations Relief and Rehabilitation Administration (UNRRA)
7	29 January 1946	without vote	Matters covered by chapter III, section 1A, paragraph 4 (a), (c) and (e), paragraph 5 (a), paragraph 1, 2, 3, 6 and 7 and section 1B of the report of the Preparatory Commission
8	12 February 1946	42-0-0	Question of refugees
9	9 February 1946	41-0-0	Non self-governing peoples
10	9 February 1946	41-0-0	Provisional rules of procedure of the Trusteeship Council
11	24 January 1946	47-0-0	Terms of appointment of the Secretary-General
12	1 February 1946	without vote	Appointment of temporary staff
13	13 February 1946	37-0-0	Organization of the Secretariat
14	13 February 1946	without vote	Budgetary and financial arrangements
15	13 February 1946	without vote	Amendments to the provisional rules of procedure
16	13 February 1946	without vote	Appointment of a Committee on Contributions
17	26 January 1946		Amendments to the provisional rules of procedure
18	13 February 1946	without vote	Committee structure of the General Assembly
19	6 February 1946	without vote	Emoluments of judges of the International Court of Justice
20	6 February 1946	without vote	Pensions of the judges and staff of the International Court of Justice
21	10 February 1946	without vote	Steps necessary for convening the International Court of Justice
22	13 February 1946		Privileges and immunities of the United Nations
23	10 February 1946	without vote	Registration of treaties and international agreements
24	12 February 1946	without vote	Transfer of certain functions, activities and assets of the Leagues of Nations
25	14 February 1946	without vote	Question of the Headquarters of the United Nations
26	26 January 1946	without vote	Establishment of two ad hoc committees
27	14 February 1946	without vote	World shortage of cereals
28	2 February 1946	without vote	Reconstruction of countries Members of the United Nations devastated by war
29	9 February 1946	without vote	Date of the next meeting of the General Assembly
30	9 February 1946	without vote	Applications from nationals of non-member States for permanent employment with the international Secretariat
31	9 February 1946	without vote	Organization of an international press conference
32	9 February 1946	46-0-2	Relations of members of the United Nations with Spain
33	13 February 1946	42-0-0	Terms of office of members of Council
34	9 November 1946	unanimously	Admission of Afghanistan, Iceland and Sweden to membership in the United Nations
35	19 November 1946	unanimously	Question of the re-examination by the Security Council of certain applications for admission to membership in the United Nations
36	19 November 1946	32-9-1	Rules governing the admission of new Members to the United Nations
37	11 December 1946	unanimously	Report of the Security Council
38	11 December 1946	unanimously	Draft Declaration on the Rights and Duties of States
39	12 December 1946	34-6-13	Relations of Members of the United Nations with Spain
40	13 December 1946	36-6-9	Voting procedure in the Security Council
41	14 December 1946	unanimously	Principles governing the general regulation and reduction of armaments
42	14 December 1946	36-6-4	Information on armed forces to be supplied by Members of the United Nations
43	11 December 1946	unanimously	Draft Declaration on Fundamental Human Rights and Freedoms
44	8 December 1946	32-15-7	Treatment of Indians in the Union of South Africa
45	11 December 1946	unanimously	World shortage of cereals and other foodstuffs
46	11 December 1946	unanimously	Economic reconstruction of devastated areas
47	11 December 1946	unanimously	Report of the Committee on UNRRA (United Nations Relief and Rehabilitation Administration)
48	11 December 1946	unanimously	Relief needs after the termination of UNRRA (United Nations Relief and Rehabilitation Administration)
49	15 December 1946		Activities of the Economic and Social Council
50	14 December 1946	44-0-5	Agreements with specialized agencies
51	14 December 1946	unanimously	Transfer to the United Nations of certain non-political functions and activities of the League of Nations, other than those pursuant to international agreements
52	14 December 1946	unanimously	Provision of expert advice by the United Nations to Member States
53	14 December 1946	unanimously	Housing and town planning
54	19 November 1946	unanimously	Transfer to the United Nations of powers exercised by the League of Nations under the international agreements, conventions and protocols on narcotic drugs
55	19 November 1946	unanimously	National Red Cross and Red Crescent societies
56	11 December 1946	unanimously	Political rights of women
57	11 December 1946	unanimously	Establishment of an International Children's Emergency Fund
58	14 December 1946	unanimously	Transfer to the United Nations of the advisory social welfare functions of UNRRA (United Nations Relief and Rehabilitation Administration)
59	14 December 1946	unanimously	Calling of an International Conference on Freedom of Information
60	14 December 1946	unanimously	Translation of the classics
61	14 December 1946	unanimously	Establishment of the World Health Organization
62	15 December 1946	30-5-18	Refugees and displaced persons
63	13 December 1946	41-6-5	Approval of Trusteeship Agreements
64	14 December 1946	unanimously	Establishment of the Trusteeship Council
65	14 December 1946	37-0-9	Future status of South West Africa
66	14 December 1946	27-7-13	Transmission of information under Article 73 e of the Charter
67	14 December 1946	31-1-21	Regional conferences of representatives of Non-Self-Governing Territories
68	14 December 1946	unanimously	Budgets of the United Nations for the financial years 1946 and 1947
69	14 December 1946	unanimously	Scale of contributions to the budgets of the United Nations for the financial years 1946 and 1947 and to the Working Capital Fund
70	19 November 1946	unanimously	Travelling expenses of members of commissions of the Economic and Social Council
71	19 November 1946	unanimously	Utilization by UNESCO (United Nations Educational, Scientific and Cultural Organization) of the property rights of the League of Nations in the International Institute of Intellectual Co-operation
72	19 November 1946	unanimously	Membership of the Advisory Committee on Administrative and Budgetary Questions
73	7 December 1946	unanimously	Election of three members of the Committee on Contributions and term of office of members elected to the Committee
74	7 December 1946	unanimously	Appointment of external auditors
75	7 December 1946	unanimously	Simultaneous interpretation system
76	7 December 1946	unanimously	Privileges and immunities of the staff of the Secretariat of the United Nations
77	7 December 1946	unanimously	Date of the regular session of the General Assembly
78	7 December 1946	unanimously	Tax equalization
79	7 December 1946	unanimously	Transfer of the assets of the League of Nations
80	11 December 1946	unanimously	Provisional Financial Regulations of the United Nations
81	14 December 1946	unanimously	Budgetary and financial relationships with specialized agencies
82	15 December 1946	unanimously	Provisional Scheme for Staff Retirement and Insurance Funds and related Benefits
83	15 December 1946	30-5-18	Financial provisions (Article 10 and annex II) of the Draft Constitution of the International Refugee Organization
84	11 December 1946	unanimously	Agreement between the United Nations and the Carnegie Foundation concerning the use of the premises of the Peace Palace at the Hague, and concerning the repayment of loans
85	11 December 1946	unanimously	Administration of the International Court of Justice
86	11 December 1946	unanimously	Pensions of the members of the International Court of Justice
87	9 November 1946	unanimously	Changes in the provisional rules of procedures of the General Assembly concerning the terms of office of members elected to councils
88	19 November 1946	unanimously	Application of Articles 11 and 12 of the Statute of the International Court of Justice
89	11 December 1946	unanimously	Authorization of the Economic and Social Council to request advisory opinions of the International Court of Justice
90	11 December 1946	unanimously	Privileges and immunities of members of the International Court of Justice, the Registrar, officials of the registry, assessors, the agents and counsel of the parties and of witnesses and experts
91	11 December 1946	unanimously	Conditions on which Switzerland may become a party to the International Court of Justice
92	7 December 1946	unanimously	Official seal and emblem of the United Nations
93	11 December 1946	unanimously	Accessions to the Convention on the Privileges and Immunities of the United Nations
94	11 December 1946	unanimously	Progressive development of international law and its codification
95	11 December 1946	unanimously	Affirmation of the principles of international law recognized by the Charter of the Nurnberg Tribunal
96	11 December 1946	unanimously	The crime of genocide
97	14 December 1946	unanimously	Registration and publication of treaties and international agreements: regulations to give effects to Article 102 of the Charter of the United Nations
98	14 December 1946	unanimously	Interim arrangement on the privileges and immunities of the United Nations concluded with the Swiss Federal Council and Agreement Concerning the Ariana Site
99	14 December 1946	50-0-1	Arrangements required as a result of the establishment of the permanent Headquarters of the United Nations in the United States of America
100	14 December 1946	46-7-0	Headquarters of the United Nations
101	15 December 1946	unanimously	Admission of Siam to membership in the United Nations
102	15 December 1946	43-8-0	Measures to economize the time of the General Assembly
103	19 November 1946	unanimously	Persecution and discrimination
