= United Nations General Assembly Resolution 500 (V) =

UN General Assembly Resolution 500
- Date: May 18th 1951
- Meeting no.: 330
- Code: A/RES/500 (V) (Document)
- Subject: Additional measures to be employed to meet the aggression in Korea (Resolution adopted on the report of the First Committee)
- Voting summary: 47 voted for; None voted against; 8 abstained; 5 present not voting
- Result: Adopted

The United Nations General Assembly Resolution 500 was approved on May 18, 1951, recommending a trade embargo on the People’s Republic of China and North Korea, in response to the intervention of Chinese troops in Korean War.

== Background ==
In late 1950, hundreds of thousands of Chinese troops crossed into North Korea to help the troops of North Korea to fight the coalition led by United States and South Korea.

On February 1, 1951, the United Nations General Assembly Resolution 498 was passed, condemning the aggression of the People's Republic of China. This was followed by Report A/1802 of the United Nations General Assembly First Committee, containing the draft resolution which was considered by the General Assembly at its 330th plenary meeting on May 18, 1951; the resolution was passed with 47 votes to nil, with 8 abstentions and 5 nations not voting.

== The resolution in summary ==
The resolution recommended that all nations impose a trade embargo of weapons, ammunition and implements of war, as well as the means of their productions, along with atomic energy materials, petroleum, and transportation of strategic value, to areas under the control of the Central People's Government of the People's Republic of China and of the Government of North Korea.

== The voting in detail ==
For

- Argentina
- Australia
- Belgium
- Bolivia
- Brazil
- Canada
- Chile
- China
- Colombia
- Costa Rica
- Cuba
- Denmark
- Dominican Republic
- Ecuador
- El Salvador
- Ethiopia
- France
- Greece
- Guatemala
- Haiti
- Honduras
- Iceland
- Iran
- Iraq
- Israel
- Lebanon
- Liberia
- Luxembourg
- Mexico
- Netherlands
- New Zealand
- Nicaragua
- Norway
- Panama
- Paraguay
- Peru
- Philippines
- Saudi Arabia
- Thailand
- Turkey
- Union of South Africa
- United Kingdom of Great Britain and Northern Ireland
- United States of America
- Uruguay
- Venezuela
- Yemen
- Yugoslavia

Against

- None

Abstentions

- Afghanistan
- Burma
- Egypt
- Indonesia
- India
- Pakistan
- Sweden
- Syria

Present Not Voting

- Byelorussian Soviet Socialist Republic
- Czechoslovakia
- Poland
- Ukrainian Soviet Socialist Republic
- Union of Soviet Socialist Republics

== Aftermath ==
The trade embargo imposed by the resolution forced the People’s Republic of China to rely on economic assistances from the Eastern Bloc, and later on economic self-sufficiency. Meanwhile, the embargo forced the then-British Colony of Hong Kong to transition its economy, from an entrepôt between China and the West, to an exporter of locally manufactured goods.

After the Korean Armistice Agreement in 1953, nations gradually lifted their trade embargo against the People’s Republic of China; for the United States, the lifting of the embargo was announced by President Richard Nixon in 1971.

== See also ==
- United Nations General Assembly resolution
- United Nations Security Council resolution
