= United Nations General Assembly Resolution 62/167 =

UN General Assembly Resolution 62/167
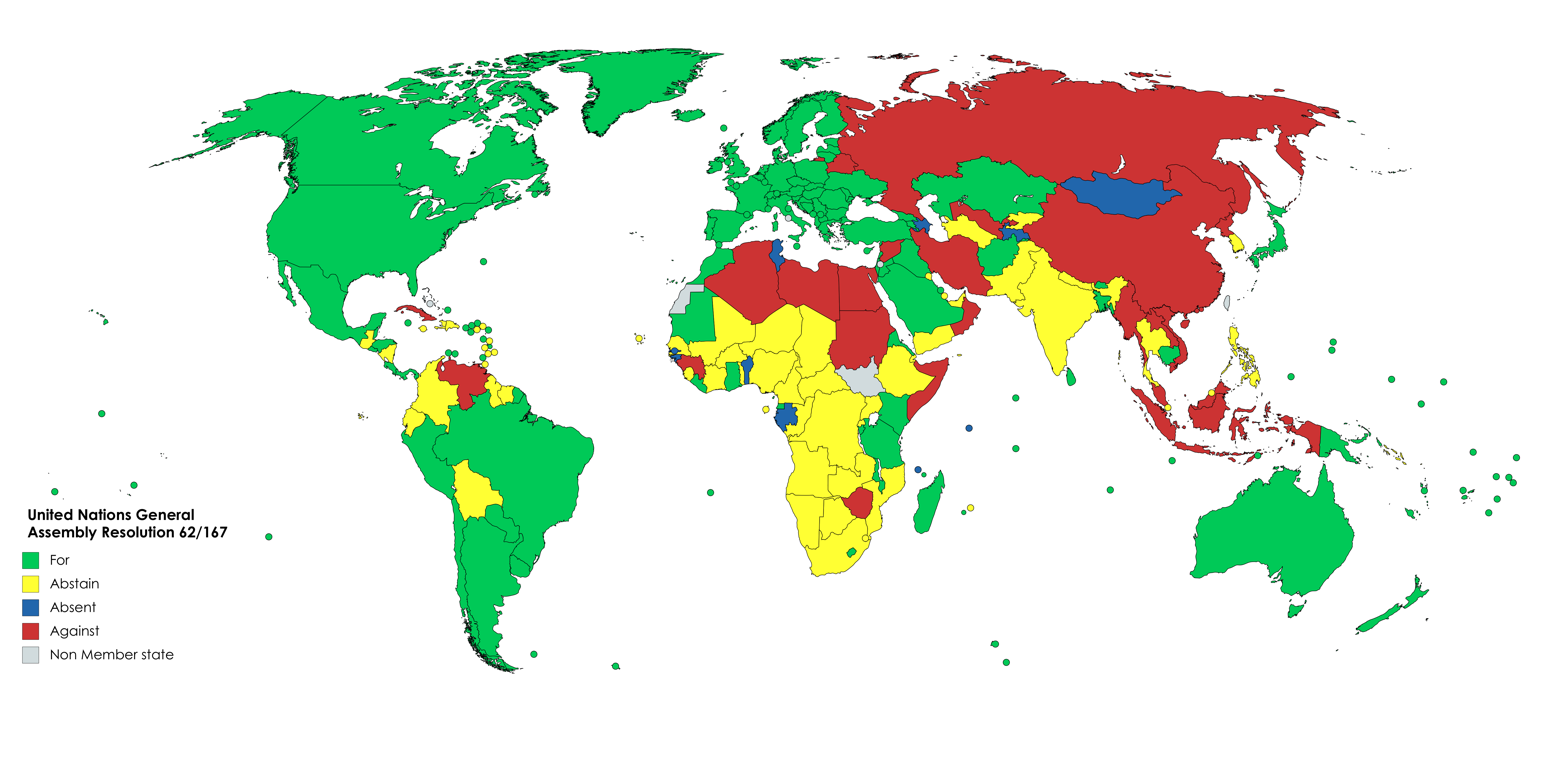
Results of the United Nations General Assembly vote about the situation of Human Rights in the Democratic People's Republic of the Korea.
In favour
Against
Abstained
Absent
Non-UN member
- Date: 18 December 2007
- Meeting no.: 76th Plenary
- Code: A/RES/62/167 (Document)
- Subject: Situation of Human Rights in the Democratic People's Republic of Korea
- Voting summary: 101 voted for; 22 voted against; 59 abstained; 10 absent
- Result: Resolution adopted

United Nations General Assembly Resolution 62/167, titled "Situation of Human Rights in the Democratic People's Republic of Korea", is a resolution of the United Nations General Assembly about the situation in North Korea, which was adopted on December 18, 2007, at the 62nd session of the General Assembly. In the resolution, the United Nations General Assembly expresses serious concern at the persistence of the systematic, widespread and grave violations of human rights in North Korea, urging the Government of North Korea to respect fully all human rights and fundamental freedoms.

== Voting ==
Vote	Quantity	States
Approve	101	Afghanistan, Albania, Andorra, Argentina, Armenia, Australia, Austria, Bahamas, Bahrain, Bangladesh, Belgium, Belize, Bhutan, Bosnia and Herzegovina, Brazil, Bulgaria, Burundi, Cambodia, Canada, Chile, Costa Rica, Croatia, Cyprus, Czech Republic, Denmark, El Salvador, Equatorial Guinea, Eritrea, Estonia, Fiji, Finland, France, Georgia, Germany, Ghana, Greece, Grenada, Honduras, Hungary, Iceland, Iraq, Republic of Ireland, Israel, Italy, Japan, Jordan, Kazakhstan, Kenya, Kiribati, Latvia, Lebanon, Lesotho, Liberia, Liechtenstein, Lithuania, Luxembourg, Madagascar, Malawi, Maldives, Malta, Marshall Islands, Mauritania, Mexico, Micronesia (Federated States of), Moldova, Monaco, Montenegro, Morocco, Nauru, Netherlands, New Zealand, Norway, Palau, Panama, Papua New Guinea, Paraguay, Peru, Poland, Portugal, Romania, Samoa, San Marino, Saudi Arabia, Serbia, Slovakia, Slovenia, Spain, Sri Lanka, Sweden, Switzerland, North Macedonia, East Timor, Tonga, Turkey, Tuvalu, Ukraine, United Kingdom, Tanzania, United States, Uruguay, Vanuatu
Reject	22	Algeria, Belarus, China, Cuba, Democratic People's Republic of Korea, Egypt, Guinea, Indonesia, Iran (Islamic Republic of), Lao People's Democratic Republic, Libyan Arab Jamahiriya, Malaysia, Myanmar, Oman, Russian Federation, Somalia, Sudan, Syrian Arab Republic, Uzbekistan, Venezuela (Bolivarian Republic of), Viet Nam, Zimbabwe
Abstain	59	Angola, Antigua and Barbuda, Barbados, Bolivia, Botswana, Brunei Darussalam, Burkina Faso, Cameroon, Cape Verde, Central African Republic, Chad, Colombia, Côte d'Ivoire, Democratic Republic of the Congo, Djibouti, Dominica, Dominican Republic, Ecuador, Ethiopia, Guatemala, Guyana, Haiti, India, Jamaica, Kuwait, Kyrgyzstan, Mali, Mauritius, Mozambique, Namibia, Nepal, Nicaragua, Niger, Nigeria, Pakistan, Philippines, Qatar, Republic of the Congo, Republic of Korea, Rwanda, Saint Kitts and Nevis, Saint Lucia, Saint Vincent and the Grenadines, São Tomé and Príncipe, Senegal, Sierra Leone, Singapore, Solomon Islands, South Africa, Suriname, Swaziland (since 2018 renamed to Eswatini), Thailand, Togo, Trinidad and Tobago, Turkmenistan, Uganda, United Arab Emirates, Yemen, Zambia
Absent	10	Azerbaijan, Benin, Comoros, Gabon, Gambia, Guinea-Bissau, Mongolia, Seychelles, Tajikistan, Tunisia
Total	192	–

== Controversy in South Korea ==
Former Foreign Minister Song Min-soon, in his memoir, has claimed that Seoul abstained from the vote on the UN resolution about North Korea's human rights situation after hearing Pyongyang's opinion. His disclosure of the inappropriate communication provoked a huge controversy in South Korean politics.

== See also ==
- Human rights in North Korea
- Human experimentation in North Korea
- Human trafficking in North Korea
