= United Nations General Assembly resolution =

A United Nations General Assembly resolution is a decision or declaration voted on by all member states of the United Nations in the UN General Assembly.

General Assembly resolutions usually require a simple majority (more yes votes than no votes) to pass. However, if the General Assembly determines that the issue is an "important question" by a simple majority vote, then a two-thirds majority (twice as many yes votes as no votes) is required; "important questions" are those that deal significantly with the maintenance of international peace and security, admission of new members to the United Nations, suspension of the rights and privileges of membership, the expulsion of members, operation of the trusteeship system, or budgetary questions.

Although General Assembly resolutions are generally non-binding for member states, internal resolutions may be binding on the operation of the General Assembly itself, for example with regard to budgetary and procedural matters.

== Select list of General Assembly resolutions ==
- 1946
  - Resolution 1: Established the United Nations Atomic Energy Commission (UNAEC) "to deal with the problems raised by the discovery of atomic energy" and tasked to "make specific proposals... for the elimination from national armaments of atomic weapons and of all other major weapons adaptable to mass destruction", among other issues regarding nuclear technology.
  - Resolution 39: Relations of Members of the United Nations with Francoist Spain.
  - Resolution 40: Voting procedure in the Security Council.
  - Resolution 64: Establishment of the Trusteeship Council.
  - Resolution 95: Affirmation of the principles of international law recognized by the Charter of the Nuremberg Tribunal
  - Resolution 96: The crime of Genocide.
  - Resolution 100: Headquarters of the United Nations.
- 1947
  - Resolution 177: International Law Commission was directed to "formulate the principles of international law recognized in the Charter of the Nuremberg Tribunal and in the judgment of the Tribunal". This resulted in the creation of the Nuremberg Principles.
  - Resolution 181: The 1947 UNGA 'Partition resolution' regarding the British Mandate of Palestine.
- 1948
  - Resolution 192: Requested that nuclear powers publish reports on their capabilities to aid nuclear disarmament.
  - Resolution 194: Calls for the "Right of return" for Palestinian refugees.
  - Resolution 217: Universal Declaration of Human Rights
  - Resolution 260: Convention on the Prevention and Punishment of the Crime of Genocide.
- 1949
  - Resolution 273: Admits the State of Israel to membership in the United Nations.
  - Resolution 289: On the Question of the disposal of the former Italian colonies: recommending that Libya should be independent not later than 1 January 1952
  - Resolution 303: On the Question of an international regime for the Jerusalem area and the protection of the Holy Places: restated the United Nations' stance on corpus separatum for Jerusalem.
- 1950
  - Resolution 377 A: The "Uniting for Peace" Resolution
- 1951
  - Resolution 498: calling on the People's Republic of China to cease all hostilities on the Korean Peninsula... its armed forces continue their invasion of Korea and their large-scale attacks upon United Nations forces there...has itself engaged in aggression in Korea
  - Resolution 500: Recommend general trade embargo against People's Republic of China and North Korea for their aggression in Korea
- 1952
  - Resolution 505: Threats to the political independence and territorial integrity of China (Republic of China) and to the peace of the Far East, resulting from Soviet violations of the Sino-Soviet Treaty of Friendship and Alliance of 14 August 1945 and from Soviet violations of the Charter of the United Nations
- 1955
  - Resolution 977(X): Establishing the United Nations Memorial Cemetery in Busan, South Korea, for United Nations Command casualties of the Korean War.
- 1956
  - Resolution 997(ES-I): Question considered by the Security Council at its 749th and 750th meetings, held on 30 October 1956. (see also: Suez Crisis)
- 1960
  - Resolution 1514: Declaration on the granting of independence to colonial countries and peoples.
  - Resolution 1541: United Nations definition of what a colony is, and what self-determination is. Principles which should guide Members in determining whether or not an obligation exists to transmit the information called for under Article 73 e of the Charter.
- 1962
  - Resolution 1761: Recommended sanctions against South Africa in response to the governments policy of apartheid.
- 1963
  - Resolution 1962: One of the earliest resolutions governing Outer space.
  - Resolution 1991: Amended the UN Charter, enlarging the Security Council to fifteen members.
- 1966
  - Resolution 21/2200: International Covenant on Civil and Political Rights
- 1968
  - Resolution 22/2373: Treaty on the Non-Proliferation of Nuclear Weapons, adopted to prevent the spread of nuclear weapons
- 1970
  - Resolution 25/625: Declaration on Principles of International Law concerning Friendly Relations, systemizing principles regarding international law and right to self-determination
- 1971
  - Resolution 2758: Expelled the collective representatives of Chiang Kai-shek and replaced it with the representatives of People's Republic of China. It also recognized the PRC as the sole legal authority of China. (See China and the United Nations)
- 1972
  - Resolution 3010: Adopted to make the year 1975 International Women's Year.
- 1973
  - Resolution 3068: International Convention on the Suppression and Punishment of the Crime of Apartheid adopted and opened for signature, and ratification by Resolution 3068, 30 November 1973, and entered into force on 18 July 1976.
- 1974
  - Resolution 3275: Adopted 1975, International Women's Year, as a period of intensified action with regards to equal rights and recognition of women.
  - Resolution 3314: Defined wars of aggression.
- 1975
  - Resolution 3379: Zionism is a form of racism and racial discrimination; revoked by Resolution 46/86.
  - Resolution 3520: Adopted the World Plan of Action and related resolutions from the International Women's Year Conference.
- 1976
  - Resolution 31/72: Adopted the 1977 Environmental Modification Convention
  - Resolution 31/136: Adopted the period from 1976 to 1985 as the United Nations Decade for Women: Equality, Development and Peace.
- 1978
  - Resolution 33/75: Urges the Security Council, especially its permanent members, to take all necessary measures for ensuring UN decisions on the maintenance of international peace and security. United States and Israel were the only no votes.
- 1979
  - Resolution 34/37: Deplored Moroccan occupation of Western Sahara and urged to terminate it.
- 1989
  - Resolution 44/34: The UN Mercenary Convention
- 1991
  - Resolution 46/86: revoked Resolution 3379.
- 1992
  - Resolution 47/90, made 16 December 1992: the first of a series of resolutions concerning cooperatives in social development listed in Resolution 62/128 (see below).
- 1993
  - Resolution 47/121: condemned ethnic cleansing of the Bosnian Muslims by the Bosnian Serbs as genocide, (fourteen years later the International Court of Justice ruled in the Bosnian Genocide Case of 2007, that ethnic cleansing was not enough in itself to be genocide, but that there must also be intent to kill a substantial part of the targeted group by the perpetrators).
- 1998
  - Resolution 53/176 on action against corruption and bribery in international commercial transactions, 15 December 1998
- 2000
  - Resolution 54/205: Prevention of corrupt practices and illegal transfer of funds, 27 January 2000. This resolution was a follow-on to Resolution 53/176 of 15 December 1998.
  - Resolution 55/56: Introduced a process to certify the origin of rough diamonds from sources that are conflict-free
- 2003
  - Resolution 57/306: Investigation into sexual exploitation of refugees by aid workers in West Africa, calling for strengthened oversight, accountability, and preventive measures within UN operations.
  - Resolution 58/76 on the Model Legislative Provisions on Privately Financed Infrastructure Projects of the United Nations Commission on International Trade Law, recommended adoption of work undertaken in this specialist field by UNCITRAL.
- 2005
  - Resolution 60/7: designated the International Holocaust Remembrance Day
- 2006
  - Resolution 60/251: Establishment of the United Nations Human Rights Council, replacing the former criticized UN Commission on Human Rights
  - Resolution 61/106: Adopted the Convention on the Rights of Persons with Disabilities.
- 2007
  - Resolution 61/295: Establishes the Declaration on the Rights of Indigenous Peoples.
  - Resolution 61/255: Condemned without any reservation any denial of the Holocaust
  - Resolution 62/149: Called for a universal moratorium on capital punishment with a view to total abolition, and in the meantime, respect for the rights of those on death row. Calls on states which have abolished the death penalty not to reintroduce it.
  - Resolution 62/167: Expressed serious concern about human rights in North Korea.
- 2008
  - Resolution 62/63: Criminal Accountability of UN Officials and Experts on Mission.
  - Resolution 62/128: Cooperatives in social development, adopted having recalled the following earlier resolutions on the same subject: resolutions 47/90 of 16 December 1992, 49/155 of 23 December 1994, 51/58 of 12 December 1996, 54/123 of 17 December 1999, 56/114 of 19 December 2001, 58/131 of 22 December 2003 and 60/132 of 16 December 2005.
- 2012
  - Resolution 67/19: Recognizing the State of Palestine as a non-member observer state.
- 2014
  - Resolution 68/262: Territorial integrity of Ukraine.
- 2015
  - Resolution 69/292: Development of an international legally-binding instrument under the United Nations Convention on the Law of the Sea on the conservation and sustainable use of marine biological diversity of areas beyond national jurisdiction.
  - Resolution 70/1: Transforming our world: the 2030 Agenda for Sustainable Development
- 2017
  - Resolution ES-10/19: Status of Jerusalem
  - Resolution 71/256: New Urban Agenda, establishes a global framework for sustainable urban development until 2036
- 2018
  - Resolution 72/191: "Situation of Human Rights in the Syrian Arab Republic"
  - Resolution 73/5: Palestine is granted enhanced privileges in General Assembly work and sessions when it assumes 2019 Group of 77 chair.
  - Resolution ES-10/20: "Illegal Israeli actions in Occupied East Jerusalem and the rest of the Occupied Palestinian Territory" and "Protection of the Palestinian civilian population"
- 2022
  - Resolution ES-11/1: Aggression against Ukraine
  - Resolution ES-11/2: Humanitarian consequences of the aggression against Ukraine
  - Resolution ES-11/3: Suspension of the rights of membership of the Russian Federation in the Human Rights Council
  - Resolution 76/262: Standing mandate for a General Assembly debate when a veto is cast in the Security Council
  - Resolution ES-11/4: Territorial integrity of Ukraine: defending the principles of the Charter of the United Nations
  - Resolution ES-11/5: Furtherance of remedy and reparation for aggression against Ukraine
- 2023
  - Resolution ES-11/6: Principles of the Charter of the United Nations underlying a comprehensive, just and lasting peace in Ukraine
  - Resolution ES-10/21: Illegal Israeli actions in Occupied East Jerusalem and the rest of the Occupied Palestinian Territory
  - Resolution ES-10/22: Protection of civilians and upholding legal and humanitarian obligations
- 2025
  - Resolution ES-11/7: Advancing a comprehensive, just and lasting peace in Ukraine
  - Resolution ES-11/8: The Path to Peace
- 2026
  - Resolution 80/250: Declares the trafficking of enslaved Africans as Crime against Humanity
  - Resolution 80/307: Encouragement for the widespread adoption of the Equal Earth projection maps.

== See also ==
- United Nations Security Council resolution
