= United Nations General Assembly Resolution 1991 (XVIII) =

UN General Assembly Resolution 1991
- Date: 17 December 1963
- Meeting no.: 1,285
- Code: A/RES/1991 (XVIII) (Document)
- Subject: Question of equitable representation on the Security Council and the Economic and Social Council
- Result: Approved

United Nations General Assembly Resolution 1991 was a resolution adopted by the UN General Assembly on 17 December 1963. The resolution made provisions for amending the United Nations Charter in order to increase membership of the Security Council to fifteen member states and membership of the Economic and Social Council to twenty-seven member states. As per Article 108 of the UN Charter, the agreed amendments to the Charter took effect after the resolution was ratified by two-thirds of the UN member states' legislatures, including those of all five permanent members of the Security Council.

== Text ==
A

The General Assembly,

Considering that the present composition of the Security Council is inequitable and unbalanced,

Recognizing that the increase in the membership of the United Nations makes it necessary to enlarge the membership of the Security Council, this providing for a more adequate geographical representation of non-permanent members and making it a more effective organ for carrying out its functions under the Charter of the United Nations,

Bearing in mind the conclusions and recommendations of the Committee on arrangements for a conference for the purpose of reviewing the Charter,

1. Decides to adopt, in accordance with Article 108 of the Charter of the United Nations, the following amendments to the Charter and to submit them for ratification by the States Members of the United Nations:

(a) In Article 23, paragraph 1, the word “eleven” in the first sentence shall be replaced by the word “fifteen”, and the word “six” in the third sentence by the word “ten”;

(b) In Article 23, paragraph 2, the second sentence shall then be reworded as follows:

“In the first election of the non-permanent members after the increase of the membership of the Security Council from eleven to fifteen, two of the members shall be chosen for a term of one year”;

(c) In Article 27, paragraph 2, the word “seven” shall be replaced by the word “nine”;

(d) In Article 27, paragraph 3, the word “seven” shall be replaced by the word “nine”;

2. Calls upon all Member States to ratify the above amendments, in accordance with their respective constitutional processes, by 1 September 1965;

3. Further decides that the ten non-permanent members of the Security Council shall be elected according to the following pattern:

(a) Five from African and Asian States;
(b) One from Eastern European States;
(c) Two from Latin American States;
(d) Two from Western European and other States.

B

The General Assembly,

Recognizing that the increase in the membership of the United Nations makes it necessary to enlarge the membership of the Economic and Social Council, with a view to providing for a more adequate geographical representation therein and making it a more effective organ for carrying out its functions under Chapters IX and X of the Charter of the United Nations,

Recalling Economic and Social Council resolutions 974 B and C (XXXVI) of 22 July 1963,

Bearing in mind the conclusions and recommendations of the Committee on arrangements for a conference for the purpose of reviewing the Charter,

1. Decides to adopt, in accordance with Article 108 of the Charter of the United Nations, the following amendment to the Charter and to submit it for ratification by the States Members of the United Nations:

“Article 61

“1. The Economic and Social Council shall consist of twenty-seven Members of the United Nations elected by the General Assembly.

“2. Subject to the provisions of paragraph 3, nine members of the Economic and Social Council shall be elected each year for a term of three years. A retiring member shall be eligible for immediate re-election.

“3. At the first election after the increase in the membership of the Economic and Social Council from eighteen to twenty-seven members, in addition to the members elected in place of the six members whose term of office expires at the end of that year, nine additional members shall be elected. Of these nine additional members, the term of office of three members so elected shall expire at the end of one year, and of three other members at the end of two years, in accordance with arrangements made by the General Assembly.

“4. Each member of the Economic and Social Council shall have one representative.”;

2. Calls upon all Member States to ratify the above amendment, in accordance with their respective constitutional processes, by 1 September 1965;

3. Further decides that, without prejudice to the present distribution of seats in the Economic and Social Council, the nine additional members shall be elected according to the following pattern:

(a) Seven from African and Asian States;
(b) One from Latin American States;
(c) One from Western European and other States.

== Voting ==
The result of the voting was the following:

For	Against	Abstentions
Afghanistan	Bulgaria	Portugal
Albania	Byelorussian SSR	South Africa
Algeria	Cuba	United Kingdom
Argentina	Czechoslovakia	United States
Australia	France	
Austria	Hungary	
Belgium	Mongolia	
Bolivia	Poland	
Brazil	Romania	
Burma	Ukrainian SSR	
Burundi	Soviet Union	
Cambodia		
Cameroon		
Canada		
Central African Republic		
Ceylon		
Chad		
China		
Colombia		
Congo-Brazzaville		
Congo-Léopoldville		
Costa Rica		
Cyprus		
Dahomey		
Denmark		
Dominican Republic		
Ecuador		
El Salvador		
Ethiopia		
Finland		
Gabon		
Ghana		
Greece		
Guatemala		
Guinea		
Haiti		
Honduras		
Iceland		
India		
Indonesia		
Iran		
Iraq		
Ireland		
Israel		
Italy		
Ivory Coast		
Jamaica		
Japan		
Jordan		
Kenya		
Kuwait		
Laos		
Lebanon		
Liberia		
Libya		
Luxembourg		
Madagascar		
Malaysia		
Mali		
Mauritania		
Mexico		
Morocco		
Nepal		
Netherlands		
New Zealand		
Nicaragua		
Niger		
Nigeria		
Norway		
Pakistan		
Panama		
Paraguay		
Peru		
Philippines		
Rwanda		
Saudi Arabia		
Senegal		
Sierra Leone		
Somalia		
Spain		
Sudan		
Sweden		
Syria		
Tanganyika		
Thailand		
Togo		
Trinidad and Tobago		
Tunisia		
Turkey		
Uganda		
United Arab Republic		
Upper Volta		
Uruguay		
Venezuela		
Yemen		
Yugoslavia		
