= United Nations Security Council Resolution 78 =

UN Security Council Resolution 78
- Date: October 18 1949
- Meeting no.: 452
- Code: S/1410 (Document)
- Subject: Armaments: regulation and reduction
- Voting summary: 9 voted for; None voted against; 2 abstained
- Result: Adopted

Security Council composition
- Permanent members: China; France; Soviet Union; United Kingdom; United States
- Non-permanent members: Argentina; Canada; Cuba; Egypt; Norway; Ukrainian SSR

United Nations Security Council Resolution 78, adopted on October 18, 1949, having received and examined the proposals contained in the working document on the implementation of United Nations General Assembly Resolution 192, adopted by the United Nations Commission on Conventional Armaments the Council requested the Secretary-General transmit these proposals and the records of the discussion on this question in the Council and the Commission for Conventional Armaments to the General Assembly.

The resolution was adopted with nine votes in favour and two abstentions from the Ukrainian SSR and Soviet Union.

== See also ==
- List of United Nations Security Council Resolutions 1 to 100 (1946–1953)
