= A3010 =

A3010 may refer to:

- A3010 road, one of the A roads in Zone 3 of the Great Britain numbering scheme
- Acorn Archimedes A3010 personal computer
- OnePlus 3T A3010 smartphone
- Shizuoka Railway A3000 series electrical multiple unit train A3010
- GMDD GP40-2LW A3010, a locomotive of the Belfast and Moosehead Lake Railroad (1871–2007)

== See also ==
- 3010 (disambiguation)
