= United Nations General Assembly Resolution 3520 (XXX) =

UN General Assembly Resolution 30/3520
- Date: 15 December 1975
- Meeting no.: 2441
- Code: A/RES/30/3520 (XXX.) (Document)
- Subject: Adopting the World Plan of Action and related resolutions from the International Women's Year Conference.
- Result: Approved

United Nations General Assembly Resolution 30/3520 (XXX.) was a resolution adopted by the UN General Assembly on 15 December 1975. The resolution adopted the World Plan of Action and related resolutions from the International Women's Year World Conference on Women which was held in Mexico City earlier in the year.

== Text ==
The General Assembly,

Recalling its resolution 3010 (XXVII) of 18 December 1972 in which it proclaimed the year 1975 International Women's Year,

Recalling also Economic and Social Council resolutions 1849 (LVI) and 1851 (LVI) of 16 May 1974 on the convening of an international conference during the International Women's Year as a focal point of the international observance of the Year,

Recalling further its resolutions 3276 (XXIX) and 3277 (XXIX) of 10 December 1974 as well as Economic and Social Council resolution 1959 (LIX) of 28 July 1975 concerning the World Conference of the International Women's Year,

Recalling the importance of the participation of women in the implementation of the decisions of the General Assembly at its sixth and seventh special sessions as well as in the implementation of the Programme of Action on the Establishment of a New International Economic Order,

Having considered the report of the World Conference of the International Women's Year, held at Mexico City from 19 June to 2 July 1975,

Having considered also the note by the Secretary-General on the establishment of an international research and training institute for the advancement of women,

Convinced that the Conference, through the adoption of the Declaration of Mexico on the Equality of Women and Their Contribution to Development and Peace, 1975, the World Plan of Action for the Implementation of the Objectives of the International Women's Year and related resolutions, has made a valuable and constructive contribution towards the achievement of the threefold objectives of the Year, namely, to promote equality between men and women, to ensure the full integration of women in the total development effort and to promote women's contribution to the development of friendly relations and co-operation among States and to the strengthening of world peace,

Considering the valuable and constructive contributions towards the implementation of the threefold objectives of the International Women's Year made by conferences and seminars held during the Year,

Convinced also that the promotion of development objectives and the solution of crucial world economic and social problems should contribute significantly to the improvement of the situation of women, in particular that of women in rural areas and in low-income groups,

Convinced further that women must play an important role in the promotion, achievement and maintenance of international peace,

Considering that the decisions and recommendations of the Conference should be translated into concrete action without delay by States, organizations of the United Nations system and intergovernmental and non-governmental organizations,

Recalling that the Conference stressed the important role of regional commissions in the implementation of the World Plan of Action, and related resolutions of the Conference,

Convinced that periodic and comprehensive reviews and appraisals of the progress made in meeting the goals of the World Plan of Action and related resolutions endorsed by the Conference are of crucial importance (or their effective implementation and should be undertaken at regular intervals by Governments and by the organizations of the United Nations system within an agreed time frame,

Noting that the Conference recommended the continuing operation of the Commission on the Status of Women or some other representative body, within the structure of the United Nations, designed specifically to deal with matters relating to the status of women, so as to en sure the implementation of ongoing projects designed to carry out the programmes set forth in the World Plan of Action,

1. Takes note of the report of the World Conference of the International Women's Year, including the Declaration of Mexico on the Equality of Women and Their Contribution to Development and Peace, 1975, the World Plan of Action for the Implementation of the Objectives of the International Women's Year, the regional plans of action and the resolutions and other recommendations adopted by the Conference, and endorses the action proposals contained in these documents;

2. Proclaims the period from 1976 to 1985 United Nations Decade for Women: Equality,. Development and Peace, to be devoted to effective and sustained national, regional and international action to implement the World Plan of Action and related resolutions of the Conference;

3. Calls upon Governments, as a matter of urgency, to examine the recommendations contained in the World Plan of Action and related resolutions of the Conference including action to be taken at the national level, such as:

(a) The establishment of short-term, medium-term and long-term targets, and priorities to this end, taking into account the guidelines set forth in sections I and II of the World Plan of Action, including the minimum objectives recommended for achievement by 1980;

(b) The adoption of national strategies, plans and programmes for the implementation of the recommendations within the framework of over-all development plans, policies and programmes;

(c) The undertaking of regular reviews and appraisals of progress made at the national and local levels in achieving the goals and objectives of the World Plan of Action within the framework of over-all development plans, policies and programmes;

4. Requests the Secretary-General to transmit to the relevant organs of the United Nations and to the organizations of the United Nations system the decisions and recommendations of the Conference;

5. Invites all relevant organizations of the United Nations system concerned:

(a) To submit, within the framework of the Administrative Committee on Co-ordination, to the Economic and Social Council at its sixty-second session their proposals and suggestions for implementing the World Plan of Action and related resolutions of the Conference during the United Nations Decade for Women: Equality, Development and Peace;

(b) To develop and implement, during the first half of the Decade, under the auspices of the Administrative Committee on Co-ordination, a joint interagency medium-term programme for the integration of women in development, which should co-ordinate and integrate activities undertaken in accordance with subparagraph (a) above, with special emphasis on technical co-operation in programmes relating to women and development;

(c) To render, in accordance with requests of Governments, sustained assistance in the formulation, design, implementation and evaluation of projects and programmes which would enable women to be integrated in national and international development;

6. Calls upon the regional commissions to develop and implement, as a matter of priority, effective strategies to further the objectives of the World Plan of Action at the regional and subregional levels, bearing in mind their respective regional plans of action;

7. Urges all financial institutions and all international, regional and subregional development banks and bilateral funding agencies to accord high priority in their development assistance, in accordance with requests of Governments, to projects that would promote the integration of women in the development process, in particular women in the rural areas, as well as the achievement of the equality of women and men, priority being given to countries with limited financial means;

8. Urges non-governmental organizations, at the national and international levels, to take all possible measures to assist in the implementation of the World Plan of Action and related resolutions of the Conference within their particular areas of interest and competence;

9. Decides in principle, in accordance with resolution 26 adopted by the Conference, to establish, under the auspices of the United Nations, an International Research and Training Institute for the Advancement of Women, which would be financed through voluntary contributions and would collaborate with appropriate national, regional and international economic and social research institutes;

10. Invites the Secretary-General therefore to appoint, with due consideration to the principle of equitable geographical distribution, a Group of Experts on the Establishment of an International Research and Training Institute for the Advancement of Women. consisting of five to ten experts, to draw up, in consultation with the representatives of existing regional centres and/or institutes for research and training which have similar objectives and goals, the terms of reference and structural organization of the institute, giving special consideration to the needs of women of developing countries, and requests the Secretary-General to report to the Economic and Social Council at its sixtieth session on the basis of the recommendations of the Group of Experts;

11. Affirms that a system-wide review and appraisal of the World Plan of Action should be undertaken biennially, and that such reviews and appraisals should constitute an input to the process of review and appraisal of progress made under the International Development Strategy for the Second United Nations Development Decade, taking into account the Programme of Action on the Establishment of a New International Economic Order and the decisions resulting from the sixth and seventh special sessions of the General Assembly;

12. Affirms that the General Assembly and other relevant bodies should also consider biennially the progress achieved in the promotion of the full equality of women with men in all spheres of life in accordance with international standards and, in particular, the participation of women in political life and in international co-operation and the strengthening of international peace;

13. Expresses the hope that the Ad Hoc Committee on the Restructuring of the Economic and Social Sectors of the United Nations System, which will consider the report of the Group of Experts on the Structure of the United Nations System entitled A New United Nations Structure for Global Economic Co-operation, will take full account of the need to implement the World Plan of Action and related resolutions of the Conference, as well as the requirements of the United Nations Decade for Women: Equality, Development and Peace, and appeals to the Ad Hoc Committee to ensure that the machinery designed to deal with questions relating to women should be strengthened, taking into account, in particular, the role of the Commission on the Status of Women and the procedures established for the system-wide review and appraisal of the World Plan of Action;

14. Decides to include in the provisional agenda of its thirty-first session an item entitled "United Nations Decade for Women: Equality, Development and Peace";

15. Invites the Secretary-General to submit a progress report to the General Assembly at its thirty-first session on the measures taken to implement the World Plan of Action and related resolutions of the Conference, and on the progress achieved in initiating the procedures for the Plan's review and appraisal by Member States, the United Nations organs, the regional commissions, the specialized agencies and other intergovernmental organizations concerned;

16. Requests the Secretary-General to ensure, if possible within existing resources, that the Secretariat unit responsible for women's questions possesses adequate personnel and budgetary resources in order to discharge its functions under the World Plan of Action in co-operation with all organizations of the United Nations system;

17. Further requests the Secretary-General, in the light of paragraph 16 above, to take into account the requirements of the World Plan of Action and related resolutions of the Conference in preparing revised estimates for 1977 and the medium-term plan for 19781981 and to report thereon to the General Assembly at its thirty-first session, in accordance with established procedures;

18. Urges all States, the organizations of the United Nations system and intergovernmental and non-governmental organizations concerned, as well as the mass communications media, to give widespread publicity to the achievements and significance of the Conference at the national, regional and international levels;

19. Requests the Secretary-General, as a matter of high priority, to issue within existing resources, in the official languages of the United Nations, a simplified version of the World Plan of Action as a booklet, which would highlight the targets, goals and main recommendations for action by Governments, the United Nations system and non-governmental organisations and which would explain the relevance of the implementation of the Plan to the daily lives of men and women throughout the world;

20. Decides to convene in 1980, at the mid-term of the United Nations Decade for Women: Equality, Development and Peace, a world conference of all States to review and evaluate the progress made in implementing the objectives of the International Women's Year as recommended by the World Conference of the International Women's Year and, where necessary, to readjust existing programmes in the light of new data and research available.
