= United Nations Security Council Resolution 77 =

UN Security Council Resolution 77
- Date: October 11 1949
- Meeting no.: 450
- Code: S/1403 (Document)
- Subject: Armaments: regulation and reduction
- Voting summary: 9 voted for; None voted against; 2 abstained
- Result: Adopted

Security Council composition
- Permanent members: China; France; Soviet Union; United Kingdom; United States
- Non-permanent members: Argentina; Canada; Cuba; Egypt; Norway; Ukrainian SSR

United Nations Security Council Resolution 77, adopted on 11 October 1949, having received and examined the second progress report of the Commission for Conventional Armaments, the Council directed the Secretary-General to transmit the report, along with its annexes, accompanying resolution and a record of the Council’s consideration of the subject to the General Assembly for its information.

The resolution was adopted with nine votes in favour and two abstentions from the Ukrainian SSR and Soviet Union.

== See also ==
- United Nations Security Council Resolution 18
- United Nations Security Council Resolution 78
- List of United Nations Security Council Resolutions 1 to 100 (1946–1953)
