= United Nations General Assembly Resolution 1 (I) =

United Nations General Assembly Resolution 1 was the first resolution passed by the United Nations General Assembly on 24 January 1946, which created the United Nations Atomic Energy Commission to "deal with the problems raised by the discovery of atomic energy", and commissioned to "make specific proposals... for the elimination from national armaments of atomic weapons and of all other major weapons adaptable to mass destruction", among other issues regarding nuclear technology."
