= United Nations General Assembly Resolution 498 (V) =

UN General Assembly Resolution 498
- Date: February 1st 1951
- Meeting no.: 327
- Code: A/RES/498 (V) (Document)
- Subject: Intervention of the Central People's Government of the People's Republic of China in Korea
- Voting summary: 44 voted for; 7 voted against; 9 abstained
- Result: Adopted

The United Nations General Assembly Resolution 498 was approved on 1 February 1951, in response to the intervention of Chinese Communist troops in the Korean War.

It was the first time in which United Nations treated a nation as an aggressor.

== Background ==
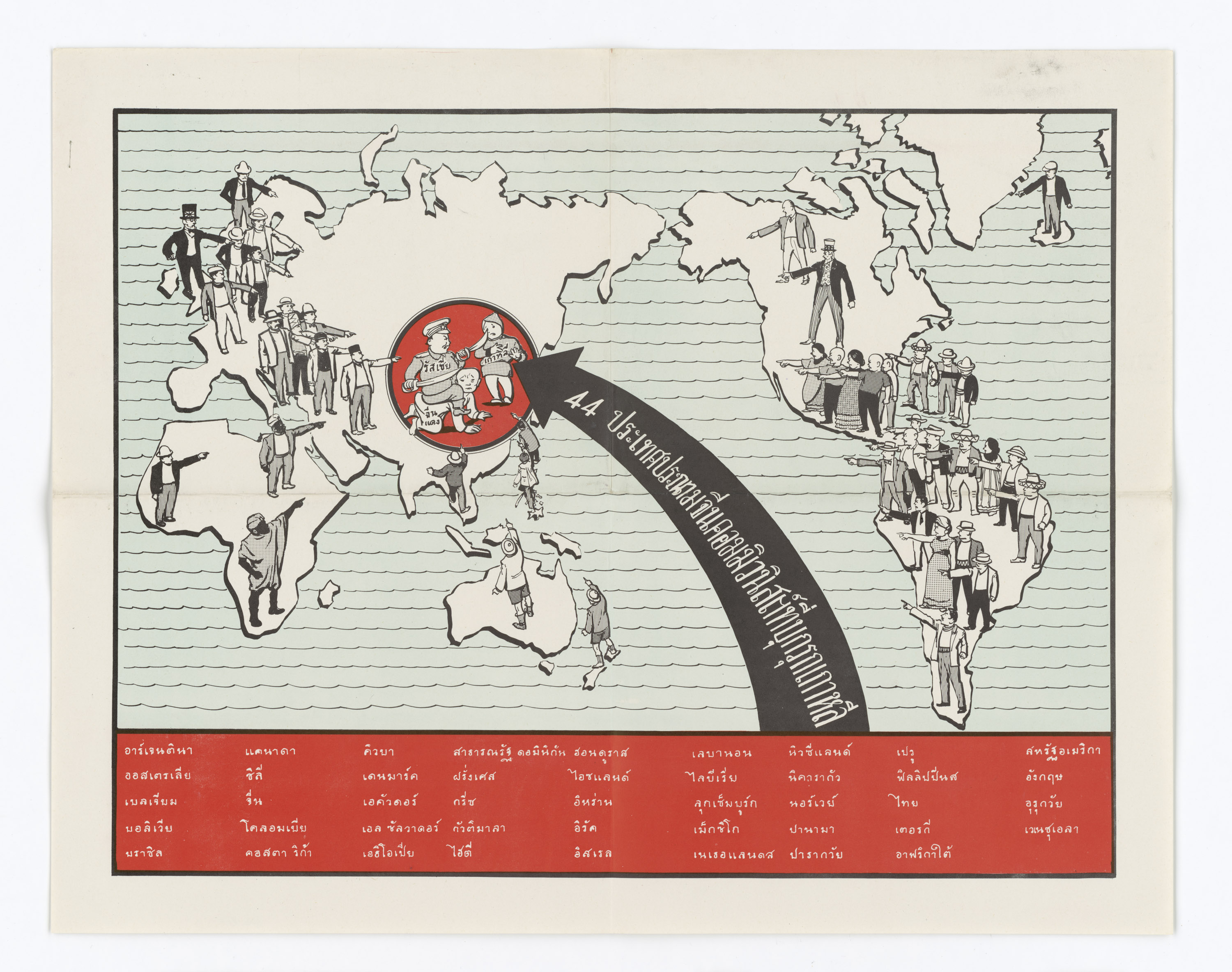
Poster of 1951 (produced by the American government) allusive to the resolution. The text is in Thai. The text in the arrow translates "44 nations condemn red China". The names of the countries that approved the resolution appeared.

In late 1950, hundreds of thousands of Chinese Communist troops crossed into North Korea to help the troops of the Democratic People's Republic of Korea to fight the coalition led by United States and the Republic of Korea.

The United Nations General Assembly (UNGA) vote followed unsuccessful attempts by the U.S. delegation to the United Nations to have the United Nations Security Council (UNSC) take action against the Chinese Communists. Exercising his nation's veto power, the Soviet representative on the Security Council consistently blocked the U.S. effort. Turning to the General Assembly, the U.S. delegation called for the United Nations to condemn communist China as an aggressor in Korea.

== The resolution in few words ==
The resolution had 3 main points:

- The aggression of the People's Republic of China is condemned
- The Chinese troops are exhorted to leave Korea
- The United Nations member states are exhorted to continue supporting the U.N. troops in Korea

== The voting in detail ==
For

- Argentina
- Australia
- Belgium
- Bolivia
- Brazil
- Canada
- Chile
- China
- Colombia
- Costa Rica
- Cuba
- Denmark
- Dominican Republic
- Ecuador
- El Salvador
- Ethiopia
- France
- Greece
- Guatemala
- Haiti
- Honduras
- Iceland
- Iran
- Iraq
- Israel
- Lebanon
- Liberia
- Luxembourg
- Mexico
- Netherlands
- New Zealand
- Nicaragua
- Norway
- Panama
- Paraguay
- Peru
- Philippines
- Thailand
- Turkey
- Union of South Africa
- United Kingdom of Great Britain and Northern Ireland
- United States of America
- Uruguay
- Venezuela

Against

- Burma
- Byelorussian Soviet Socialist Republic
- Czechoslovakia
- India
- Poland
- Ukrainian Soviet Socialist Republic
- Union of Soviet Socialist Republics

Abstentions

- Afghanistan
- Egypt
- Indonesia
- Pakistan
- Saudi Arabia
- Sweden
- Syria
- Yemen
- Yugoslavia

== Aftermath ==
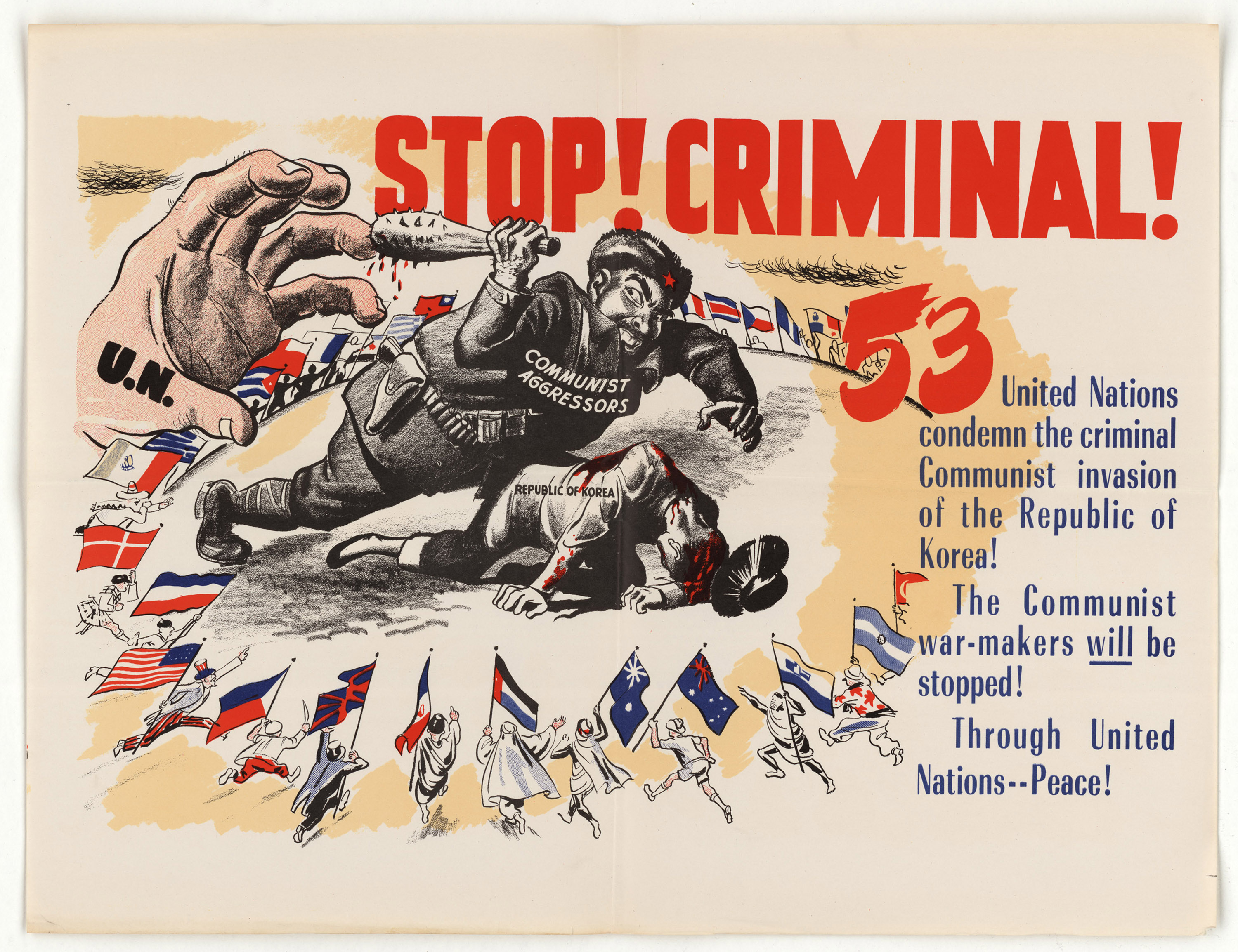
Poster of the time (produced by the American government) allusive to the resolution. In this poster, the number of countries that condemned red China is 53 (which includes the abstaining countries), when the right number is 44.

The action was largely symbolic, because many nations were reluctant to take more forceful action against the People's Republic of China for fear that the conflict in Korea would escalate. While economic and political sanctions could have been brought against Red China, the United Nations decided to take no further action. The Korean War continued for 2 more years, finally resulting in a stalemate and an armistice in 1953. No peace treaty has been signed; and the Korean conflict remains a frozen conflict, which has occasionally flared, such as in the 1966–1969 DMZ Conflict.

== See also ==
- Korean War
- United Nations General Assembly resolution
- United Nations Security Council resolution
