= United Nations Security Council Resolution 18 =

United Nations Security Council resolution

UN Security Council Resolution 18
- Date: February 13 1947
- Meeting no.: 105
- Code: S/RES/18 (Document)
- Subject: Armaments: Regulation and reduction
- Voting summary: 10 voted for; None voted against; 1 abstained
- Result: Adopted

Security Council composition
- Permanent members: China; France; Soviet Union; United Kingdom; United States
- Non-permanent members: Australia; Belgium; Brazil; Colombia; Poland; Syria

United Nations Security Council Resolution 18 was adopted on 13 February 1947.

According to General Assembly Resolution 41, the Council established the Commission on Conventional Armaments, which focused on regulating and reducing global armaments and armed forces to strengthen international peace.

Resolution 18 passed with ten votes to none. The Soviet Union abstained.
