= United Nations Zionism is Racism Resolution =

UNGA resolution adopted in 1975, revoked in 1991

UN General Assembly Resolution 3379
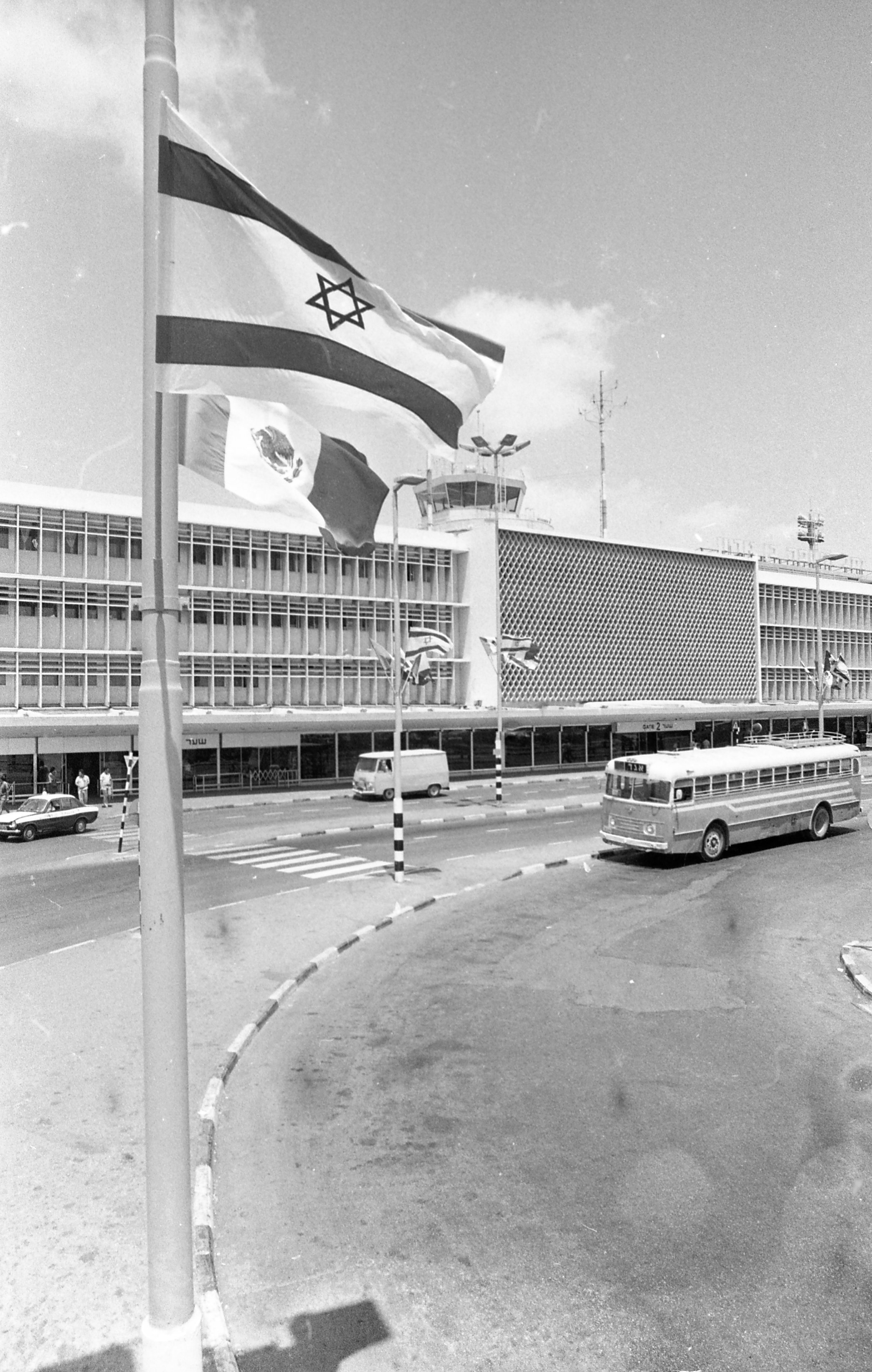
- Flag of Israel
- Date: 10 November 1975
- Meeting no.: 2400
- Code: A/RES/3379 (Document)
- Subject: Elimination of all forms of racial discrimination
- Voting summary: 72 voted for; 35 voted against; 32 abstained
- Result: Adopted, but revoked on 16 December 1991

The United Nations Zionism is Racism Resolution, formally General Assembly Resolution 3379 was a 1975 resolution which determined "that Zionism is a form of racism and racial discrimination". The resolution was adopted on 10 November 1975 with 72 votes in favour, 35 votes against, and 32 abstentions. It was revoked by Resolution 46/86, adopted on 16 December 1991 with 111 votes in favour, 25 votes against, and 13 abstentions, after its revocation had been set by Israel as a precondition for its entry into the Madrid Conference of 1991 peace talks.

The vote for Resolution 3379 was held nearly one year after the adoption of Resolution 3236 and Resolution 3237: the former recognized the "Question of Palestine" and invited the Palestine Liberation Organization (PLO) to participate in international diplomacy; and the latter designated the PLO as a non-member Assembly observer following the "Olive Branch Speech" by Palestinian political leader Yasser Arafat.

In the context of the Declaration on the Elimination of All Forms of Racial Discrimination, adopted on 10 November 1963, Resolution 3379 officially condemned the national ideology of the State of Israel. It was sponsored by the Arab League and a number of Muslim-majority countries, and was chiefly supported by in-favour votes from the Second World and many African countries. Israel, which had been granted United Nations membership in 1949, voted against Resolution 3379 and subsequently condemned it, and was chiefly supported by the First World.

== Background ==
=== Jewish nationalism in Palestine ===
In July 1920, at the San Remo conference, a Class "A" League of Nations mandate over Palestine was allocated to the British. The preamble of the mandate document declared:

Whereas the Principal Allied Powers have also agreed that the Mandatory should be responsible for putting into effect the declaration originally made on November 2nd, 1917, by the Government of His Britannic Majesty, and adopted by the said Powers, in favour of the establishment in Palestine of a national home for the Jewish people, it being clearly understood that nothing should be done which might prejudice the civil and religious rights of existing non-Jewish communities in Palestine, or the rights and political status enjoyed by Jews in any other country.

=== UN Partition Plan for Palestine ===
On 29 November 1947, the UN General Assembly adopted a resolution recommending "to the United Kingdom, as the mandatory Power for Palestine, and to all other Members of the United Nations the adoption and implementation, with regard to the future government of Palestine, of the Plan of Partition with Economic Union" as Resolution 181 (II). The plan contained a proposal to terminate the British Mandate for Palestine and partition Palestine into "independent Arab and Jewish States and the Special International Regime for the City of Jerusalem." On 14 May 1948, the day on which the British Mandate over Palestine expired, the Jewish People's Council gathered at the Tel Aviv Museum, and approved a proclamation which declared the establishment of a Jewish state in Eretz Israel, to be known as the State of Israel.

On 11 May 1949, Israel was admitted to membership in the United Nations.

== Text of Resolution 3379 ==
The full text of Resolution 3379:

3379 (XXX). Elimination of all forms of racial discrimination

The General Assembly,

Recalling its resolution 1904 (XVIII) of 20 November 1963, proclaiming the United Nations Declaration on the Elimination of All Forms of Racial Discrimination, and in particular its affirmation that "any doctrine of racial differentiation or superiority is scientifically false, morally condemnable, socially unjust and dangerous" and its expression of alarm at "the manifestations of racial discrimination still in evidence in some areas in the world, some of which are imposed by certain Governments by means of legislative, administrative or other measures",

Recalling also that, in its resolution 3151 G (XXVIII) of 14 December 1973, the General Assembly condemned, inter alia, the unholy alliance between South African racism and zionism,

Taking note of the Declaration of Mexico on the Equality of Women and Their Contribution to Development and Peace 1975, proclaimed by the World Conference of the International Women's Year, held at Mexico City from 19 June to 2 July 1975, which promulgated the principle that "international co-operation and peace require the achievement of national liberation and independence, the elimination of colonialism and neo-colonialism, foreign occupation, zionism, apartheid and racial discrimination in all its forms, as well as the recognition of the dignity of peoples and their right to self-determination",

Taking note also of resolution 77 (XII) adopted by the Assembly of Heads of State and Government of the Organization of African Unity at its twelfth ordinary session, held at Kampala from 28 July to 1 August 1975, which considered "that the racist regime in occupied Palestine and the racist regime in Zimbabwe and South Africa have a common imperialist origin, forming a whole and having the same racist structure and being organically linked in their policy aimed at repression of the dignity and integrity of the human being",

Taking note also of the Political Declaration and Strategy to Strengthen International Peace and Security and to Intensify Solidarity and Mutual Assistance among Non-Aligned Countries, adopted at the Conference of Ministers for Foreign Affairs of Non-Aligned Countries held at Lima from 25 to 30 August 1975, which most severely condemned zionism as a threat to world peace and security and called upon all countries to oppose this racist and imperialist ideology,

Determines that Zionism is a form of racism and racial discrimination.

== Votes of Resolution 3379 ==
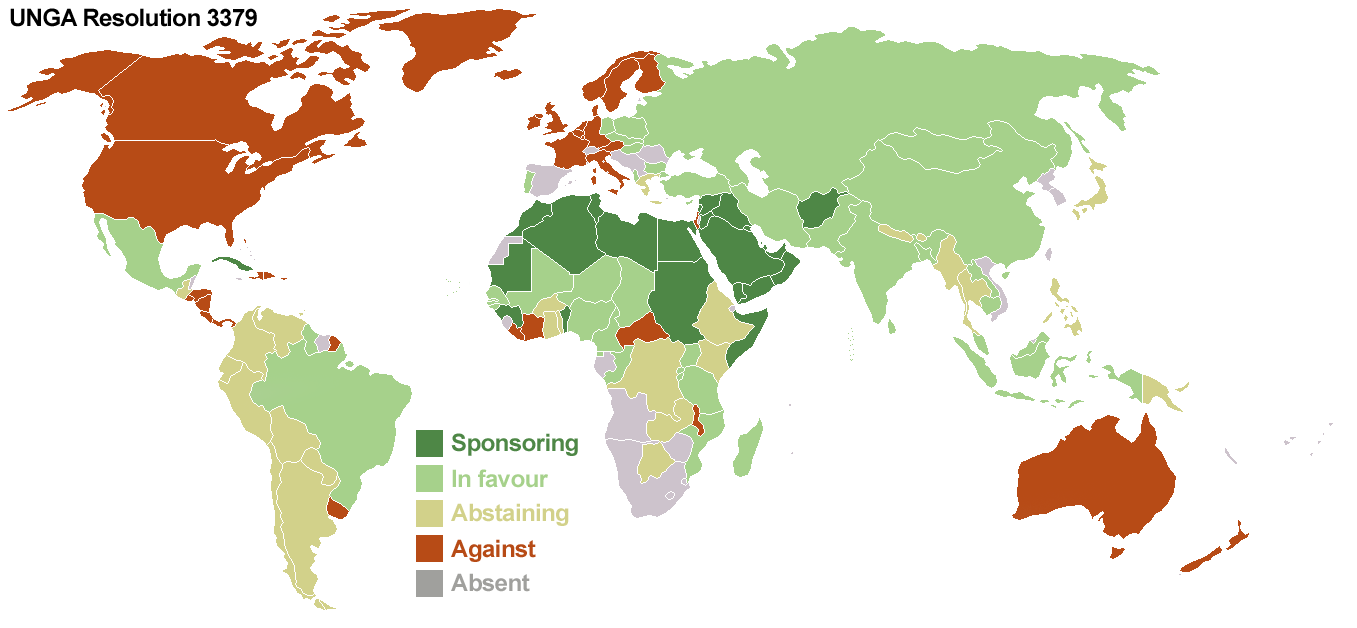
Voting record

| In favour (72) 25 states sponsoring | Abstaining (32) | Against (35) |
|---|---|---|
| Afghanistan; Albania; Algeria; Bahrain; Bangladesh; Brazil; Bulgaria; Burundi; Byelorussian SSR; Cameroon; Cape Verde; Chad; China; Congo; Cuba; Cyprus; Czechoslovakia; Dahomey; South Yemen; Egypt; Equatorial Guinea; The Gambia; East Germany; Grenada; Guinea; Guinea-Bissau; Guyana; Hungary; India; Indonesia; Iran; Iraq; Jordan; Kampuchea; Kuwait; Laos; Lebanon / Libya; Madagascar; Malaysia; Maldives; Mali; Malta; Mauritania; Mexico; Mongolia; Morocco; Mozambique; Niger; Nigeria; Oman; Pakistan; Poland; Portugal; Qatar; Rwanda; São Tomé and Príncipe; Saudi Arabia; Senegal; Somalia; Soviet Union; Sri Lanka; Sudan; Syria; Tunisia; Turkey; Uganda; Ukrainian SSR; United Arab Emirates; Tanzania; Yemen; Yugoslavia | Argentina; Bhutan; Bolivia; Botswana; Burma; Chile; Colombia; Ecuador; Ethiopia; Gabon; Ghana; Greece; Guatemala; Jamaica; Japan; Kenya; Lesotho; Mauritius; Nepal; Papua New Guinea; Paraguay; Peru; Philippines; Sierra Leone; Singapore; Thailand; Togo; Trinidad and Tobago; Upper Volta; Venezuela; Zaire; Zambia | Australia; Austria; Bahamas; Barbados; Belgium; Canada; Central African Republic; Costa Rica; Denmark; Dominican Republic; El Salvador; Fiji; Finland; France; West Germany; Haiti; Honduras; Iceland; Ireland; Israel; Italy; Ivory Coast; Liberia; Luxembourg; Malawi; Netherlands; New Zealand; Nicaragua; Norway; Panama; Swaziland; Sweden; United Kingdom; United States; Uruguay |
Source: United Nations Bibliographic Information System

== Response ==
=== Israel ===
In his address to the United Nations General Assembly the same day, 10 November 1975, Israeli Ambassador Chaim Herzog stated:

"I can point with pride to the Arab ministers who have served in my government; to the Arab deputy speaker of my Parliament; to Arab officers and men serving of their own volition in our border and police defense forces, frequently commanding Jewish troops; to the hundreds of thousands of Arabs from all over the Middle East crowding the cities of Israel every year; to the thousands of Arabs from all over the Middle East coming for medical treatment to Israel; to the peaceful coexistence which has developed; to the fact that Arabic is an official language in Israel on a par with Hebrew; to the fact that it is as natural for an Arab to serve in public office in Israel as it is incongruous to think of a Jew serving in any public office in an Arab country, indeed being admitted to many of them. Is that racism? It is not! That ... is Zionism."

Herzog ended his statement, while holding a copy of the resolution, with these words:

"For us, the Jewish people, this resolution based on hatred, falsehood and arrogance, is devoid of any moral or legal value. For us, the Jewish people, this is no more than a piece of paper and we shall treat it as such."

As he concluded his speech, Herzog tore the resolution in half.

The name of the "UN Avenue" in Haifa, Jerusalem and Tel Aviv was switched to the "Zionism Avenue" as a response to the UN's decision.

=== United States ===
Before the vote, Daniel Patrick Moynihan, the United States ambassador to the United Nations, warned that, "The United Nations is about to make anti-Semitism international law." He delivered a speech against the resolution, including the famous line, "[The United States] does not acknowledge, it will not abide by, it will never acquiesce in this infamous act ... A great evil has been loosed upon the world." American president Gerald Ford condemned the resolution as "deplorable" and "wholly unjustified," saying that it "undermines the principles on which the UN is based."

In Campbell, California, in the United States, a group of high school students attempted to solicit signatures on the premises of a local shopping center for a petition against Resolution 3379. The result was the landmark U.S. Supreme Court decision in Pruneyard Shopping Center v. Robins (1980) that supported states' rights to expand the exercise of free speech, which California held was legal in what were considered public areas of a shopping mall.

Over 100,000 people attended a demonstration in New York City organised by the Conference of Presidents of Major American Jewish Organizations protesting the resolution. Speakers at the demonstration included civil rights activists Bayard Rustin and Percy Sutton, feminist Betty Friedan, Bishop of New York Paul Moore Jr., senator Jacob Javits, former Hadassah leader Faye Schenk, and Leah Rabin. The United Farm Workers also issued a statement condemning the resolution, noting that it would "encourage the latent anti-Semitism that has been a blot on world history and which continues to stain the conscience of mankind."

=== Europe ===
The resolution was widely condemned by western European governments and civil society. Dutch Minister of Foreign Affairs Max van der Stoel described the resolution as "a danger for the United Nations itself." French newspaper Le Monde published a front-page editorial decrying the resolution, saying that "morally, it is shocking that the people who has suffered most as a consequence of racism should be charged with this offense." An open letter condemning the resolution as "a forgery of historical truth" was signed by a wide range of prominent French scientists, philosophers, and politicians, including Jean-Paul Sartre, Pierre Mendès France, Simone de Beauvoir, François Mitterrand, René Cassin, François Jacob, Alfred Kastler, André Michel Lwoff, as well as by Soviet physicist Andrei Sakharov.

Both Soviet state broadcaster TASS and East German state broadcaster Allgemeiner Deutscher Nachrichtendienst issued statements in support of the resolution.

=== Other ===
The Canadian House of Commons voted unanimously to condemn the resolution.

Mexico's vote in favor of the resolution led some United States Jews to organize a tourism boycott of Mexico. This ended after Mexican foreign minister Emilio Óscar Rabasa made a trip to Israel (Rabasa shortly afterward was forced to resign).

== Revocation ==
UN General Assembly Resolution 46/86
- Date: 16 December 1991
- Meeting no.: 74
- Code: A/RES/46/86 (Document)
- Subject: Elimination of racism and racial discrimination
- Voting summary: 111 voted for; 25 voted against; 13 abstained
- Result: Adopted

United Nations General Assembly Resolution 46/86, adopted on 16 December 1991, revoked Resolution 3379's designation of Zionism as a form of racism and racial discrimination. Israel had made the revocation a condition for its participation in the Madrid Conference of 1991. The vote on Resolution 46/86 was held shortly after the Gulf War with sponsorship by 88 countries, including the overwhelming majority of both the First World and the Second World, and was chiefly supported by many African countries. The Arab League, most Muslim-majority countries, and four other countries (Cuba, North Korea, Sri Lanka, and Vietnam) voted against it.

In total, the motion to revoke Resolution 3379 received 111 votes in favour, 25 votes against, and 13 abstentions.

=== Motion by the United States ===
Resolution 46/86 was raised under pressure from the United States, and American president George H. W. Bush personally introduced the motion to revoke Resolution 3379 with the following statement:

UNGA Resolution 3379, the so-called "Zionism is racism" resolution, mocks this pledge and the principles upon which the United Nations was founded. And I call now for its repeal. Zionism is not a policy; it is the idea that led to the creation of a home for the Jewish people, to the State of Israel. And to equate Zionism with the intolerable sin of racism is to twist history and forget the terrible plight of Jews in World War II and, indeed, throughout history. To equate Zionism with racism is to reject Israel itself, a member of good standing of the United Nations. This body cannot claim to seek peace and at the same time challenge Israel's right to exist. By repealing this resolution unconditionally, the United Nations will enhance its credibility and serve the cause of peace.

=== Text of Resolution 46/86 ===
The full text of the revocation was simply:

"The General Assembly decides to revoke the determination contained in its resolution 3379 (XXX) of 10 November 1975."

=== Votes of Resolution 46/86 ===
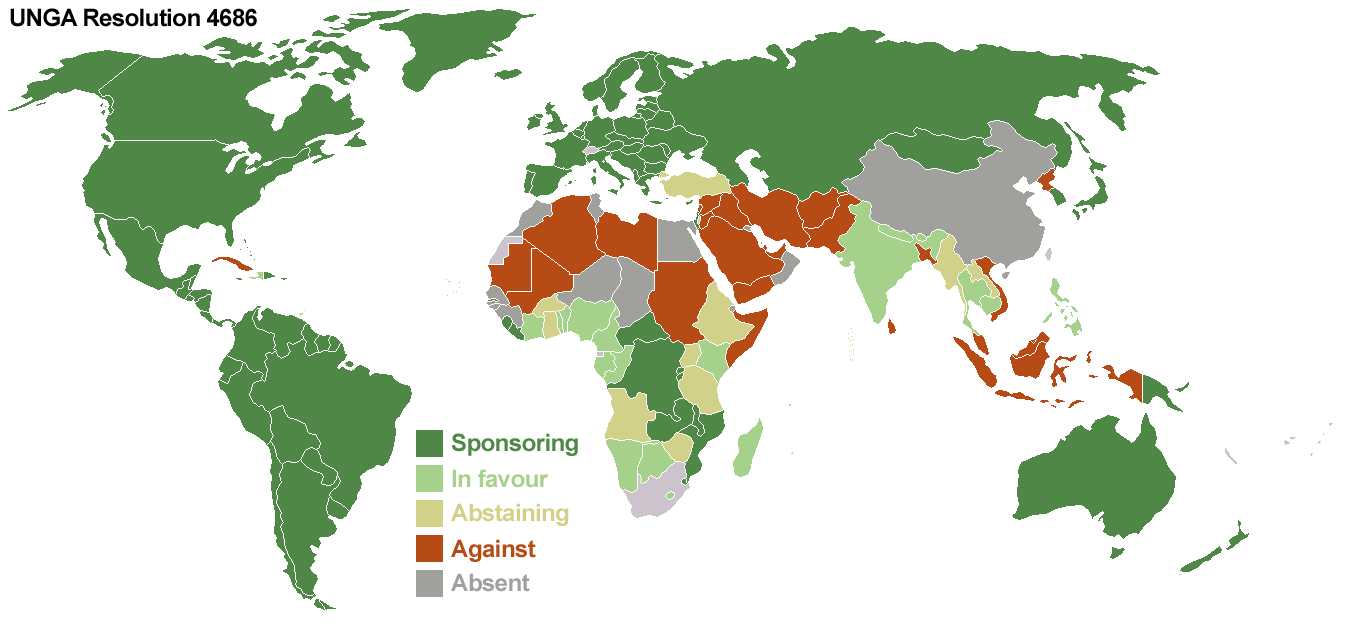
Voting record

| In favour (111) 88 states sponsoring | Abstaining (13) | Against (25) | Absent (15) |
|---|---|---|---|
| Albania; Antigua and Barbuda; Argentina; Australia; Austria; Bahamas; Barbados; Belarus; Belgium; Belize; Benin; Bhutan; Bolivia; Botswana; Brazil; Bulgaria; Burundi; Cambodia; Cameroon; Canada; Cape Verde; Central African Republic; Chile; Congo; Costa Rica; Côte d’Ivoire; Cyprus; Czechoslovakia; Denmark; Dominica; Dominican Republic; Ecuador; El Salvador; Estonia; Fiji; Finland; France; Gabon; The Gambia; Germany; Greece; Grenada; Guatemala; Guyana; Haiti; Honduras; Hungary; Iceland; India; Ireland; Israel; Italy; Jamaica; Japan; Kenya; Lesotho / Latvia; Liberia; Lithuania; Luxembourg; Madagascar; Malta; Malawi; Marshall Islands; Mexico; Mongolia; Micronesia; Mozambique; Namibia; Nepal; Netherlands; New Zealand; Nicaragua; Nigeria; Norway; Panama; Papua New Guinea; Paraguay; Peru; Philippines; Poland; Portugal; South Korea; Romania; Rwanda; Saint Kitts and Nevis; Saint Lucia; Saint Vincent and the Grenadines; São Tomé and Príncipe; Seychelles; Sierra Leone; Singapore; Solomon Islands; Soviet Union; Spain; Suriname; Swaziland; Sweden; Thailand; Togo; Ukraine; United Kingdom; United States; Uruguay; Venezuela; Yugoslavia; Zaire; Zambia | Angola; Burkina Faso; Ethiopia; Ghana; Laos; Maldives; Mauritius; Myanmar; Trinidad and Tobago; Turkey; Uganda; Tanzania; Zimbabwe | Afghanistan; Algeria; Brunei; Bangladesh; Cuba; North Korea; Indonesia; Iran; Iraq; Jordan; Lebanon; Libya; Malaysia; Mali; Mauritania; Pakistan; Qatar; Saudi Arabia; Somalia; Sri Lanka; Sudan; Syrian Arab Republic; United Arab Emirates; Vietnam; Yemen | Bahrain; Chad; China; Comoros; Djibouti; Egypt; Guinea; Guinea-Bissau; Kuwait; Morocco; Niger; Oman; Senegal; South Africa; Tunisia; Vanuatu |
Source: United Nations Bibliographic Information System

== Legacy ==
On 21 June 2004, while inaugurating the first United Nations conference on the issue of antisemitism, the Secretary-General of the United Nations Kofi Annan stated that "the actions of the United Nations on the issue of antisemitism have not always been worthy of its ideals. It is deplorable that the General Assembly adopted in 1975 a resolution which assimilated Zionism with racism and I welcome that it later came back on its position".

== See also ==
- Arab–Israeli conflict
  - Anti-Zionism
  - Israeli apartheid
  - Comparisons between Israel and Nazi Germany
- Lawfare
