= United Nations Decade for Women =

Un international initiative 1976 to 1985

The United Nations Decade for Women was a period from 1976 to 1985 focused on the policies and issues that impact women, such as pay equity, gendered violence, land holding, and other human rights. It was adopted December 15, 1975, by the United Nations General Assembly by Resolution 31/136 at the end of the International Women's Year.

The Decade formally consisted of three international meetings and conferences in Mexico City for "consciousness raising", Copenhagen for creating "networks", and Nairobi for "the solidarity of women world-wide" along with several regional meetings with specific UN agencies (UNESCO, WHO, ECLA, EEC) and nongovernmental organizations (YWCA, World Council of Churches, National Association of Women).

== History ==
The first UN Women's Conference was held in Mexico City in 1975. There it was declared that the UN Decade for Women would begin in 1976, due particularly to the efforts of Letitia Shahani and U Thant. Members of the UN, aimed to increase literacy, vocational training, education, and employment opportunities for women. They also planned to improve health education and services, family planning education, and welfare services for women.

=== Texts ===
The Conference's Declaration, formally titled the Declaration of Mexico on the Equality of Women and Their Contribution to Development and Peace, was made to promote the wellbeing of women of all socioeconomic statuses, though there was a particular focus on the protections and outreach to colonized countries. It called for an institution of a New International Economic Order. The Declaration made 30 principles that called for specific measures and areas to focus on for the development of women's rights. Many of these focus on the care for children and family life, access to education and communication, economic independence, rights to political engagement, choice in marriage, sexual autonomy and right to not be assaulted, and more. The inclusion of provisions for the elimination of Zionism was very controversial.

In December 1975, the UN's General Assembly committed to the Plan of Action and Declaration. With this, they established a United Nations Voluntary Fund for the Decade on Women (UNIFEM) and the UN International Research and Training Institute for the Advancement of Women.

In 1979, the UN General Assembly adopted the Convention on the Elimination of All Forms of Discrimination against Women.

== UN Women's Conferences ==
=== Copenhagen, Denmark, 1980 ===
This conference was used to reflect on progress made since the 1975 conference in Mexico.

As the organization began to reflect upon the progress that had been made so far, some issues that prevented the advancement of women were noted, including:

- Lack of sufficient involvement of men in improving women's role in society;
- Insufficient political will;
- Lack of recognition of the value of women's contributions to society;
- Lack of attention to the particular needs of women in planning;
- A shortage of women in decision-making positions;
- Insufficient services to support the role of women in national life, such as co-operatives, day-care centres and credit facilities;
- Overall lack of necessary financial resources;
- Lack of awareness among women about the opportunities available to them.

Controversially, delegates from a variety of colonized countries elaborated on subjects regarding the domination of the countries they represented by countries such as the United States and the United Kingdom. They condemned the international actions and rulings in favour of colonialism, racism, apartheid, hegemonism, and Zionism. When the representatives demanded an elaboration on the texts regarding the opposition and protect of women from the effects of these issues, dozens of the governments of world powers opposed and abstained.

In response, a "Programme of Action" was produced to promote women's ownership and control of property and inheritance, child custody, and loss of nationality. In addition, delegates at the Conference spoke out against stereotyped attitudes towards women. It was adopted with a vote of 94 to 4. The four countries opposed were Australia, Canada, Israel, and the United States. The US and Canada criticized the Plan, saying that it went beyond the scope of issues they considered to be pertinent to women, as there was a focus on political disputes. It has since been determined by the UN that countries in conflict are especially harmful to women in the regions.

In the end, the conference adopted 45 resolutions on matters on the role of women in development, health, education, employment, and more. The Holy See, of the Catholic Church, was opposed to the texts that included family planning as a human right.

=== Nairobi, Kenya, 1985 ===
This conference was gathered to celebrate the accomplishments of the decade, but also to establish an agenda that would continue the efforts of the issues facing women beyond 1985. A document titled "The Nairobi Forward-Looking Strategies for the Advancement of Women" was created. In 1995, a conference was held in Beijing, China. to accelerate the implementation of the initiatives outlined in the document.

In drafting the Forward Looking Strategies document, representatives and supporters of Palestine wanted to add Zionism as a form of oppression to be condemned alongside of neo-colonialism, the arms race, and more. After a three-hour diplomatic lobbying, all parties decided to use the broader terms of "racism and racial discrimination".

At the event, over 160 groups attended the forum of Non-Governmental Organizations and sponsored over 2000 workshops. Women headed 106 of the 160 delegations from as many countries. More than 4000 women came to Kenya during the 2.5 weeks of meetings.

Because of this conference, the UN made the UNIFEM an autonomous organization with the UN Development Programme.

== Legacy ==
The focus on women during the decade brought about a lot of changes in policies impacting women.

A year after the conference in Nairobi, the UN published the first World Survey on the Role of Women in Development. To do the reporting every year, governments had to establish "women's departments", appoint cabinet ministers for women's affairs, and begin considering the roles and statuses of women in their countries. Prior to these appointments and specific studies, women often went "invisible" in global economic reports, as their labour is typically unpaid.

Many UN programmes and funds were created in the duration of the decade that have remained active such as the United Nations Development Fund for Women, the Convention on the Elimination of All Forms of Discrimination Against Women (which 170 countries ratified by 1985), the Commission on the Status of Women, and the United Nations International Research and Training Institute for the Advancement of Women.

The UN's Economic Commission for Africa appointed a women's officer to study the effects of development policies on women.

== See also ==
- International Women's Year
- United Nations Decade on Biodiversity
- United Nations Literacy Decade
