= United Nations Commission on Conventional Armaments =

United Nations 1947 commission

The United Nations Commission on Conventional Armaments was founded as a result of the founding United Nations treaty in 1946. The goal of the commission was to find ways to reduce the size of non-nuclear armaments around the world. The Commission was formally established by the Security Council Resolution on 13 February 1947. The five permanent members of the United Nation Security Council could not agree on how to achieve this aim and so the first report of the Commission in 1949 made no substantial recommendations.

In 1950, the Soviet Union refused to sit with the representatives of the "Kuomintang group" (i.e. the representatives of Chiang Kai-shek's Republic of China) on the Commission. This brought an effective end to the Commission's discussion. It was formally dissolved in 1952.

== Links ==
- Resolution 300 of the Fourth Session of the United Nations
- United Nations archive records on the Commission
- Report from the Disarmament Times

== See also ==
- Convention on Certain Conventional Weapons
- United Nations General Assembly Resolution 192
- United Nations Security Council Resolution 77
- United Nations Disarmament Commission
