= United Nations General Assembly Resolution 3010 (XXVII) =

Resolution adopted by the UN General Assembly

UN General Assembly Resolution 3010
- Date: 18 December 1972
- Meeting no.: 2113
- Code: A/RES/27/3010 (XXVII) (Document)
- Subject: Proclaiming 1975 International Women's Year.
- Result: Approved

United Nations General Assembly Resolution 3010 (XXVII) was a resolution adopted by the UN General Assembly on 18 December 1972, proclaiming 1975 as International Women's Year.

== Text ==
The General Assembly,

Considering that twenty-five years have elapsed since the first session of the Commission on the Status of Women was held at Lake Success, New York, from 10 to 24 February 1947, and that this is a period which makes it possible to take stock of the positive results obtained,

Bearing in mind the aims and principles of the Declaration on the Elimination of Discrimination against Women, adopted by the General Assembly in resolution 2263 (XXII) of 7 November 1967,

Recognizing the effectiveness of the work done by the Commission on the Status of Women in the twenty-five years since its establishment, and the important contribution which women have made to the social, political, economic and cultural life of their countries,

Considering that it is necessary to strengthen universal recognition of the principle of the equality of men and women, de jure and de facto, and that both legal and social measures have to be taken by Member States which have not yet done so to ensure the implementation of women's rights,

Recalling that its resolution 2626 (XXV) of 24 October 1970, containing the International Development Strategy for the Second United Nations Development Decade, includes among the goals and objectives of the Decade the encouragement of the full integration of women in the total development effort,

Drawing attention to the general objectives and minimum targets to be attained in the course of the Second United Nations Development Decade, as defined by the Commission on the Status of Women and adopted by the General Assembly in its resolution 2716 (XXV) of 15 December 1970,

Considering that, with those ends in view, the proclamation of an international women's year would serve to intensify the action required to advance the status of women,

1. Proclaims the year 1975 International Women's Year;

2. Decides to devote this year to intensified action:

(a) To promote equality between men and women;
(b) To ensure the full integration of women in the total development effort, especially by emphasizing women's responsibility and important role in economic, social and cultural development at the national, regional and international levels, particularly during the Second United Nations Development Decade;
(c) To recognize the importance of women's increasing contribution to the development of friendly relations and co-operation among States and to the strengthening of world peace;

3. Invites all Member States and all interested organizations to take steps to ensure the full realization of the rights of women and their advancement on the basis of the Declaration on the Elimination of Discrimination against Women;

4. Invites Governments that have not yet done so to ratify as soon as possible the Convention concerning Equal Remuneration for Men and Women Workers for Work of Equal Value, 1951,/22 adopted by the International Labour Conference at its thirty-fourth session;

5. Requests the Secretary-General to prepare, in consultation with Member States, specialized agencies and interested non-governmental organizations, within the limits of existing resources, a draft programme for the International Women's Year and to submit it to the Commission on the Status of Women at its twenty-fifth session in 1974.
