= International Women's Year =

Name given to 1975 by the United Nations

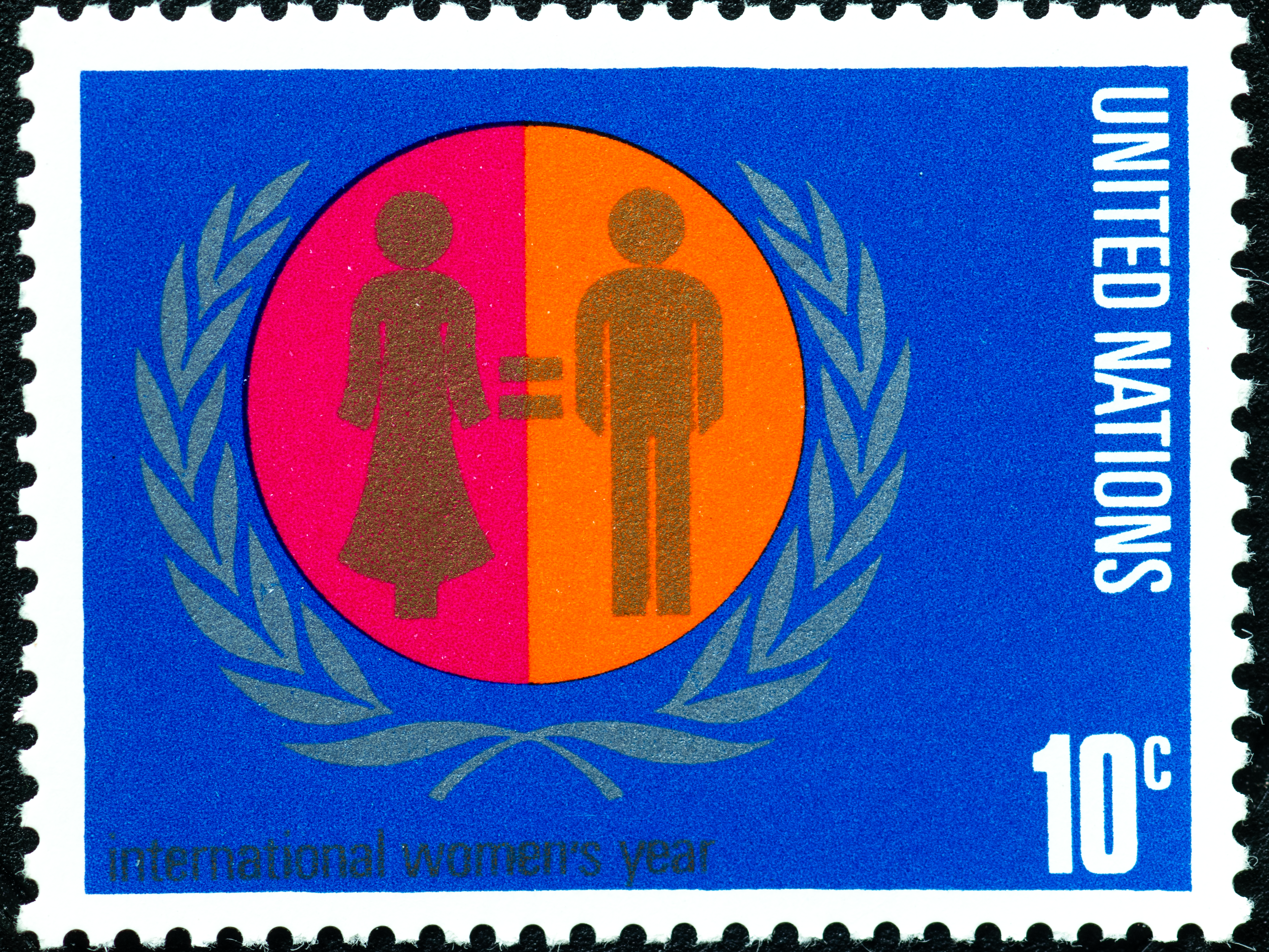
1975 United Nations stamp commemorating the International Women's Year

International Women's Year (IWY) was the name given to 1975 by the United Nations. Since that year March 8 has been celebrated as International Women's Day, and the United Nations Decade for Women, from 1976 to 1985, was also established.

== History ==
It began in New York City on March 8, 1857, when female textile workers marched in protest of unfair working conditions and unequal rights for women. It was one of the first organized strikes by working women, during which they called for a shorter work day and decent wages. After years of work by the United Nations Commission on the Status of Women (CSW) to adopt a declaration to eliminate discrimination against women, in 1965, CSW began working in earnest to obtain passage of a declaration to secure women's human rights. Collating responses covering education, employment, inheritance, penal reform, and other issues, from government actors, NGO representatives and UN staff, CSW delegates drafted the Declaration on the Elimination of Discrimination Against Women (DEDAW), which was passed by the General Assembly on 7 November 1967. Once support had been garnered for the declaration, the next step was to prepare it to become a Convention. Though there were delays, by 1972, when the United States Congress passed Title IX, eliminating discrimination in education for any institution receiving federal funding, hope that passage could be secured surged.

In the meantime, members of the Women's International Democratic Federation (WIDF) had long been pressing for an international women's year and conference to address women's inequality. As WIDF was designated as an observer and not a member of the CSW, they could not propose the event directly but drafted a proposal. Persuading the Romanian delegate of CSW to present their proposal, it was seconded by Finland. In turn, CSW approved the proposal and submitted it to the General Assembly, which proclaimed 1975 as International Women's Year on 18 December 1972. The date was significant because it would take place on the thirtieth anniversary of the creation of the United Nations.

There were challenges, however, in organizing the conference. Initially, Soviet women rejected the call for a conference and filibustered the negotiations, preferring to host their own conference in East Berlin that would not be subject to the UN structure. As part of the Cold War politics, the United States then proposed that the conference not be limited to women, but should be gender-neutral, because an all-woman conference would not be taken seriously. Finally, Mexico City agreed to host the conference, and CSW set about the tasks to prepare the "machinery" necessary to secure passage of DEDAW. Helvi Sipilä, was selected as the Assistant Secretary-General for Social Development and Humanitarian Affairs and placed in charge of organizing events for the year.

== International ==
=== Mexico City ===
The first UN World Conference on Women was held in Mexico City from 19 June to 2 July. It was attended by over a thousand delegates. Prominent attendees included Elizabeth Reid and Margaret Whitlam of Australia. The International Women's Year Tribune was also organized by the conference committee and attended by 4,000 women in 1975.

The 1975 conference led to the adoption of the World Plan of Action, as well as the Declaration of Mexico on the Equality of Women and Their Contribution to Development and Peace. It led to the establishment of monitoring mechanisms such as, International Research and Training Institute for the Advancement of Women (INSTRAW) and the United Nations Development Fund for Women (UNIFEM) and set in motion plans for follow-up conferences, the first of which would be held in 1980 in Copenhagen.

The conference also established the period of 1975 to 1985 as the UN Decade for Women, to enable progress and failures to be evaluated and resulted in urging that the Convention on the Elimination of All Forms of Discrimination against Women (CEDAW) be quickly ratified. The 1985 third conference in Nairobi, Kenya, not only closed the decade of women but set a series of member state schedules for removal of legislated gender discrimination in national laws by the year 2000.

=== East Berlin ===
The World Congress of Women was held in East Berlin as a part of IWY soon after the Mexico City event. It idealized women's equality as the "true embodiment of the socialist conception of human rights". The Working Group on Equal Rights, composed of experts on government and law from the East German Academy of Sciences, Humboldt University and Socialist United Party Central Committee rejected the notion that women's rights should fall under a separate area designated by gender, but instead should be governed by the United Nations Human Right's position. Angela Davis was one of the key guests at the conference, as was Hortensia Bussi de Allende, former First Lady of Chile. The state-sponsored program advocated women's solidarity in the national struggles to free women from oppression based on class, race and gender through state socialism.

=== Brussels ===
The International Tribunal on the Crimes Against Women was planned as an event for IWY but was not held until 4 to 8 March 1976 in Brussels, Belgium. Limited by funding strictures, the conference hosted 2000 women from forty countries. Speakers addressed economic exploitation and violence against women in its many forms. The most significant development to come out of the conference was the International Feminist Network.

== Zionism controversy ==
The 1975 conference was also notable for passing the first "Zionism is racism" resolution passed at any UN-sponsored forum, thus preparing the way for United Nations General Assembly Resolution 3379 in 1975 the following November.

A statement equating Zionism with racism was also included in an annex to a report to be considered at the final conference of the United Nations Decade for Women in 1985 in Nairobi, Kenya. However, as stated in It Takes a Dream: The Story of Hadassah (1997), by Marlin Levin, "Bernice [Tannenbaum] asked [President Ronald] Reagan to publicly repudiate the U.N. resolution. He agreed and promised that the U.S. delegation would walk out of Nairobi if the Zionism-equals-racism resolution was included in the final conference declaration." Tannenbaum also convinced the United States Senate to condemn the conference resolution and demand its withdrawal. She also personally flew to Kenya with a draft of the Senate resolution, where Maureen Reagan, President Reagan's daughter and the head of the American delegation, repeated the president's promise to withdraw from the conference if the resolution was included in the final conference delegation. Kenya then brokered a compromise in which Zionism was omitted from the final conference report.

== National ==
=== Australia ===
A conference on 'Women and Politics' was held in September, attended by 700 women.

=== Canada ===
The events of IWY in Canada as a whole raised awareness with Canadian women as well as the general public on a wide range of women's issues and accomplishments. It spurred the creation of the Ontario Women and the Law Association and the Service, Office and Retail Workers’ Union of Canada (SORWUC) and offered funding for many to participate in educational and artistic endeavors aimed at presenting women's perspectives. One such effort was a petition to the National Film Board of Canada which led to the creation of Studio D. The University of Guelph hosted a conference in September dedicated to Nellie McClung and the reform issues which had been important to her.

=== New Zealand ===
In June a United Women's Convention was held in Wellington.

=== United States ===
Events in support of IWY were held throughout the United States by private organizations and NGOs, such as those held in Connecticut, 11–12 June 1977 and the Greater Cleveland Congress, October. One of the most significant US events, because it was funded by the US government, was held in Houston, Texas and though planned as an IWY event, did not take place until 1977. The 1977 National Women's Conference included women from each state in the United States and developed a National Plan of Action, mirroring many of the points of the World Plan of Action.

=== India ===
The then Indian Prime Minister Indira Gandhi had inaugurated National Women's Day and International Women's Year event jointly sponsored by 50 women's organizations at NDMC Indoor Stadium New Delhi in India on Basant Panchami Sunday February 16, 1975.

=== Sri Lanka ===
In recognition of IWY in 1975, the then Sri Lankan Prime Minister Sirimavo Bandaranaike created an agency to focus on women’s issues, which would later become the Ministry of Women and Child Affairs. She also appointed Siva Obeyesekere as State Secretary for Health and later as Minister of Health. Bandaranaike subsequently attended the United Nations World Conference on Women in Mexico City, where she was the only woman prime minister elected in her own right.

== Outcomes ==
As a result of the international focus on Women in 1975, a number of institutions were established:

- International Research and Training Institute for the Advancement of Women (INSTRAW)
- United Nations Development Fund for Women (UNIFEM)
- Women's Studies Resource Centre was established in South Australia during July.

== Emblem ==
The IWY also launched the "dove" emblem used by the IWY, CEDAW, and UNIFIL. A stylized dove intersected by a female symbol and an equal sign, the emblem was donated by then 27-year-old New York City advertising company graphic designer Valerie Pettis. It remains the official symbol of UN Women and is used in International Women's Day celebrations to this day.

== See also ==
- National Women's Conference
- Gender Equality Architecture Reform
- NGO CSW/NY
- United Nations Security Council Resolution 1325
- United Nations International Research and Training Institute for the Advancement of Women
- Women's rights
- Declaration on the Elimination of Discrimination against Women
- Declaration on the Elimination of Violence Against Women
- EGM: prevention of violence against women and girls
- Global Implementation Plan to End Violence against Women and Girls
- Convention on preventing and combating violence against women and domestic violence
