= Mothers of Srebrenica =

Lobbying group based in the Netherlands

- Formation: 2002; 24 years ago
- Founder: Hatidža Mehmedović
- Type: NGO
- Legal status: Active
- Purpose: Protection of human rights Focus on justice for victims of the Srebrenica massacre
- Location: Bosnia and Herzegovina
- Website: Official site

The Mothers of Srebrenica (Serbo-Croatian: Majke Srebrenice / Мајке Сребренице), also known as the Mothers of the Enclaves of Srebrenica and Žepa (Serbo-Croatian: Majke enklave Srebrenica i Žepa / Мајке енклаве Сребреница и Жепа), is an activist and lobbying group based in the Netherlands that represents 6,000 survivors of the siege of Srebrenica during the Yugoslav Wars of the 1990s. The organization is best known for bringing a civil action against the United Nations for a breach of duty of care for the failure to prevent the genocide at Srebrenica.

The Mothers of Srebrenica was founded in 2002 by Hatidža Mehmedović to advocate for justice for victims of the Srebrenica massacre and collect donations for their surviving family members. Mehmedović, a homemaker turned human rights activist who lost her husband and both sons in the massacre, had returned to Srebrenica, also in 2002, becoming one of the first Bosniaks to move back to the region after the war. She served as President of the Mothers of Srebrenica until her death in 2018.

== Court case ==
The Mothers of Srebrenica bought proceedings in a Dutch local court regarding the Srebrenica massacre citing that a Dutch battalion under United Nations oversight was responsible for the safe haven at Srebrenica in 2007, that both the United Nations and Netherlands breached that duty of care, and they were negligent.

The Netherlands court held that under Article 105 of the United Nations Charter the United Nations had immunity in this instance. The district court held that they did not have jurisdiction to even hear the case. The matter was appealed to a higher court in 2012 where it was argued by the Mothers of Srebrenica that the United Nations immunity denied the party the right to a trial, which is guaranteed in the European Convention on Human Rights.

The appellant court held the United Nations Charter had primacy over domestic laws, based on Article 103 of the UN charter, and it remained absolute even in the face of claims of violation of jus cogens. The Court held that even jus cogens does not overrule the absolute immunity of the United Nations.

The court found that "pursuant to the judgment of the International Court of Justice in Nicaragua v. United States in which the ICJ interpreted Article 103 of the UN Charter to mean that the Charter obligations of UN Member States prevail over conflicting obligations from another international treaty, whether earlier or later in time than the Charter, the Supreme Court of the Netherlands came to the conclusion that the UN enjoys absolute immunity." Therefore any right of access to courts contained in Article 6 of the European Convention on Human Rights and Article 14 in International Covenant on Civil and Political Rights did not prevail over the immunity of the United Nations even given the gravity of the alleged charges.

In 2014 the Mothers filed a separate claim against the Dutch government using a series of different terms, and the Dutch court found the Netherlands liable for only 300 of the 10000 deaths. The legal basis that differentiated the two was that in the second trial the court looked at the issue of effective control: command shifted at the point where the safe haven was overrun; at that point, effective control shifted from the United Nations to the Dutch government due to the loss of command structures. The Dutch government was found to be responsible for safety of the safe haven for that short time.

This second case upheld the United Nations' immunity. The precedent of this case is that participating state under a United Nations flag may be liable where the UN immunity is enforced.

In 2019 the Supreme Court of the Netherlands ruled that the Dutch forces were 10% liable for the massacre given the 10% probability that they could have prevented it. The Dutch compound held 350 Muslims who were unknown to Serbian forces but were still evicted from the compound on Serbian demands; the court ruled the Dutch forces directly responsible for their deaths. Mothers of Srebrenica were in attendance but were not provided with translators, and they had to be informed about the ruling afterwards.
