= Amendments to the United Nations Charter =

Procedure set out in the UN Charter

Amendments to the United Nations Charter can be made by a procedure set out in Chapter XVIII of the UN Charter. The UN Charter has been amended five times since 1945.

== Amendment process ==
Article 108 provides:

Amendments to the present Charter shall come into force for all Members of the United Nations when they have been adopted by a vote of two thirds of the members of the General Assembly and ratified in accordance with their respective constitutional processes by two thirds of the Members of the United Nations, including all the permanent members of the Security Council.

Because Charter amendments require the consent of all five permanent members of the UN Security Council—defined in Article 23 of the Charter as "The Republic of China, France, the Union of Soviet Socialist Republics, the United Kingdom of Great Britain and Northern Ireland, and the United States of America"—it is impossible for other UN member states to force the permanent five to give up their Security Council 'veto power', by means of a Charter amendment. Many reformers have described this situation as a Catch-22. According to Global Policy Forum, "the P-5 are content with the present arrangements and oppose any changes that might dilute or challenge their power or expand their 'club.' China has already announced it will block permanent membership for Japan, and the United States has suggested that it will only support Council reform that commands an implausibly 'broad consensus'".

Article 109 provides for the convening of a "General Conference of the Members of the United Nations" to consider amendments. In 1955, the UN General Assembly established a committee to meet and report on this possibility annually. The committee did so until 1967. The requirement that a "proposal to call such a conference shall be placed on the agenda" of the 1955 General Assembly reflects the intent of the UN Charter's framers that the original charter would only be a provisional document, until the establishment of a more perfect union within a decade or two. Many organizations have launched lobbying efforts and petition drives in an attempt to invoke the provisions of Article 109.

According to the Commission on Global Governance's 1995 report Our Global Neighborhood, "Article 109 of the UN Charter envisaged Charter revision. A mandatory revision was one idea canvassed at San Francisco, in the context of the objections to the provision for a veto by countries that were not great powers".

== Amendments ==
The changes to the UN Charter, made by means of four amendments, were:

- 31 August 1965: Expansion of the UN Security Council from 11 to 15 members, with the supermajority required for action being increased from 7 to 9 votes (Articles 23 and 27). Adopted 17 December 1963 and ratified (became operative) 31 August 1965.
- 31 August 1965: Expansion of UN Economic and Social Council from 18 to 27 members (Article 61). Adopted 17 December 1963 and ratified 31 August 1965.
- 12 June 1968: Article 109 was amended to reflect the increase in Security Council membership. Adopted 20 December 1965 and ratified 12 June 1968.
- 24 September 1973: Expansion of the UN Economic and Social Council from 27 to 54 members (Article 61). Adopted 20 December 1971 and ratified 24 September 1973.

These amendments were adjustments to take into account increases in the UN membership, which has almost quadrupled since 1945.

== Structural changes adopted without amendment ==
Major changes to the Charter-defined structure of the UN have also been made without formal amendment of the text:

- The requirement in Article 27 that "Decisions of the Security Council on all other matters [not procedural] shall be made by an affirmative vote of nine members including the concurring votes of the permanent members..." has been reinterpreted in practice to include abstentions within the definition of 'concurring votes'.
- The Soviet Union's permanent seat in the UN Security Council was assumed by Russia. See Russia's membership in the United Nations.
- The Taipei-based Republic of China's permanent seat in the Security Council was assumed by the Beijing-based People's Republic of China when the General Assembly adopted Resolution 2758. See China and the United Nations
