= Chapter XII of the United Nations Charter =

Chapter dealing with international trusteeship of territories moving towards independence

Chapter XII of the United Nations Charter deals with the international trusteeship system. It reaffirms the twin goals mentioned in Chapter XI to "promote the political, economic, social, and educational advancement of the inhabitants of the trust territories, and their progressive development towards self-government or independence". It also provides that the trusteeship system applies to:

- territories now held under mandate;
- territories which may be detached from enemy states as a result of the Second World War; and
- territories voluntarily placed under the system by states responsible for their administration.

Application is not automatic, but the trusteeship system is not imposed by the Charter on any territories. Its application is left to subsequent agreements between the states directly concerned. Although there are no territories administered under this system today, a country could theoretically place one of its territories under the trusteeship system. Articles 82-85 make reference to "strategic areas" of territories.

The trusteeship system shall not apply to territories which have become members of the United Nations, only among those of sovereign equality.

Article 79 of Chapter XII has been criticized for its ambiguous language.
