= Hatidža Mehmedović =

Bosnian human rights activist (1952–2018)

President of the Mothers of Srebrenica
- In office 2002–2018
- Preceded by: office established
- Succeeded by: Fazila Efendić

Personal details
- Born: Hatidža Bektić; 1 March 1952 Bektići near Sućeska, PR Bosnia and Herzegovina, FPR Yugoslavia
- Died: 22 July 2018 (aged 66) Sarajevo, Bosnia and Herzegovina
- Spouse: Abdulah Mehmedović (died 1995)
- Children: 2

Hatidža Mehmedović (née Bektić; 1 March 1952 – 22 July 2018) was a Bosnian human rights activist, survivor of the Srebrenica genocide, and founder of the Mothers of Srebrenica, an association of women whose relatives were killed in the July 1995 genocide in Srebrenica. Following the genocide of more than 8,000 Muslim Bosniak men and boys, including her husband and two sons, Mehmedović became a vocal advocate for bringing the perpetrators of the Srebrenica genocide to justice.

== Biography ==
Hatidža Mehmedović was born as Hatidža Bektić in the hamlet of Bektići, near Sućeska in the Srebrenica Municipality. At the outbreak of the Bosnian War, she was a homemaker with a primary school education. She lived with her husband, Abdulah Mehmedović, and their sons, Azmir and Almir (who was nicknamed Lalo), in Vidikovac, just outside of Srebrenica in eastern Bosnia and Herzegovina.

=== Srebrenica massacre ===
By 1995, Serb forces had overrun much of eastern Bosnia and expelled the local Bosniak population in an ethnic cleansing campaign. Their objective was to annex Serb controlled areas to the neighboring Serbia. More than 40,000 people, mostly Bosniaks, took refuge in Srebrenica, one of the region's last enclaves outside Bosnian Serb control. However, the town was conquered by forces led by the Bosnian Serb General Ratko Mladić. Srebrenica's women were evacuated, but much of Srebrenica's male population would be killed by paramilitaries under Mladić's command.

Hatidža Mehmedović last saw her husband, Abdulah (aged 44), and sons, Azmir (aged 21) and Almir (aged 18), in the forested hills surrounding Srebrenica before their separation. She described her final parting with her family in a November 2017 interview with a Bosnian television station, "We were standing there and my young one, Lalo — that's what we called him, although his name was Almir — was saying, 'Go on, mother, go, leave, already' as he was pulling me closer and closer, and would not let me go... We thought we'd see each other in two, three days. We did not know they'd kill them all."

Mehmedović was bused to the relative safety to Kladanj, a town near Tuzla. Red Cross officials later informed Mehmedović that her husband and sons were missing. More than 8,000 Bosniak men and boys were killed in the massacre. Among the victims were Mehmedović's husband, sons, and her two brothers, Edhem and Hamed.

== Activism ==
The remains of her husband and sons were later recovered within the more than 100 mass graves uncovered in the region surrounding Srebrenica. Their bodies were positively identified. In 2010, Mehmedović had them reburied at the Srebrenica Genocide Memorial in the nearby village of Potočari.

Mehmedović lived in a suburb of Sarajevo from the late 1990s until 2002. In 2002, she moved back to her prewar home in Vidikovac, located just outside Srebrenica on the road to Potočari, despite memories of the war and massacre. Mehmedović, who was one of first Bosniaks to permanently return to the area following the Bosnian War, wanted to show that Bosniaks and Bosnian Serbs could still live side-by-side. She returned to a very different area. There was little electricity in 2002 and few paved roads in region. Her only neighbor at the time was an elderly Serb man, whom she helped with chores and shopping. She stressed that she did not blame Serbs or harbor collective guilt towards them. Instead, Mehmedović began to advocate for the arrest and convictions of individual perpetrators of the Srebrenica massacre.

In 2002, the same year she moved back to Srebrenica, Mehmedović founded Mothers of Srebrenica, an association of women and survivors whose relatives were killed in the Srebrenica massacre. The Mothers of Srebrenica advocated for justice for the victims and collected donations for survivors and their families. She also served as the leader and president of the organization.

Hatidža Mehmedović became a forceful advocate for justice for her family and the other victims of the Bosnian genocide. She addressed both Bosnian and international audiences, including journalists, school students, human rights activists, neighbors, and politicians. In an interview before her death, she reiterated her support for justice for the victims, "We can't let those who had killed to become the same as those who had been killed. I should not be the only one who is afraid of the future in which we don’t know who the perpetrator was and who the victim was."

Most recently, Mehmedović had vocally opposed to growing nationalism within Bosnia and Herzegovina. She publicly condemned politicians throughout the Balkans who denied the Srebrenica massacre or supported ethnic or sectarian division in region.

In November 2017, Mehmedović traveled to the Hague, where she was present in the courtroom for the sentencing of Ratko Mladić to life in prison for his role in the Srebrenica massacre. In an interview with Deutsche Welle (DW) following Mladić's guilty verdict and sentencing, Mehmedović's said: "A life sentence for Mladić is just a drop in the ocean." As president of the Mothers of Srebrenica, she pointed out that, even with the verdict, "We, the mothers, live only through the memories of our children." While Mladić was successfully prosecuted, she reminded observers shortly after the verdict that there were still perpetrators of other Bosnian wartime crimes against humanity at-large who needed to be brought to justice as well, telling DW, "We are sad that [Mladić] was sentenced only for Srebrenica and not also for genocide in other Bosnian communities. The butchers are being tried, but the entity created by these crimes still exists. Their rulers want to make it a state or to annex it to Serbia. We will never accept this."

Mehmedović's home near Srebrenica, which she reclaimed in 2002, became a memorial for victims of the massacre. She cared for three pine trees in her yard that her son Almir had planted before the Bosnian War. She also preserved a cement pathway leading to her house where Almir had written his name in freshly poured concrete by the front door.

== Death ==
Hatidža Mehmedović died from complications of breast cancer at a hospital in Sarajevo on 22 July 2018 at the age of 65. Her death was confirmed by Ćamil Duraković, her friend and former Mayor of Srebrenica, who called her a "tough, strong woman, an incredible leader in the largely patriarchal society in which women remain mostly in the background."

Hundreds of people attended her funeral in Srebrenica. She was buried in Sućeska.

Michael Brand, a German politician and member of the Bundestag who worked closely with Mehmedović, noted that she "fought like a lioness" on behalf of the massacre victims and their families, but "justice was her mission, not revenge." He called her "a thorn in the side of people who to this day try to sweep the most serious war crimes under the carpet and rewrite history" and reiterated that without Mehmedović many details and perpetrators of the attacks in Srebrenica would have never been uncovered.
