= Chapter 13 (disambiguation) =

Chapter 13, Title 11, United States Code is a component of United States bankruptcy laws.

Chapter Thirteen, Chapter 13, or Chapter XIII may also refer to:

== Music ==
- Chapter 13 (album), a Gorefest album

== Television ==
- "Chapter 13" (Eastbound & Down)
- "Chapter 13" (House of Cards)
- "Chapter 13" (Legion)
- "Chapter 13" (Star Wars: Clone Wars), an episode of Star Wars: Clone Wars
- "Chapter 13: The Jedi", an episode of The Mandalorian
- "Chapter Thirteen" (Boston Public)
- "Chapter Thirteen: Come Together", an episode of Katy Keene
- "Chapter Thirteen: The Passion of Sabrina Spellman", an episode of Chilling Adventures of Sabrina
- "Chapter Thirteen: The Sweet Hereafter", an episode of Riverdale

== Other uses ==
- Chapter XIII of the United Nations Charter
