= Chapter Nine =

Chapter Nine refers to a ninth chapter in a book.

Chapter Nine, Chapter 9, or Chapter IX may also refer to:

== Television ==
- "Chapter 9" (American Horror Story)
- "Chapter 9" (Eastbound & Down)
- "Chapter 9" (House of Cards)
- "Chapter 9" (Legion)
- "Chapter 9" (Star Wars: Clone Wars), an episode of Star Wars: Clone Wars
- "Chapter 9: The Marshal", an episode of The Mandalorian
- "Chapter Nine" (Boston Public)
- "Chapter Nine: La Grande Illusion", an episode of Riverdale
- "Chapter Nine: The Returned Man", an episode of Chilling Adventures of Sabrina
- "Chapter Nine: Wishin' & a Hopin'", an episode of Katy Keene
- Episodes of Stranger Things:
  - "Chapter Nine: The Gate", season 2
  - "Chapter Nine: The Piggyback", season 4

== Other uses ==
- Chapter 9, Title 11, United States Code, chapter of the United States Bankruptcy Code
- Chapter nine institutions, group of organisations
- Chapter IX of the United Nations Charter
