= Chapter VIII of the United Nations Charter =

Division of the United Nations Charter

Chapter VIII of the United Nations Charter deals with regional arrangements. It authorizes regional organizations (such as the African Union and the North Atlantic Treaty Organization).

It even requires attempts to resolve disputes through such agencies (if available) prior to intervention by the UN Security Council. However, Article 53 provides that "no enforcement action shall be taken under regional arrangements or by regional agencies without the authorization of the Security Council."

Chapter VIII makes reference to enemy states, which were powers such as Japan and Germany that remained enemies of the UN signatories at the time of the promulgation of the UN Charter (in the closing months of World War II in mid-1945). There have been proposals to remove these references, but none have come to fruition. Chapter VIII is analogous to Article 21 of the Covenant of the League of Nations, which provides, "Nothing in this Covenant shall be deemed to affect the validity of international engagements, such as treaties of arbitration or regional understandings like the Monroe Doctrine, for securing the maintenance of peace."
