= Salwa Judum =

Former anti-insurgency militia in India

- Leader: Mahendra Karma
- Dates active: 2005–2011
- Country: India
- Active regions: Bastar and Dantewada districts of Chhattisgarh
- Ideology: Anti-Naxalite; Anti-communism
- Status: Inactive
- Size: 4,000

Salwa Judum (meaning "peace march" in the Gondi language) was a militia that was mobilised and deployed as part of counterinsurgency operations in Chhattisgarh, India, aimed at countering Naxalite activities in the region. The militia, consisting of local tribal youth, received support and training from the Chhattisgarh state government. It was outlawed and banned by a Supreme Court court order but continues to exist in the form of armed auxiliary forces, District Reserve Groups, and other vigilante groups.

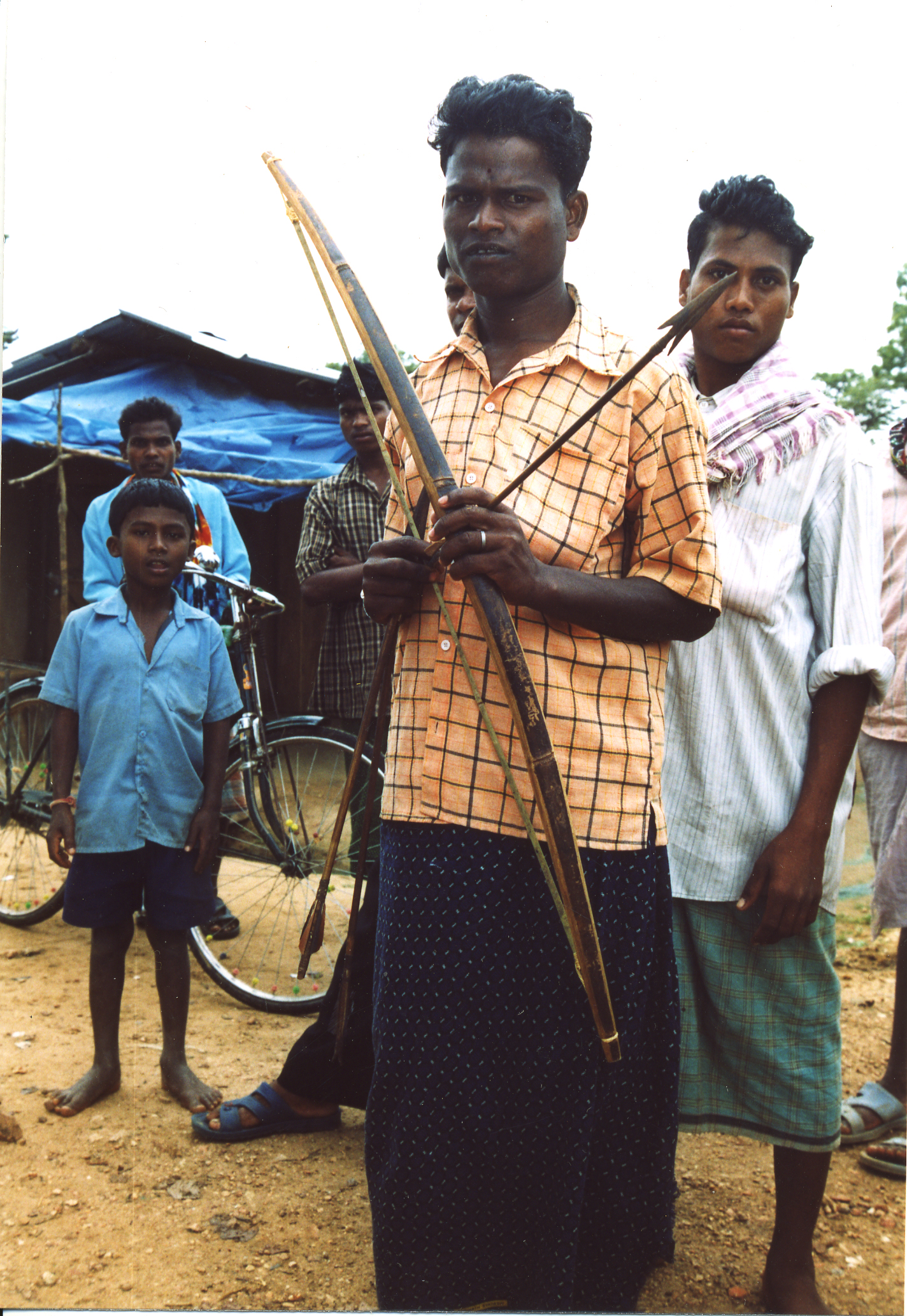
Tribal Salwa Judum volunteers in southern Chhattisgarh

On 5 July 2011, the Supreme Court of India, in a case filed by Nandini Sundar and others, declared the militia to be illegal and unconstitutional and ordered its disbanding. The court directed the Government of Chhattisgarh to recover all of its firearms, ammunition, and accessories. The use of Salwa Judum by the government for anti-Naxal operations was criticised for its violations of human rights and poorly trained youth acting in counter-insurgency roles. The court also ordered the government to investigate all instances of alleged criminal activities by Salwa Judum.

On 25 May 2013, the group's founder, Mahendra Karma, who had become a senior Congress party leader, was killed in a Naxalite attack, along with around two dozen party leaders and members, in Darbha Valley of Chhattisgarh, 400 km south of Raipur and 50 km from Jagdalpur.

== Origins ==
Salwa Judum was formed in 2005 as a state-sponsored vigilante movement against the Naxalites, a far-left movement with Maoist ideology in some states in rural India that is designated by the government as a terrorist organisation on account of its violent activities. Salwa Judum later received bipartisan support from both the ruling and opposition parties.

In 2008, Chhattisgarh state, along with neighbouring Jharkhand, accounted for over 65% of total Naxal violence in the country. Chhattisgarh had trained a number of 'Special Police Officers' or SPOs (also commonly referred to as Koya Commandos), from amongst the tribespeople who were part of Salwa Judum.

== History ==
Bastar and Dantewada districts of Chhattisgarh have traditionally been sparsely populated and rich in natural resources, but also include some of the poorest tribal regions. The Naxalites progressively achieved influence and control over local tribespeople through a combination of political mobilisation—around poor governance, land rights, livelihoods, and social inequity—and force.

The first movement against the Naxalites was the Jan Jagran Abhiyan, launched in 1991 by local tribal leader Mahendra Karma. This movement was mostly led by local traders and businesspeople. When it collapsed, the leaders had to seek police protection. However, the second time around, the state had signed mining agreements with the Tata and Essar groups and was eager to cleanse the region of Naxalites to permit mining operations to run smoothly. This was the beginning of police and military support for the movement. Mahendra Karma, a Congress Member of the Legislative Assembly (MLA) and the leader of the opposition in the State Legislative Assembly, became the public front and took the Bijapur-based movement to Dantewada, Katreli, and other parts of the region.

Salwa Judum herded villagers and tribal people into makeshift camps, where human rights abuses were rife, and the movement became increasingly violent and out of control. Salwa Judum has also been accused of burning more than 600 villages, forcing 300,000 people to flee their homes. As the situation further escalated, Human Rights Watch reported atrocities on both sides and large-scale displacement of the civilian population. By early 2008, at least 100,000 civilians caught in the conflict between the Naxalites and Salwa Judum militia had fled to camps in southern Chhattisgarh or to neighbouring Andhra Pradesh. By mid-2008, that figure had grown to 150,000.

Since the inception of the movement in 2005, over 800 people have been killed by the Naxalites and security forces. This includes 300 security personnel, of which SPO deaths total 98—one in 2005; 29 in 2006; 66 in 2007; and 20 in 2008. By 2008, the Maoist rebels had altered their tactics. Operating in smaller groups, they now targeted Salwa Judum leaders and security personnel, ambushing them and stealing their weapons. Posters threatening Salwa Judum leaders continued to appear in villages across Dantewada and Bijapur districts. By mid-2008, however, Mahendra Karma announced that the movement would soon cease to exist. By the end of 2008, Salwa Judum was losing its hold in the region. The number of people living in camps dropped from 50,000 to 13,000, and public support dwindled. An NHRC report published in October 2008 stated that Salwa Judum had lost its earlier momentum and was now restricted to its 23 camps in the Dantewada and Bijapur districts of Chhattisgarh.

== Development of Special Police Officers ==
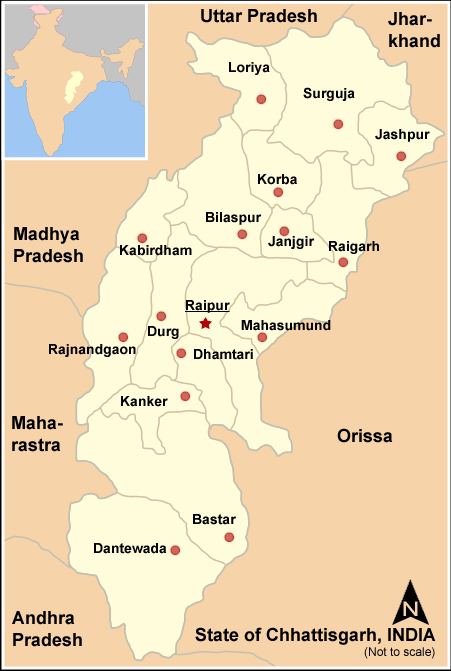
Location of Dantewada and Bastar districts, the most affected regions in Chhattisgarh

The Chhattisgarh state police employed tribal youths as Special Police Officers (SPOs), essentially a militia force used to combat Naxalism. In February 2011, the Supreme Court of India declared such arming of civilians illegal, but the Chhattisgarh government continued to arm them under another name.

Former Union Minister of Home Affairs P. Chidambaram has praised the role of SPOs in fighting Naxalism and called for their appointment "wherever required", while former Chief Minister of Chhattisgarh Raman Singh has stated that "Salwa Judum is the answer to get rid of the Naxal menace in the state." On 5 July 2011, the Supreme Court of India ordered the state of Chhattisgarh to disband any militia force founded to combat Maoist guerrillas. As reported in The Hindu, the Supreme Court directed the Chhattisgarh Police to "immediately cease and desist from using SPOs in any manner or form in any activities, directly or indirectly, aimed at controlling, countering, mitigating or otherwise eliminating Maoist/Naxalite activities" and directed the police to recall all firearms issued to these men.

== Controversies ==
=== Child soldiers ===
There have been numerous reports that Salwa Judum recruited underage boys for its armed forces. A primary survey evaluated by the Forum for Fact-finding Documentation and Advocacy determined that over 12,000 minors were being used by Salwa Judum in the southern district of Dantewada and that the Chhattisgarh government had recruited 4,200 SPOs, many of them easily identifiable as minors. The Asian Centre for Human Rights also found that Salwa Judum had engaged in the recruitment of child soldiers. Similar recruitment findings were also reported in the Coalition to Stop the Use of Child Soldiers's "Child Soldiers Global Report 2008 – India".

=== Human rights violations ===
Some human rights organisations, such as the People's Union for Civil Liberties, have made allegations against Salwa Judum. A fact-finding mission of the National Human Rights Commission of India (NHRC), appointed by the Supreme Court of India, reported that Salwa Judum was a "spontaneous reaction by the tribals to defend themselves against the reign of terror unleashed by the Naxalites." The report was submitted to the Supreme Court of India which, on the contrary, declared Salwa Judum to be illegal and unconstitutional, and ordered its disbanding.

=== State sponsoring of militias ===
In April 2008, a Supreme Court bench directed the state government to refrain from supporting and encouraging Salwa Judum: "It is a question of law and order. You cannot give arms to somebody (a civilian) and allow him to kill. You will be an abettor of the offence under Section 302 of the Indian Penal Code." The state government had earlier denied Salwa Judum being a state-sponsored movement. The Supreme Court later directed the state government to take up remedial measures suggested in the earlier NHRC report. The Human Rights Commission alleged that security forces collaborated with Salwa Judum in their fight against the Maoists.

In December 2008, replying to a petition filed with the Supreme Court, the state government acknowledged that Salwa Judum and security forces had burned houses and looted property.

In an order, the Supreme Court mentioned that people take arms for survival and against inhuman implementation of law depriving the weak, and not senselessly. The court pointed out the importance of formalised state police actions, in ways that do not ignore constitutional values:

"Given humanity's collective experience with unchecked power, which becomes its own principle and its practice its own raison d'etre, resulting in the eventual dehumanisation of all people, the scouring of the earth by the unquenchable thirst for natural resources by imperialist powers, and the horrors of two World Wars, modern Constitutionalism posits that no wielder of power should be allowed to claim the right to perpetrate the state's violence against any one, much less its own citizens, unchecked by law, and notions of innate human dignity of every individual."

== Effects ==
Encouraged by the highly effective results of the movement in the region, the government was planning to launch a people's movement in the insurgency-hit state of Manipur along similar lines. In 2006, Karnataka raised a similar force employing tribal youths to fight Naxalism in the state, as did Andhra Pradesh prior to it. Jharkhand is another state that has been successfully using SPOs to counter left-wing terrorists.

However, Salwa Judum appears to have been abandoned in Chhattisgarh state, with Chief Minister Raman Singh describing the movement as "over", because it was counterproductive and "innocent people were being killed" Singh, however, said that a "peaceful campaign" to wean locals away from supporting Maoists would continue.

- The British Channel 4's Unreported World telecast a program titled "India's Hidden War" in October 2006, on the Maoist war against the State of India.

== Darbha Ghat massacre ==
On 25 May 2013, members of the Congress party running the Parivartan Yatra, projected as preparatory campaigning for the forthcoming state elections, travelling in a convoy of vehicles after addressing rallies in Sukma, were ambushed and killed by Naxalites. The deceased included Mahendra Karma, founder and leader of the outlawed and disbanded Salwa Judum; Vidya Charan Shukla, a prominent Congress state and ex-central minister; Nand Kumar Patel, president of the Chhattisgarh Pradesh Congress Committee; his son Dinesh Patel; and ex-MLA Uday Mudaliyar, while several others were injured, including ex-MLA Phulo Devi Netam. Shukla survived the attack and was airlifted to several hospitals before dying on 11 June 2013.

In a public statement, the Naxalites claimed that they had specifically targeted Karma; he had been stabbed multiple times by a group of female Naxalites.

== See also ==
- Red corridor
- Naxalite-Maoist insurgency
- Unified Communist Party of Nepal (Maoist)
