= Chapter 17 =

Chapter Seventeen refers to a seventeenth chapter in a book.

Chapter Seventeen, Chapter 17, or Chapter XVII may also refer to:

== Television ==
- "Chapter 17" (Eastbound & Down)
- "Chapter 17" (House of Cards)
- "Chapter 17" (Legion)
- "Chapter 17" (Star Wars: Clone Wars), an episode of Star Wars: Clone Wars
- "Chapter 17: The Apostate", an episode of The Mandalorian
- "Chapter Seventeen" (Boston Public)
- "Chapter Seventeen: The Missionaries", an episode of Chilling Adventures of Sabrina
- "Chapter Seventeen: The Town That Dreaded Sundown", an episode of Riverdale

== Other uses ==
- Chapter XVII of the United Nations Charter
