= Chapter XVII of the United Nations Charter =

Chapter XVII of the United Nations Charter deals with transitional security arrangements related to World War II, which was drawing to a close at the time of the Charter's promulgation. In an exception to the Charter's peace and security provisions (UN Enemy State Clause), it allows member nations to continue attacking Japan and other enemy states until the war's end.
