= Chapter XVIII of the United Nations Charter =

Chapter XVIII of the United Nations Charter deals with amendments. The process is essentially modeled after the amendment process for the United States Constitution in that:

- A two-thirds supermajority is required for adoption;
- Ratification by a supermajority of the respective states is required;
- There are two methods of proposing amendments;
- The more common of those methods is for the "first branch" (in the case of the UN, the General Assembly) to submit an amendment to the states;
- Another method, not actually used in practice, is to call a convention to propose amendments.
- The amendment procedure itself contains a provision that does not allow states (in the case of the UN, the permanent five members of the UN Security Council) to be deprived of their suffrage (in this case, their veto and/or permanent UNSC membership) without their consent. (This is analogous to the entrenched clause contained in Article Five of the United States Constitution).

There have been several amendments to the United Nations Charter since 1945, mostly to reflect increases in the size of the organization. However, the fundamental structure has remained the same. Nonetheless, the UN amendment process arguably favors the flexibility and continued existence of the organization more than the League of Nations amendment process specified by Article 26 of the Covenant of the League of Nations, which stated, "Amendments to this Covenant will take effect when ratified by the Members of the League whose representatives compose the Council and by a majority of the Members of the League whose Representatives compose the Assembly. No such amendment shall bind any Member of the League which signifies its dissent therefrom, but in that case it shall cease to be a Member of the League."
