= Chapter X of the United Nations Charter =

Chapter X of the United Nations Charter deals with the UN Economic and Social Council. Originally, Article 61 provided that ECOSOC would consist of 18 members, but in 1965 the Charter was amended to expand ECOSOC to 27 members, before being amended to include 54 in 1971. ECOSOC's members are elected by the UN General Assembly to staggered three-year terms, and are eligible for immediate re-election. This enables countries like the United States to be de facto permanent members. Article 62 empowers ECOSOC to "make or initiate studies and reports with respect to international economic, social, cultural, educational, health, and related matters" and to make recommendations "promoting respect for, and observance of, human rights and fundamental freedoms for all." It can prepare draft conventions and call international conferences – these have included, for instance, the 1961 New York conference that drafted the Single Convention on Narcotic Drugs. Article 64 gives ECOSOC concurrent power, along with the UN General Assembly, to receive reports from specialized agencies, provided that the subject matter falls within ECOSOC's purview. Article 68 empowers it to "set up commissions in economic and social fields and for the promotion of human rights."

== Article 71 ==
Article 71 forms the basis for granting consultative status to nongovernmental organizations. There were representatives of 1,200 voluntary organizations present at the founding conference of the United Nations in San Francisco in 1945, and this article provided a mechanism for continued involvement.
