= Chapter XIII of the United Nations Charter =

Chapter XIII of the United Nations Charter deals with the UN Trusteeship Council. It guarantees each of the five permanent members of the UN Security Council a seat on the council (albeit without veto) as well as those administering trust countries, and as many other members elected by the UN General Assembly as may be necessary to have an equal number of trust-administering and non-trust-administering countries on the Trusteeship Council. The Trusteeship Council is required to make an annual report to the UNGA on each trust territory. With all territories having reached independence, the Trusteeship Council is basically dormant today. There have been proposals to transform it into a trusteeship council of the global commons (i.e. the environment), although Kofi Annan recommended abolishing it altogether in his report, In Larger Freedom.
