= Chapter IX of the United Nations Charter =

Chapter IX of the United Nations Charter deals with international economic and social cooperation. Article 55 reflects the philosophy of the UN that efforts should be made to impact the root causes of war:

With a view to the creation of conditions of stability and well-being which are necessary for peaceful and friendly relations among nations based on respect for the principle of equal rights and self-determination of peoples, the United Nations shall promote:
a. higher standards of living, full employment, and conditions of economic and social progress and development;
b. solutions of international economic, social, health, and related problems; and international cultural and educational cooperation; and
c. universal respect for, and observance of, human rights and fundamental freedoms for all without distinction as to race, sex, language, or religion.

Article 56 requires members to "take joint and separate action in co-operation with the Organization for the achievement of the purposes set forth in Article 55." Given the different socioeconomic philosophies and systems advanced by the US- and Soviet- led blocs, this was an ambitious goal. UNESCO and similar specialized agencies were brought under the UN umbrella in accordance with the provisions of this chapter. Chapter IX is analogous to Article 23 of the Covenant of the League of Nations, although the UN Charter does not mention "opium and other dangerous drugs."

Articles 55 and 56 are the only articles besides Article 1 that refer to human rights in the UN Charter. They also provide that whenever the object of the Articles is regulated by a lex specialis, the latter applies.
