= United Nations Trusteeship Council =

Intergovernmental organization organ

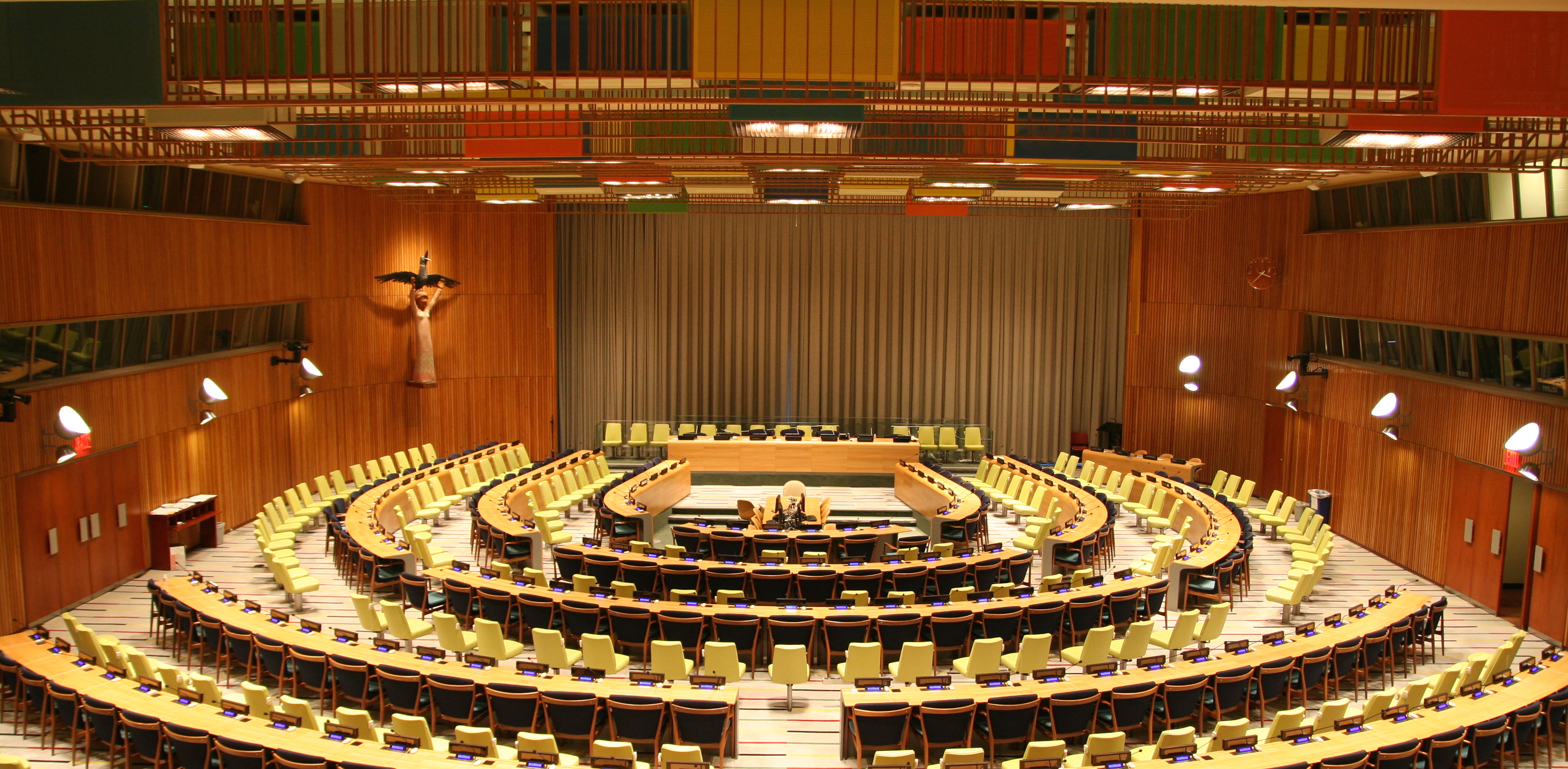
- The chamber of the UN Trusteeship Council, United Nations headquarters/UN headquarters, New York
- Formation: 1945
- Type: Principal Organ
- Legal status: Suspended
- President: Jay Dharmadhikari
- Vice President: James Kariuki
- Website: un.org/trusteeship-council

The United Nations Trusteeship Council is one of the six principal organs of the United Nations, established to help ensure that trust territories were administered in the best interests of their inhabitants and of international peace and security.

The trust territories—most of them former mandates of the League of Nations or territories taken from nations defeated at the end of World War II—have all now attained self-government or independence, either as separate nations or by joining neighbouring independent countries. The last was Palau, formerly part of the Trust Territory of the Pacific Islands, which became a member state of the United Nations in December 1994.

== History ==
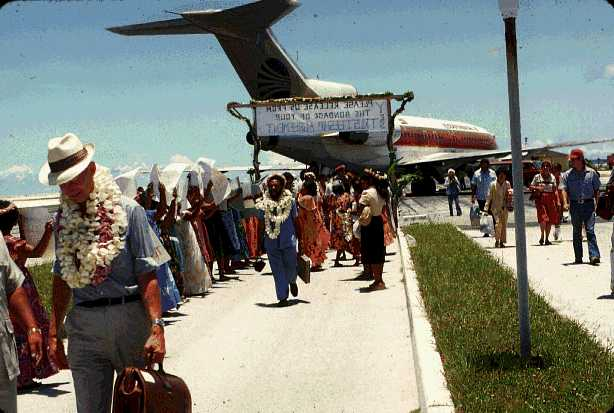
Arrival of UN Visiting Mission in Majuro, Trust Territory of the Pacific Islands (1978). The sign reads "Please release us from the bondage of your trusteeship agreement."

Provisions to form a new UN agency to oversee the decolonization of dependent territories from colonial times were made at the San Francisco Conference in 1945 and were included in Chapter 12 of the Charter of the United Nations. Those dependent territories (colonies and mandated territories) were to be placed under the international trusteeship system created by the United Nations Charter as a successor to the League of Nations mandate system. Ultimately, eleven territories were placed under trusteeship: seven in Africa and four in Oceania. Ten of the trust territories had previously been League of Nations mandates; the eleventh was the Trust Territory of Somaliland.

In order to implement the provisions of the trusteeship system, the General Assembly passed resolution 64 on 14 December 1946, establishing the United Nations Trusteeship Council. The Trusteeship Council held its first session in March 1947.

In March 1948, the United States announced a trusteeship proposal for the territory of Mandatory Palestine after the expiration of the British mandate as a peaceful solution to the ongoing 1948 Palestine war. However, the US did not make an effort to implement this proposal, which became moot with the Israeli declaration of independence in May 1948.

Under the Charter, the Trusteeship Council was to consist of representatives of United Nations member states administering trust territories and an equal number of representatives of non-administering states. Thus, the Council was to consist of (1) all U.N. members administering trust territories, (2) the five permanent members of the Security Council, and (3) as many other non-administering members as needed to equalize the number of administering and non-administering members, elected by the General Assembly for renewable three-year terms. Over time, as trust territories attained independence, the size and workload of the Trusteeship Council was reduced. Ultimately, the Trusteeship Council came to include only the five permanent Security Council members (China, France, the Soviet Union/Russian Federation, the United Kingdom, and the United States), as the only country administering a Trust Territory (the United States) was a permanent member.

With the independence of Palau, formerly part of the Trust Territory of the Pacific Islands, in 1994, there presently are no trust territories, leaving the Trusteeship Council without responsibilities. Since the Northern Mariana Islands, which was a part of the Trust Territory of the Pacific Islands, became a commonwealth of the USA in 1986, it is technically the only area not to have joined as a part of another state or gained full independence as a sovereign nation.

The Trusteeship Council was not assigned responsibility for colonial territories outside the trusteeship system, although the Charter did establish the principle that member states were to administer such territories in conformity with the best interests of their inhabitants.

== Present status ==
Current leadership

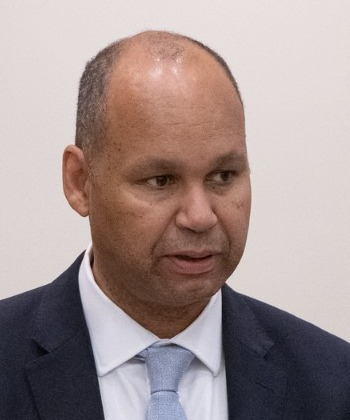
Vice-President: James Kariuki (United Kingdom)

Its mission fulfilled, the Trusteeship Council suspended its operation on 1 November 1994, and, although under the United Nations Charter it continues to exist on paper, its future role and even existence remains uncertain. The Trusteeship Council has a president and vice-president, although the sole current duty of these officers is to meet with the heads of other UN agencies on occasion. According to the United Nations website:

By a resolution adopted on 25th of May 1994, the Council amended its rules of procedure to drop the obligation to meet annually and agreed to meet as occasion required—by its decision or the decision of its President, or at the request of a majority of its members or the General Assembly or the Security Council.

The Trusteeship Council continues to hold brief formal meetings, once every two years, to elect a new President and Vice-President; by convention, the roles rotate between the deputy permanent representatives of France and the UK.

The chamber itself is still used for other purposes. Following a three-year refurbishment, restoring its original design by Danish architect Finn Juhl, the chamber was re-opened in 2013. The current president of the Trusteeship Council, as of the 75th Session, is Jay Dharmadhikari of France and the Vice-President is James Kariuki of the United Kingdom.

== Future prospects ==
The formal elimination of the Trusteeship Council would require the revision of the United Nations Charter. Though this has been proposed as part of reform of the United Nations, the political difficulties of such changes mean that these have not been enacted. Other functions for the Trusteeship Council have been considered, such as the Commission on Global Governance's 1995 Our Global Neighbourhood report which recommended expanding the trusteeship council's remit to the protection of environmental integrity and the global commons on the two-thirds of the world's surface that is outside national jurisdictions.

== Gallery ==
The world in 1945, UN Trusteeship territories are coloured teal

The world in 2010, with no trusteeship territories left

== See also ==
- American trusteeship proposal for Palestine
- United Nations list of non-self-governing territories
