= Chapter XVI of the United Nations Charter =

Chapter XVI of the United Nations Charter contains miscellaneous provisions prohibiting secret treaties, establishing the UN Charter as supreme over any other treaties, and providing for privileges and immunities of UN officials and representatives.

== Article 102 ==
Article 102 bans secret treaties. Under this article, all international treaties must be registered with, and published by, the UN Secretariat. The article also states that secret treaties concluded in violation of this provision are unenforceable before UN bodies. Secret treaties were believed to have played a role in the events leading to World War I. Accordingly, U.S. President Woodrow Wilson had proposed banning them in the 1910s, and the League of Nations had created a special bureau of treaty registration under the League of Nations Secretary-General and had set aside a section of the League of Nations Journal for treaty publication. Article 18 of the Covenant of the League of Nations held that "Every treaty or international engagement entered into hereafter by any Member of the League shall be forthwith registered with the Secretariat and shall as soon as possible be published by it. No such treaty or international engagement shall be binding until so registered," so Article 102 is basically a continuation of this policy.

== Article 103 ==
Article 103 states that members' obligations under the UN Charter override their obligations under any other treaty. Thus, countries cannot use other treaties (such as the North Atlantic Treaty) to override their UN Charter obligations, a fact that has been used to question the legality of military actions conducted under regional treaty organization auspices, such as the 1999 NATO bombing of the Federal Republic of Yugoslavia. Similarly, the Greek Cypriot and Greek governments claimed that Turkish military intervention, although authorized under the 1960 Treaty of Guarantee to maintain the status quo in Cyprus (see Cyprus dispute), was banned by UN Charter's prohibitions against the use of force, which were supreme under Article 103. Article 103 was also used by the UN Security Council, in passing Resolution 1696, to trump Iran's right to uranium enrichment under the Nuclear Nonproliferation Treaty.

Article 103 is analogous to the League of Nations Covenant Article 20, which held that "The Members of the League severally agree that this Covenant is accepted as abrogating all obligations or understandings inter se which are inconsistent with the terms thereof, and solemnly undertake that they will not hereafter enter into any engagements inconsistent with the terms thereof." The intent of both articles was to establish a "super-treaty" in much the same way that the Supremacy Clause of the United States Constitution establishes the Constitution as the supreme law of the land. This interpretation has been affirmed by the International Court of Justice.

== Articles 104 and 105 ==
Articles 104 and 105 provide for privileges and immunities of the UN and its officials and representatives. The use of this immunity has been the subject of some contention, as UN diplomats racked up $18 million in unpaid parking tickets between 1997 and 2002.
