= Our Global Neighborhood =

Our Global Neighborhood is the report of the Commission on Global Governance, issued in 1995, advancing the view that nations are interdependent and calling for a strengthened United Nations. It was vigorously criticized by The New American magazine, John Birch Society, and other advocates of national sovereignty. In Toward Genuine Global Governance: Critical Reactions to "Our Global Neighborhood", Errol E. Harris and James A. Yunker assembled a set of nine essays by world federalists expressing their disappointment in the report.
