= Commission on Global Governance =

The Commission on Global Governance was an organization co-chaired by Swedish Prime Minister Ingvar Carlsson, and former Commonwealth Secretary-General Shridath Ramphal, that produced a controversial report, Our Global Neighborhood, in 1995. The report was attacked by pro-sovereignty groups for calling for United Nations reforms that would increase its power. It also was criticized by world federalists who disliked the terminology of "global governance", which seemed clunkier than "World Federalism."

The commission was established in 1992 with the full support of United Nations Secretary-General Boutros Boutros-Ghali.

The commission made a standard definition of global governance stating that “Governance is the sum of many ways individuals and institutions, public and private, manage their common affairs. It is a continuing process through which conflicting or diverse interests may be accommodated and co-operative action taken. It includes formal institutions and regimes empowered to enforce compliance, as well as informal arrangements that people and institutions either have agreed to or perceive to be in their interest”
