= Enemy state clauses =

Passage of the UN Charter

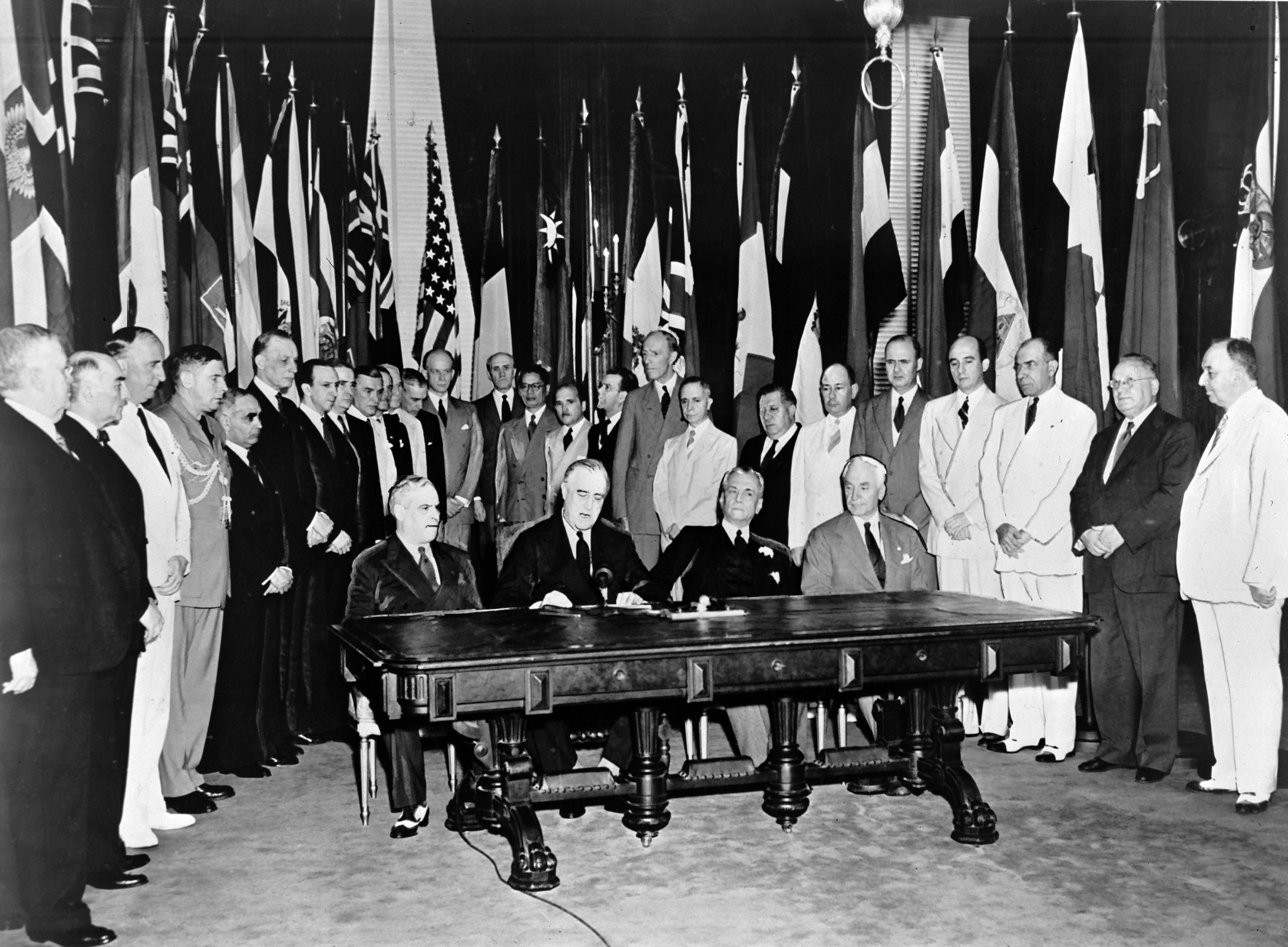
Representatives of the Allied "Big Four" signing the Declaration by United Nations in Washington, D.C., on 1 January 1942.

Enemy state clauses is a term used to refer to Article 107 and parts of Articles 53 and 77 of the United Nations (UN) Charter. They are both exceptions to the general prohibition on the use of force in relation to countries that were part of the Axis during World War II.

== Provisions ==
The enemy state clauses in the UN Charter are a set of transitional provisions tied to World War II, which includes:

- Article 53(1) allows regional organisations to take enforcement measures against an enemy state, without prior Security Council authorisation, if these measures were provided for under Article 107 or aimed at preventing a renewal of that State's aggressive policy.
- Article 53(2) defines an enemy State as any State that was an enemy of any signatory of the UN Charter during World War II. This covered, in particular, Germany, Italy, Japan, Bulgaria, Romania, Hungary, Finland and probably Thailand.
- Article 77(1)(b) includes among possible UN trusteeship territories any territories detached from enemy states as a result of World War II. In practice, the only such case placed under trusteeship was Italian Somaliland, administered by Italy.
- Article 107 says that nothing in the Charter invalidates or prevents any action in relation to an enemy state that was taken or authorised as a result of World War II by the governments responsible for such action. Those governments could also delegate such action to others.

== Current status ==
The provisions were meant for the postwar transition, which have fallen into desuetude in practice over time, especially as all former "enemy states" have now become members of the UN. However, the precise end point of "enemy state" status was unclear and was not automatically removed by UN membership, as shown by the Four Powers Agreement regarding the two German States, where Article 7 explicitly terminates the enemy state status of Germany, yet no similar arrangement has been made to other enemy states, such as Japan. A 1995 UN General Assembly resolution recognised that the enemy state clause had "become obsolete" and announced its intention to begin the process of amending the Charter as provided for in Article 108 of the UN Charter. While Germany and Japan have advocated for the deletion of these clauses from the Charter, they have not yet been removed as of 2025. The clauses still effectively prevent the two countries from obtaining permanent seats on the Security Council, since any change in membership requires the approval of two-thirds of the General Assembly members and no veto from the five permanent members of Security Council.

In November 2025, amidst the China–Japan diplomatic crisis, the Chinese embassy in Japan invoked the enemy state clauses, implying possible military action against Japan after Prime Minister Sanae Takaichi told the National Diet, in response to a hypothetical question, that a Taiwan Strait crisis could pose a "survival-threatening situation" for Japan justifying military intervention. In response, Japan claimed the clauses to be ineffective and rejected that China can take military action against it under them. On 22 September 2026, during her appearance at the general debate of the eighty-first session of the United Nations General Assembly, Prime Minister Takaichi called Japan a "peace-loving nation" and said enemy state clauses "must be deleted", saying "I would like to strongly emphasize this position as Japan has the pride and honor of its significant contributions to the efforts of the United Nations over the last 70 years".

== See also ==
- Axis powers
- United Nations
- United Nations Security Council
