= Forum for Fact-finding Documentation and Advocacy =

Indian human rights monitoring organization

- Type: Nonprofit

The Forum for Fact-finding Documentation and Advocacy (FFDA) is an Indian human rights monitoring organization founded in 1995 that fights to promote and protect human rights in India by working with the victims of human rights violations and their organizations. It educates the victims and their communities, and facilitates and builds the capacity of organizations of victims to take collective action on their own. It addresses the issues of displacement and forced eviction, violence against women and children, exploitation, torture, abuse and discrimination against Dalits (untouchable and low caste poor), and attacks on minorities and indigenous communities.

Based on learning and work experiences, FFDA integrated democracy monitoring into its core activity as the basic path to rights for the above-mentioned target group; participating in decision making and asking for accountability and good governance of the state in particular. It focuses on having a right to:

- Social and political participation
- A sustainable livelihood
- Education, particularly access for girls and tribal children
- Life and security
- Identity

FFDA investigates, reports on, and campaigns against human rights abuses. Tribal and Dalit people, especially women and children, are its priority. FFDA was led by Subash Mohapatra.

== Aims and beliefs ==
FFDA dreams of a humane society where there will be freedom, justice, peace, and inherent dignity for all people. In India, FFDA's goal is a just social and humane order without class and caste-dominated economic, social, cultural, civil, and political structures.

FFDA's goals are:

1. Promotion, protection, and respect for human rights in the fight against political, institutional, and social oppression in India.
2. Promotion and strengthening of the people's organizations.
3. Protection of human rights of deprived communities, especially indigenous tribes, women, children, Dalits and other victims of human rights violations.
4. Human rights institution building.
5. Promotion and protection of democracy as the basic part of accountability and transparency of the state.

== Successes ==
=== Prevention of child marriages ===
Child marriages persist in rural India, although prohibited by Indian legislation since 1929. Such traditional marriages continue to be organised in massive numbers, principally in the poorest of families. Today, 33% of girls in India are married before they reach the age of 15. Another third are already married by 18, the legal age limit for marriage. It is a traditional ritual that affects primarily girls: apart from the fact that they are not physically equipped to give birth, forcing a child between the ages of 11 and 15 to marry condemns her to a life of illiteracy, economic dependency and psychological and physical incapacity. In 2003, FFDA filed a public interest litigation before Supreme Court of India seeking a ban on child marriages in India. The apex court directed to enact a new preventative law.

=== Tribal people fight for land rights ===
In 2000, 26 families got their land back (225 acres). 47 other land cases are pending.

In 2001, a steel company funded by the International Monetary Fund displaced 3000 tribal people from their land. 250 people were then employed by the company. The tribal women went to the forest to collect leaves and roots to eat. Foresters and police forced the women to leave. When the women protested, the police and foresters kidnapped, raped and beat them in a government office. FFDA is helping the women to publicise the atrocities and take legal action.

=== Organising against genetically modified food and environmental destruction ===
FFDA is exposing how genetically modified (GM) food makes people ill. In 1999, 30,000 people died in a cyclone in Orissa. CARE International and Catholic Relief Services gave GM bulgur wheat to survivors. After six months, thousands of people became ill from the wheat. FFDA picketed CARE International offices. After a long battle, the Indian government in the last week of February 2003 banned the GM food supplies by overseas organizations.

FFDA publicises the consequences of the mining industry's destruction of the hills in Orissa.

=== First lesbian marriage in India ===
Mr Mohapatra, the team leader of FFDA, provided legal expertise for and was a witness at the first official lesbian marriage anywhere in India of two young tribal women in Chhattisgarh.
