= Charter of the United Nations =

1945 foundational treaty of the United Nations

- UN Charter
- Drafted: 14 August 1941
- Signed: 26 June 1945
- Location: San Francisco, California, United States
- Effective: 24 October 1945
- Condition: Ratification by China, France, the Soviet Union, the United Kingdom, the United States and by a majority of the other signatory states
- Parties: 193
- Depositary: The Government of the United States of America
- Languages: Arabic, Chinese, English, French, Russian, and Spanish

Full text
- Charter of the United Nations at Wikisource

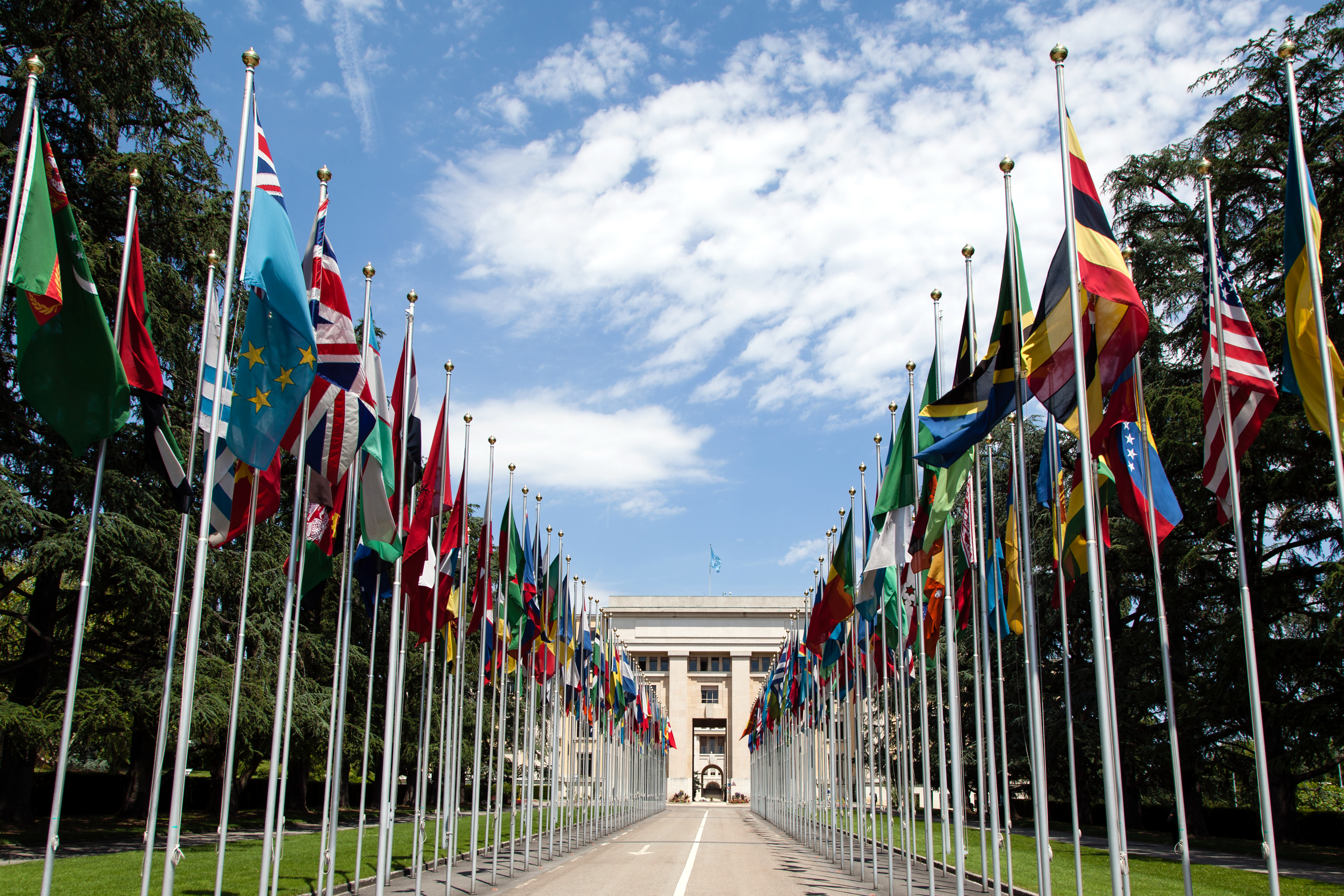
The United Nations Office at Geneva (Switzerland) is its second-biggest centre after the UN headquarters in New York City.

The Charter of the United Nations, also referred to as the UN Charter, is the foundational treaty of the United Nations that founded the organization. It establishes the purposes, governing structure, and overall framework of the United Nations System, including its principal organs: the Secretariat, the General Assembly, the Security Council, the Economic and Social Council, the International Court of Justice, and the Trusteeship Council. The UN Charter is an important part of public international law, and is the foundation for much of international law governing the use of force, pacific settlement of disputes, arms control, and other important functions of the maintenance of international peace and security.

According to its Charter, the purposes of the United Nations include reaffirming fundamental human rights; maintaining international peace and security; and promoting the economic and social advancement of all peoples. The UN Charter mandates the UN and its member states to maintain international peace and security, uphold international law, achieve "higher standards of living" for their citizens, address "economic, social, health, and related problems", and promote "universal respect for, and observance of, human rights and fundamental freedoms for all without distinction as to race, sex, language, or religion". As a charter and constituent treaty, its rules and obligations are binding on all members and supersede those of other treaties.

During the Second World War, the Allies (formally known as the United Nations) agreed to establish a new postwar international organization. Pursuant to this goal, the UN Charter was discussed, prepared, and drafted during the San Francisco Conference that began 25 April 1945, which involved most of the world's sovereign nations. Following two-thirds approval of each part, the final text was unanimously adopted by delegates and opened for signature on 26 June 1945; it was signed in San Francisco, California, United States, by 50 of the 51 original member countries. (Note: Poland's provisional government, which was not represented at the conference, signed it two months later.)

The Charter entered into force on 24 October 1945, following ratification by the five permanent members of the United Nations Security Council (United States, China, (Note: Republic of China, after 1949 located in Taiwan; replaced on 25 October 1971 by the People's Republic of China.) France, (Note: Provisional Government; later replaced by the Fourth Republic in 1946 then the Fifth Republic in 1958.) Soviet Union, (Note: Replaced by the Russian Federation in 1991.) and United Kingdom) and a majority of the other signatories; this is considered the official starting date of the United Nations, with the first session of the General Assembly, representing all 51 initial members, opening in London the following January. The General Assembly formally recognized 24 October as United Nations Day in 1947, and declared it an official international holiday in 1971. With 193 parties, most countries have now ratified the Charter.

== Summary ==
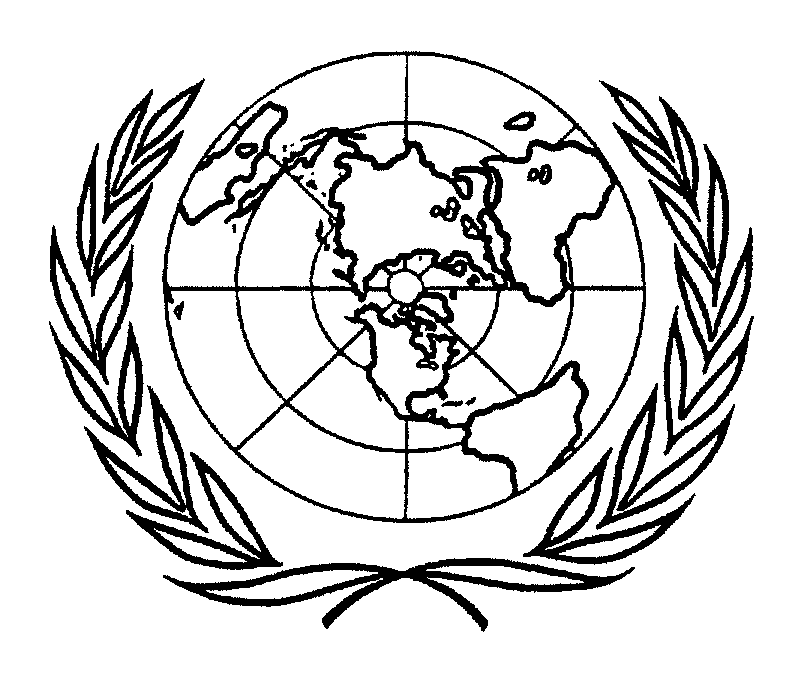
Insignia appeared in the frontispiece of the charter, prototype of the current logo of the United Nations

The charter consists of a preamble and 111 articles grouped into 19 chapters.

The preamble consists of two principal parts. The first part contains a general call for the maintenance of peace and international security and respect for human rights. The second part of the preamble is a declaration in a contractual style that the governments of the peoples of the United Nations have agreed to the Charter and it is the first international document regarding human rights.

- Chapter I sets forth the purposes of the United Nations, including the important provisions of the maintenance of international peace and security.
- Chapter II defines the criteria for membership in the United Nations.
- Chapters III–XV, the bulk of the document, describe the organs and institutions of the UN and their respective powers.
- Chapters XVI and Chapter XVII describe arrangements for integrating the UN with established international law.
- Chapters XVIII and Chapter XIX provide for amendment and ratification of the Charter.

The following chapters deal with the enforcement powers of UN bodies:

- Chapter VI describes the Security Council's power to investigate and mediate disputes;
- Chapter VII describes the Security Council's power to authorize economic, diplomatic, and military sanctions, as well as the use of military force, to resolve disputes;
- Chapter VIII makes it possible for regional arrangements to maintain peace and security within their own region;
- Chapters IX and Chapter X describe the UN's powers for economic and social cooperation, and the Economic and Social Council that oversee these powers;
- Chapters XII and Chapter XIII describe the Trusteeship Council, which oversaw decolonization;
- Chapters XIV and Chapter XV establish the powers of, respectively, the International Court of Justice and the United Nations Secretariat;
- Chapters XVI through Chapter XIX deal, respectively, with XVI: miscellaneous provisions, XVII: transitional security arrangements related to World War II, XVIII: the charter amendment process, and XIX: ratification of the charter.

Article 2(7) of the UN Charter explicitly recognizes the sovereignty of states and prohibits the United Nations from intervening in matters that are "essentially within the domestic jurisdiction" of any state. The only exception is actions authorized by the Security Council under Chapter VII of the UN Charter to maintain international peace and security.

== History ==
=== Background ===
The principles and conceptual framework of the United Nations were formulated through a series of conferences during the Second World War. The Declaration of St James's Palace, issued in London on 12 June 1941, was the first joint statement of the declared goals and principles of the Allies, and the first to express a vision for a postwar world order. The Declaration called for the "willing cooperation of free peoples" so that "all may enjoy economic and social security".

Roughly two months later, the United States and the United Kingdom issued a joint, eight-point statement elaborating such goals, known as the Atlantic Charter. It set out (1) that these countries do not seek aggrandizement, (2) that no territorial changes be made against the wishes of the people, (2) the right to self-determination for all peoples, (3) restoration of self-government to those deprived of it, (4) furtherance of access for all states to trade and raw materials "needed for their economic prosperity", (5) global cooperation to secure better economic and social conditions for the world, (6) the "destruction of the Nazi tyranny" and freedom from fear and want, (7) freedom of the seas, and (8) "abandonment of the use of force" by disarming nations of "aggression" and establishing a wider Anglo-American world "security system" under mutual disarmament after the war. Many of these principles would inspire or form part of the UN Charter.

The following year, on 1 January 1942, representatives of thirty nations formally at war with the Axis powers—led by the "Big Four" powers of China, the Soviet Union, the UK, and the U.S.—signed the Declaration by United Nations, which formalized the anti-Axis alliance and reaffirmed the purposes and principles of the Atlantic Charter. The following day, representatives of twenty-two other nations added their signatures. The term "United Nations" became synonymous with the Allies for the duration of the war, and was considered the formal name under which they were fighting. The Declaration by United Nations formed the basis of the United Nations Charter; virtually all nations that acceded to it would be invited to take part in the 1945 San Francisco Conference to discuss and prepare the Charter.

On 30 October 1943, the Declaration of the Four Nations, one of the four Moscow Declarations, was signed by the foreign ministers of the Big Four, calling for the establishment of a "general international organization, based on the principle of the sovereign equality of all peace-loving states, and open to membership by all such states, large and small, for the maintenance of international peace and security". (Note: Some sources, such as the United Nations, refer to Declaration of the Four Nations as the "Moscow Declaration".) This was the first formal announcement that a new international organization was being contemplated to replace the moribund League of Nations.

Pursuant to the Moscow Declarations, from 21 August 1944 to 7 October 1944, the U.S. hosted the Dumbarton Oaks Conference to develop a blueprint for what would become the United Nations. Many of the rules, principles, and provisions of the UN Charter were proposed during the conference, including the structure of the UN system; the creation of a "Security Council" to prevent future war and conflict; and the establishment of other "organs" of the organization, such as the General Assembly, International Court of Justice, and Secretariat. The conference was led by the Big Four, with delegates from other nation participating in the consideration and formulation of these principles. At the Paris peace conference in 1919, it was Prime Minister Jan Smuts of South Africa and Lord Cecil of the United Kingdom who came up with the structure of the League of Nations with the League being divided into a League Assembly consisting of all the member states and a League Council consisting of the great powers. The same design that Smuts and Cecil had devised for the League of Nations was copied for the United Nations with a Security Council made up of the great powers and a General Assembly of the UN member states.

The subsequent Yalta Conference in February 1945 between the U.S., the UK, and the Soviet Union resolved the lingering debate regarding the voting structure of the proposed Security Council, calling for a "Conference of United Nations" in San Francisco on 25 April 1945 to "prepare the charter of such an organization, along the lines proposed in the formal conversations of Dumbarton Oaks."

=== Drafting and adoption ===
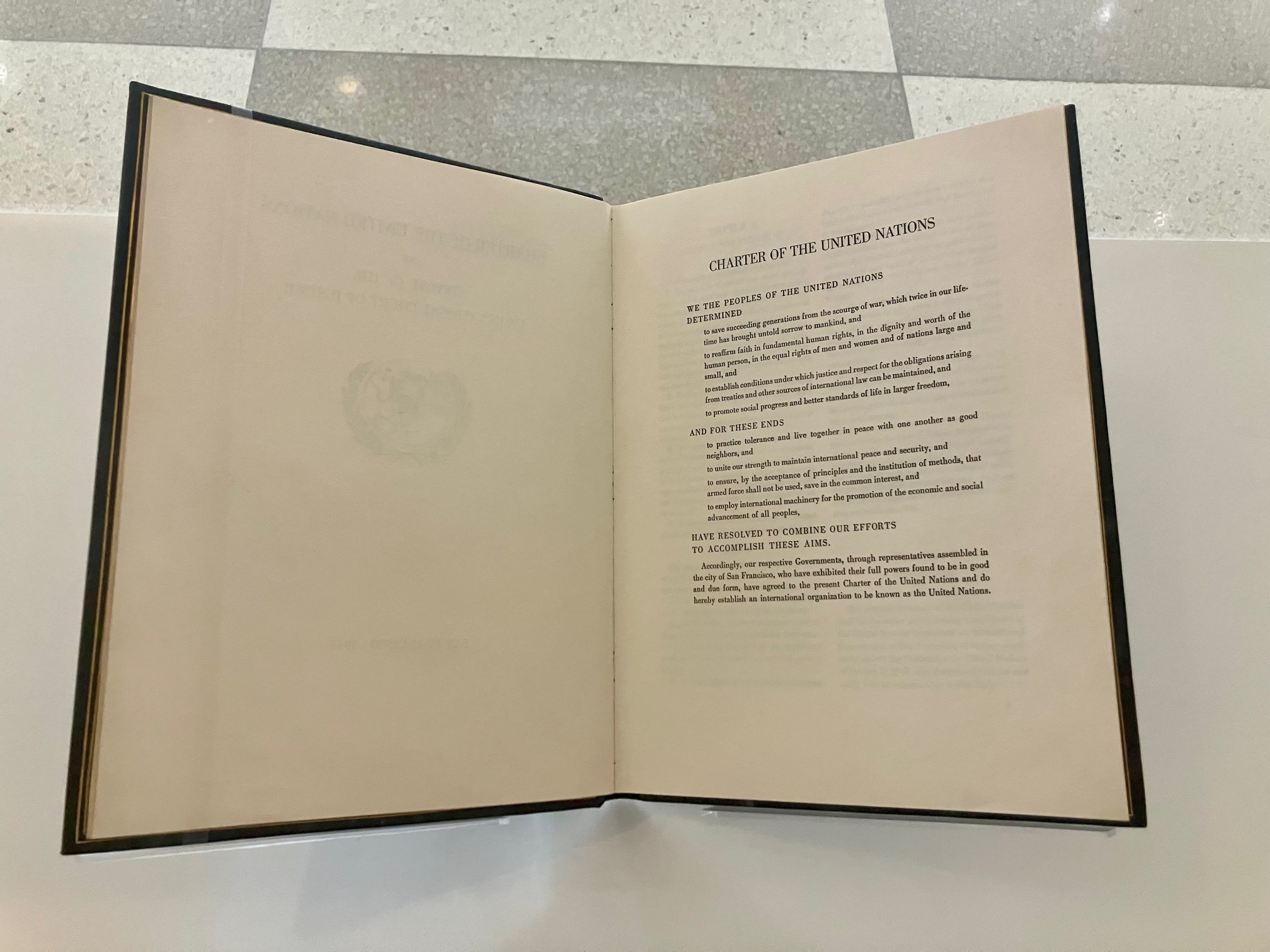
Charter of the United Nations on display at UN headquarters in New York

The San Francisco Conference, formally the United Nations Conference on International Organization (UNCIO), began as scheduled on 25 April 1945 with the goal of drafting a charter that would create a new international organization. The Big Four, which sponsored the event, invited all forty-six signatories to the Declaration by United Nations. (Note: Poland, despite having signed the Declaration by United Nations, did not attend the conference because there was no consensus on the formation of the postwar Polish government. Therefore, a space was left blank for the Polish signature. The new Polish government was formed after the conference (28 June) and signed the United Nations Charter on 15 October, making Poland one of the founding countries of the United Nations.) Conference delegates invited four more nations: the Belorussian Soviet Socialist Republic, the Ukrainian Soviet Socialist Republic, Argentina and recently liberated Denmark.

The conference was perhaps the largest international gathering up to that point, with 850 delegates, along with advisers and organizers, for a total of 3,500 participants. An additional 2,500 representatives from media and various civil society groups were also in attendance. Plenary meetings involving all delegates were chaired on a rotational basis by the lead delegates of the Big Four. Several committees were formed to facilitate and address different aspects of the drafting process, with more than 400 meetings convened in the subsequent weeks. Following multiple reviews, debates, and revisions, a final full meeting was held on 25 June 1945 with the final proposed draft posed to attendees. Following unanimous approval, the Charter was signed by delegates the following day in Veterans' Memorial Hall.

By 24 October 1945, enough nations had ratified the Charter to officially bring the United Nations into existence.

== Provisions ==
=== Preamble ===
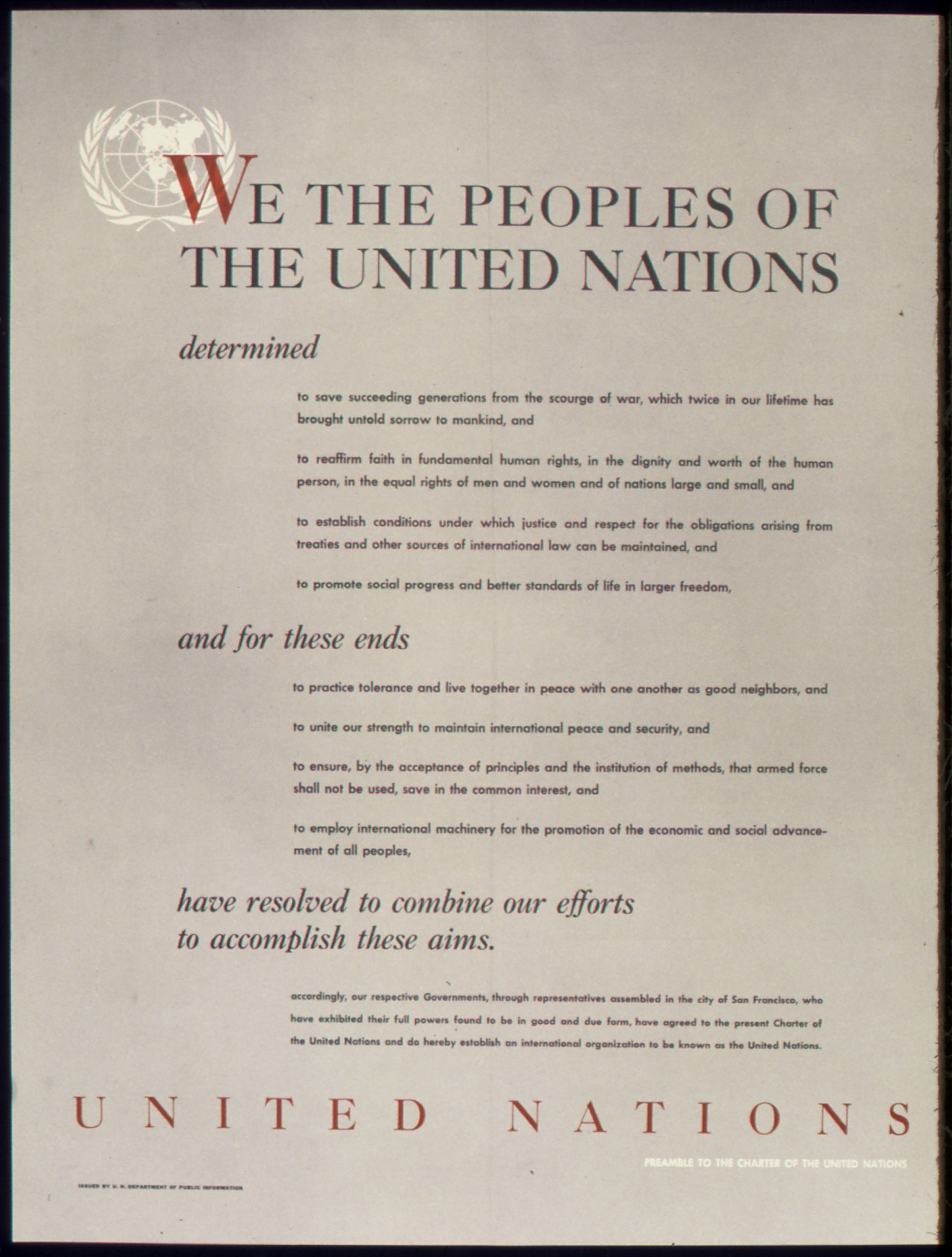
United States World War II poster containing the Preamble to the Charter of the United Nations

The Preamble to the treaty reads as follows:

WE THE PEOPLES OF THE UNITED NATIONS DETERMINED

- to save succeeding generations from the scourge of war, which twice in our lifetime has brought untold sorrow to mankind, and
- to reaffirm faith in fundamental human rights, in the dignity and worth of the human person, in the equal rights of men and women and of nations large and small, and
- to establish conditions under which justice and respect for the obligations arising from treaties and other sources of international law can be maintained, and
- to promote social progress and better standards of life in larger freedom,

AND FOR THESE ENDS

- to practice tolerance and live together in peace with one another as good neighbours, and
- to unite our strength to maintain international peace and security, and
- to ensure, by the acceptance of principles and the institution of methods, that armed force shall not be used, save in the common interest, and
- to employ international machinery for the promotion of the economic and social advancement of all peoples,

HAVE RESOLVED TO COMBINE OUR EFFORTS TO ACCOMPLISH THESE AIMS.

Accordingly, our respective Governments, through representatives assembled in the city of San Francisco, who have exhibited their full powers found to be in good and due form, have agreed to the present Charter of the United Nations and do hereby establish an international organization to be known as the United Nations.

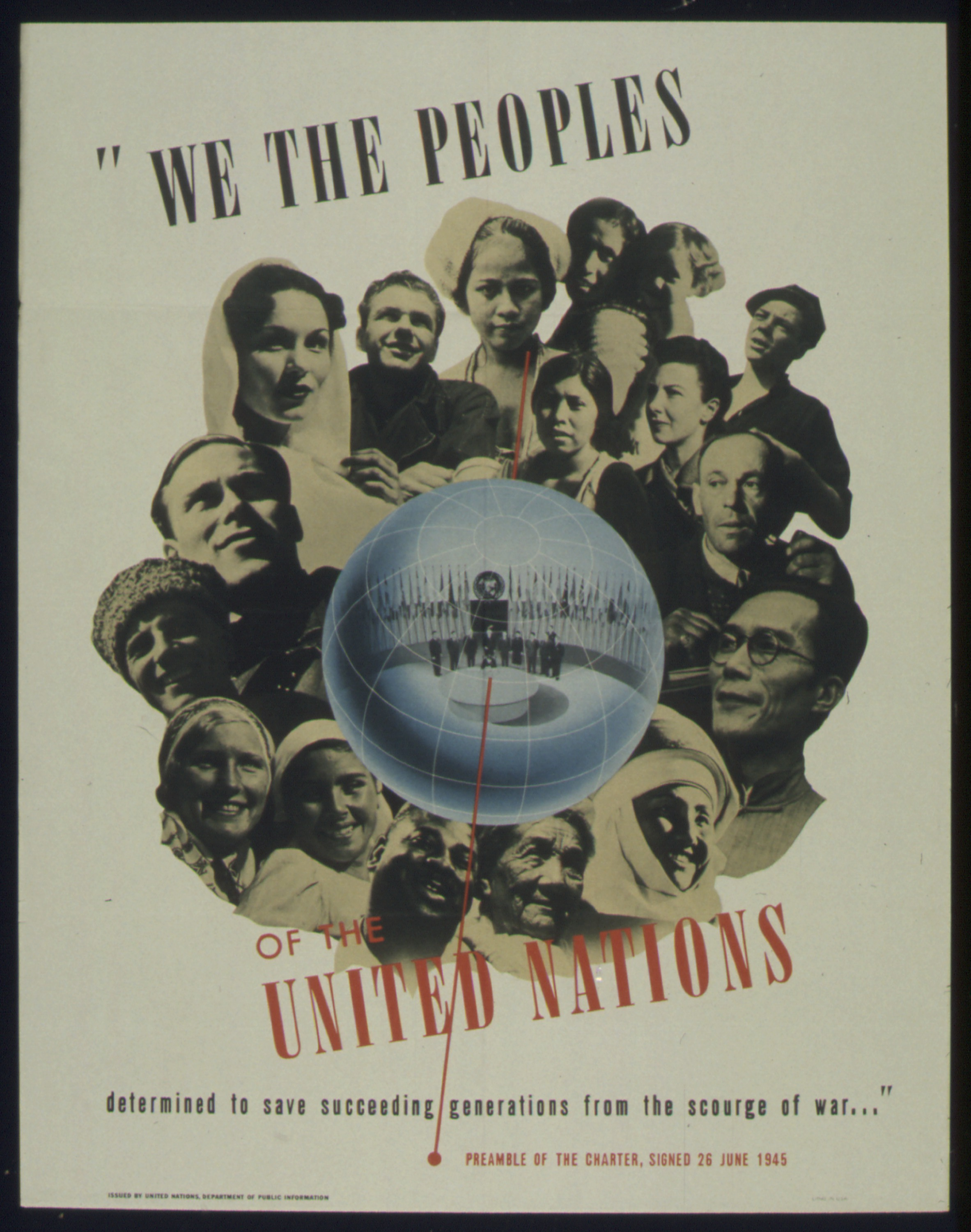
World War II poster with the first line of the Preamble, "We the peoples of the United Nations"

Although the Preamble is an integral part of the Charter, it does not set out any of the rights or obligations of member states; its purpose is to serve as an interpretative guide for the provisions of the Charter through the highlighting of some of the core motives of the founders of the organization.

=== Chapter I: Purposes and Principles ===
==== Article 1 ====
The Purposes of the United Nations are

1. To maintain international peace and security, to take effective collective measures for the prevention and removal of threats to the peace, and for the suppression of acts of aggression or other breaches of the peace, and to bring about by peaceful means, and in conformity with the principles of justice and international law, adjustment or settlement of international disputes or situations which might lead to a breach of the peace;
2. To develop friendly relations among nations based on respect for the principle of equal rights and self-determination of peoples, and to take other appropriate measures to strengthen universal peace;
3. To achieve international co-operation in solving international problems of an economic, social, cultural, or humanitarian character, and in promoting and encouraging respect for human rights and for fundamental freedoms for all without distinction as to race, sex, language, or religion; and
4. To be a centre for harmonizing the actions of nations in the attainment of these common ends.

==== Article 2 ====
The Organization and its Members, in pursuit of the Purposes stated in Article 1, shall act in accordance with the following Principles:

1. The Organization is based on the principle of the sovereign equality of all its Members.
2. All Members, in order to ensure, to all of them the rights and benefits resulting from membership, shall fulfill in good faith the obligations assumed by them in accordance with the present Charter.
3. All Members shall settle their international disputes by peaceful means in such a manner that international peace and security, and justice, are not endangered.
4. All Members shall refrain in their international relations from the threat or use of force against the territorial integrity or political independence of any state, or in any other manner inconsistent with the Purposes of the United Nations.
5. All Members shall give the United Nations every assistance in any action it takes in accordance with the present Charter and shall refrain from giving assistance to any state against which the United Nations is taking preventive or enforcement action.
6. The Organization shall ensure that states which are not Members of the United Nations act in accordance with these Principles so far as may be necessary for the maintenance of international peace and security.
7. Nothing contained in the present Charter shall authorize the United Nations to intervene in matters which are essentially within the domestic jurisdiction of any state or shall require the Members to submit such matters to settlement under the present Charter; but this principle shall not prejudice the application of enforcement measures under Chapter VII of the United Nations Charter.

=== Chapter II: Membership ===
Chapter II of the United Nations Charter deals with membership of the United Nations organization.

=== Chapter III: Organs ===
1. There are established as principal organs of the United Nations: a General Assembly, a Security Council, an Economic and Social Council, a Trusteeship Council, an International Court of Justice, and a Secretariat.
2. Such subsidiary organs as may be found necessary may be established in accordance with the present Charter.

=== Chapter V: The Security Council ===
COMPOSITION

Article 23

1. The Security Council shall consist of fifteen Members of the United Nations. The Republic of China, France, the Union of Soviet Socialist Republics, the United Kingdom of Great Britain and Northern Ireland, and the United States of America shall be permanent members of the Security Council. The General Assembly shall elect ten other Members of the United Nations to be non-permanent members of the Security Council, due regard being specially paid, in the first instance to the contribution of Members of the United Nations to the maintenance of international peace and security and to the other purposes of the Organization, and also to equitable geographical distribution.
2. The non-permanent members of the Security Council shall be elected for a term of two years. In the first election of the non-permanent members after the increase of the membership of the Security Council from eleven to fifteen, two of the four additional members shall be chosen for a term of one year. A retiring member shall not be eligible for immediate re-election.
3. Each member of the Security Council shall have one representative.

FUNCTIONS AND POWERS

Article 24

1. In order to ensure prompt and effective action by the United Nations, its Members confer on the Security Council primary responsibility for the maintenance of international peace and security and agree that in carrying out its duties under this responsibility the Security Council acts on their behalf.
2. In discharging these duties the Security Council shall act in accordance with the Purposes and Principles of the United Nations. The specific powers granted to the Security Council for the discharge of these duties are laid down in Chapters VI, VII, VIII, and XII.
3. The Security Council shall submit annual and, when necessary, special reports to the General Assembly for its consideration.

Article 25

The Members of the United Nations agree to accept and carry out the decisions of the Security Council in accordance with the present Charter.

Article 26

In order to promote the establishment and maintenance of international peace and security with the least diversion for armaments of the world's human and economic resources, the Security Council shall be responsible for formulating, with the assistance of the Military Staff Committee referred to in Article 47, plans to be submitted to the Members of the United Nations for the establishment of a system for the regulation of armaments.

VOTING

Article 27

1. Each member of the Security Council shall have one vote.
2. Decisions of the Security Council on procedural matters shall be made by an affirmative vote of nine members.
3. Decisions of the Security Council on all other matters shall be made by an affirmative vote of nine members including the concurring votes of the permanent members; provided that, in decisions under Chapter VI, and under paragraph 3 of Article 52, a party to a dispute shall abstain from voting.

PROCEDURE

Article 28

1. The Security Council shall be so organized as to be able to function continuously. Each member of the Security Council shall for this purpose be represented at all times at the seat of the Organization.
2. The Security Council shall hold periodic meetings at which each of its members may, if it so desires, be represented by a member of the government or by some other specially designated representative.
3. The Security Council may hold meetings at such places other than the seat of the Organization as in its judgment will best facilitate its work.

Article 29

The Security Council may establish as such subsidiary organs as it deems necessary for the performance of its functions.

Article 30

The Security Council shall adopt its own rules of the procedure, including the method of selecting its president.

Article 31

Any Member of the United Nations which is not a member of the Security Council may participate, without vote, in the discussion of any question brought before the Security Council whenever the latter considers that the interests of that Member are specially affected.

Article 32

Any Member of the United Nations which is not a member of the Security Council or any state which is not a Member of the United Nations, if it is a party to a dispute under consideration by the Security Council, shall be invited to participate, without vote, in the discussion relating to the dispute. The Security Council shall lay down such conditions as it deems just for the participation of a state which is not a Member of the United Nations.

=== Chapter VII: Action with respect to Threats to the Peace, Breaches of the Peace, and Acts of Aggression ===
Under Article 39 of the Charter, the Security Council has primary responsibility for keeping international peace and security, and is specifically authorized to respond to threats to peace, breaches of the peace, and acts of aggression. When the Security Council has determined that a threat to peace, breach of the peace, or act of aggression exists, Article 42 gives the Security Council the authority to take "such action by air, sea, or land forces as may be necessary to maintain or restore international peace and security." Moreover, in this circumstance, Article 41 gives the Security Council the authority to completely or partially interrupt economic relations, as well as to embargo rail, sea, and air travel; block postal, telegraphic, radio, and other communications; and to sever diplomatic relations.

==== Article 39 ====
The Security Council shall determine the existence of any threat to the peace, breach of the peace, or act of aggression and shall make recommendations, or decide what measures shall be taken in accordance with Articles 41 and 42, to maintain or restore international peace and security.

==== Article 41 ====
The Security Council may decide what measures not involving the use of armed force are to be employed to give effect to its decisions, and it may call upon the Members of the United Nations to apply such measures. These may include complete or partial interruption of economic relations and of rail, sea, air, postal, telegraphic, radio, and other means of communication, and the severance of diplomatic relations.

==== Article 42 ====
Should the Security Council consider that measures provided for in Article 41 would be inadequate or have proved to be inadequate, it may take such action by air, sea, or land forces as may be necessary to maintain or restore international peace and security. Such action may include demonstrations, blockade, and other operations by air, sea, or land forces of Members of the United Nations.

==== Article 49 ====
The Members of the United Nations shall join in affording mutual assistance in carrying out the measures decided upon by the Security Council.

==== Article 51 ====
Nothing in the present Charter shall impair the inherent right of individual or collective self-defence if an armed attack occurs against a Member of the United Nations, until the Security Council has taken measures necessary to maintain international peace and security. Measures taken by Members in the exercise of this right of self-defence shall be immediately reported to the Security Council and shall not in any way affect the authority and responsibility of the Security Council under the present Charter to take at any time such action as it deems necessary in order to maintain or restore international peace and security.

=== Chapter XV: The Secretariat ===
Overview

- It comprises the Secretary-General and such other staff as the organization may require.
- It provides services to the other organs of the United Nations, such as the General Assembly, the Security Council, the Economic and Social Council (ECOSOC), and the trusteeship council, as well as their subsidiary bodies.
- The Secretary-General is appointed by the General Assembly on the recommendation of Security Council.
- The staff of the secretariat is appointed by the Secretary-General according to the regulations laid down by the General Assembly.
- The secretariat is located at the headquarters of the UN in New York.
- The secretariat also includes the regional commission secretariat at Baghdad, Bangkok, Geneva and Santiago.

==== Functions of the Secretariat ====
1. preparation of report and other documents containing information, analysis, historical background research finding, policy suggestions and so forth, to facilitate deliberations and decision making by other organs.
2. to facilitate legislative organs and their subsidiary bodies.
3. provision of meeting services for the General Assembly and other organs
4. provision of editorial, translation and document reproduction services for the issuance of UN documents in different language.
5. conduct of studies and provision of information to various member states in meeting challenge in various fields
6. preparation of statistical publication, information bulletin and analytical work which the General Assembly has decided
7. organization of conferences experts group meetings and seminar on topics of concern to the international community
8. provision of technical assistance to develop countries.
9. understanding of service mission to countries, areas or location as authorized by the General Assembly or the security

=== Chapter XVI: Miscellaneous Provisions ===
Article 103 of the Charter provides that in the situation of a conflict between obligations under the UN Charter and those under any other international agreement, the UN Charter's obligations take precedence.

=== Chapter XVIII: Amendments ===
The General Assembly has the power to amend the UN Charter. Amendments adopted by a vote of two-thirds of the members of the Assembly need to be ratified by two-thirds of the Member-States, including all the Permanent Members of the Security Council.

=== Chapter XIX: Ratification and Signature ===
Provided that the Charter would enter into force once ratified by the Permanent Five members of the United Nations Security Council and a majority of the other signatory states, and set forth related procedures, such as providing certified copies to ratifying governments.

== See also ==
- United Nations
- United Nations System
- United Nations Security Council
- Command responsibility
- History of the United Nations
- History of United Nations peacekeeping
- Nuremberg Principles
- UN Enemy State Clause
- Universal Declaration of Human Rights
