= List of diplomatic visits to the United States from Africa =

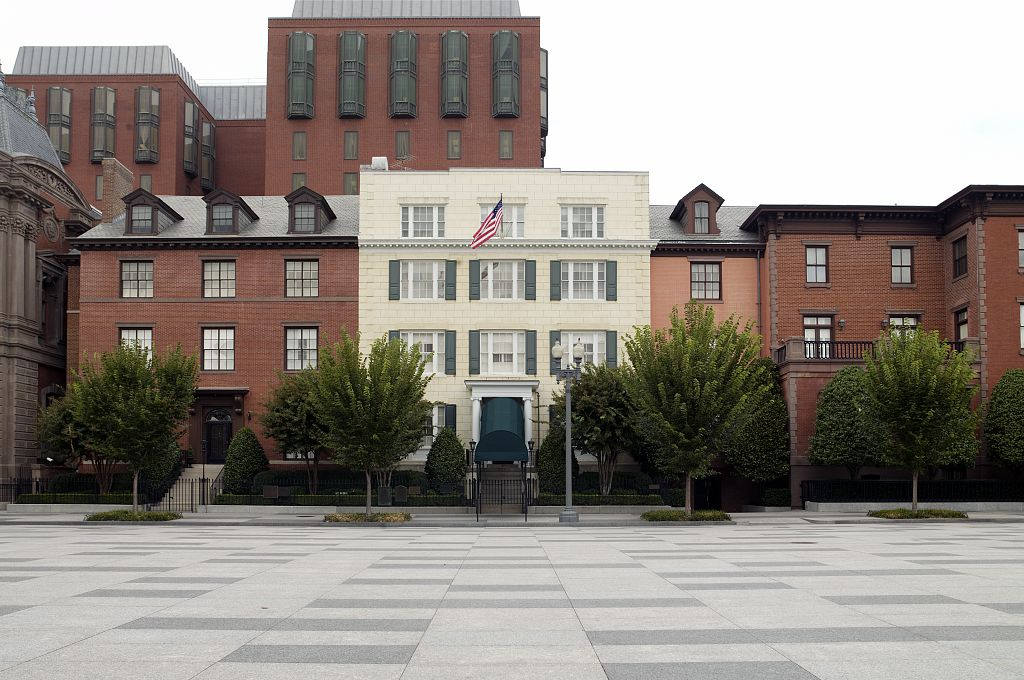
The President's Guest House, commonly known as Blair House has been the official guest house of visiting dignitaries in Washington D.C. since 1824

International trips made by the heads of state and heads of government to the United States have become a valuable part of American diplomacy and international relations since such trips were first made in the mid-19th century. They are complicated undertakings that often require months of planning along with a great deal of coordination and communication.

The first international visit to the United States was made by King Kalakaua of Hawaii in 1874, which was the first visit by a foreign chief of state or head of government.

The first African head of state to visit the United States was President Edwin Barclay of Liberia in 1943.

== Algeria ==
Table of trips
Dates	Guest	Title	Reason
October 9–15, 1962	Ahmed Ben Bella	President	Informal visit to Washington D.C. while attending the United Nations General Assembly session. First foreign leader to receive a welcoming ceremony on the South Lawn of the White House.
April 11, 1974	Houari Boumedienne	President	Private visit to Washington, D.C. while attending the U.N. General Assembly session.
April 16–22, 1985	Chadli Bendjedid	President	State visit; visited Los Angeles, Fresno, and San Francisco.
July 11–14, 2001	Abdelaziz Bouteflika	President	Working visit
November 5, 2001	Abdelaziz Bouteflika	President	Met with President Bush during a private visit.
June 9–10, 2004	Abdelaziz Bouteflika	President	Met with President Bush during the 30th G8 summit in Sea Island, Georgia.
September 23, 2009	Abdelaziz Bouteflika	President	Attended the 64th Session of the United Nations General Assembly.
August 4–6, 2014	Abdelmalek Sellal	Prime Minister	Attended the U.S.-Africa Leaders' Summit.
March 31 – April 1, 2016	Abdelmalek Sellal	Prime Minister	Attended the Nuclear Security Summit.
December 13–15, 2022	Aymen Benabderrahmane	Prime Minister	Attended the U.S.-Africa Leaders' Summit.
September 19, 2023	Abdelmadjid Tebboune	President	Attended the 78th United Nations General Assembly.

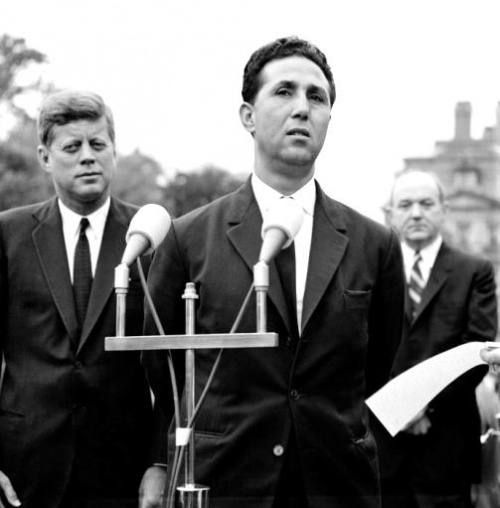

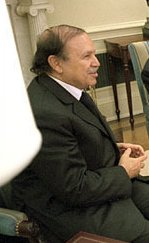

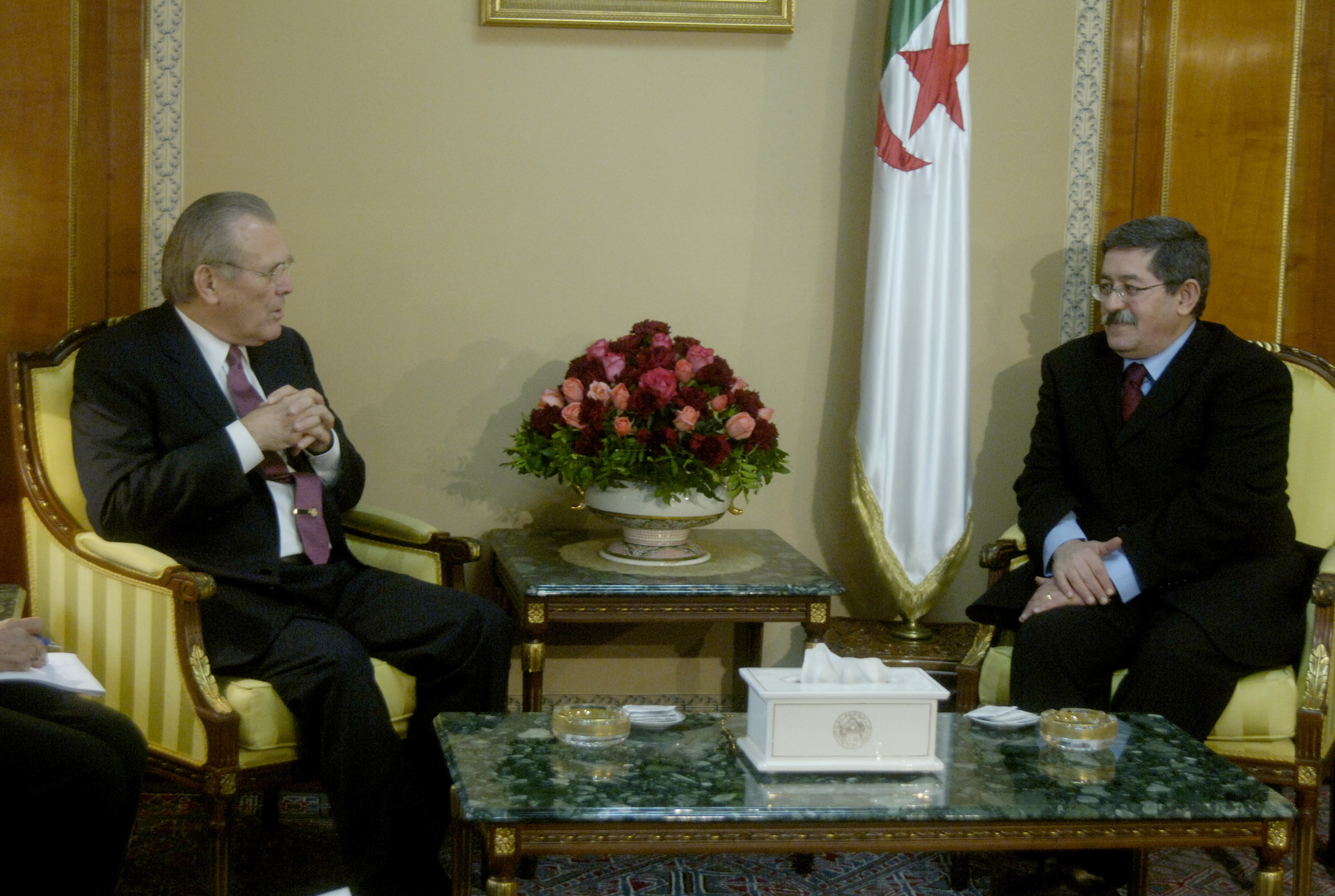

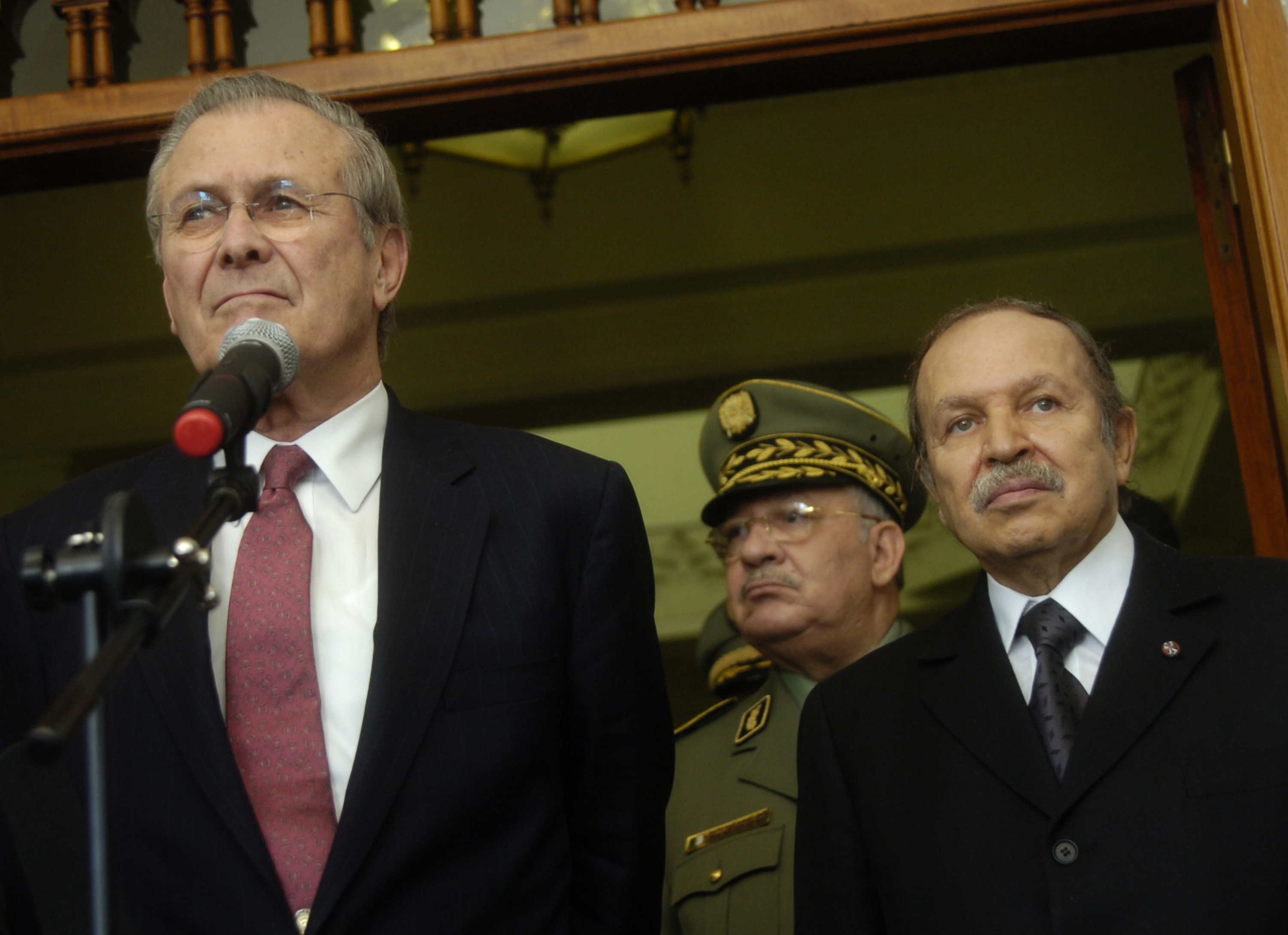

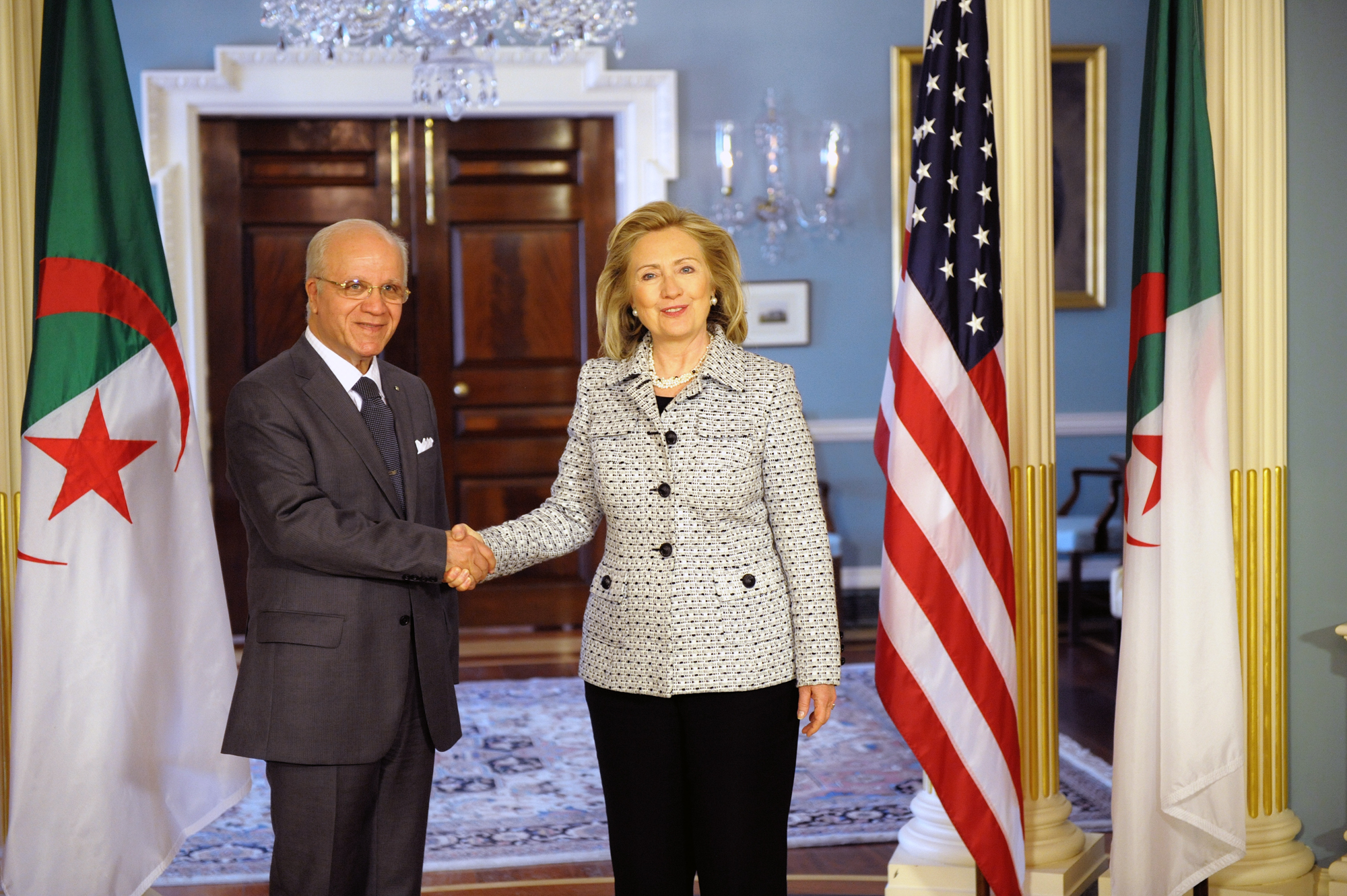

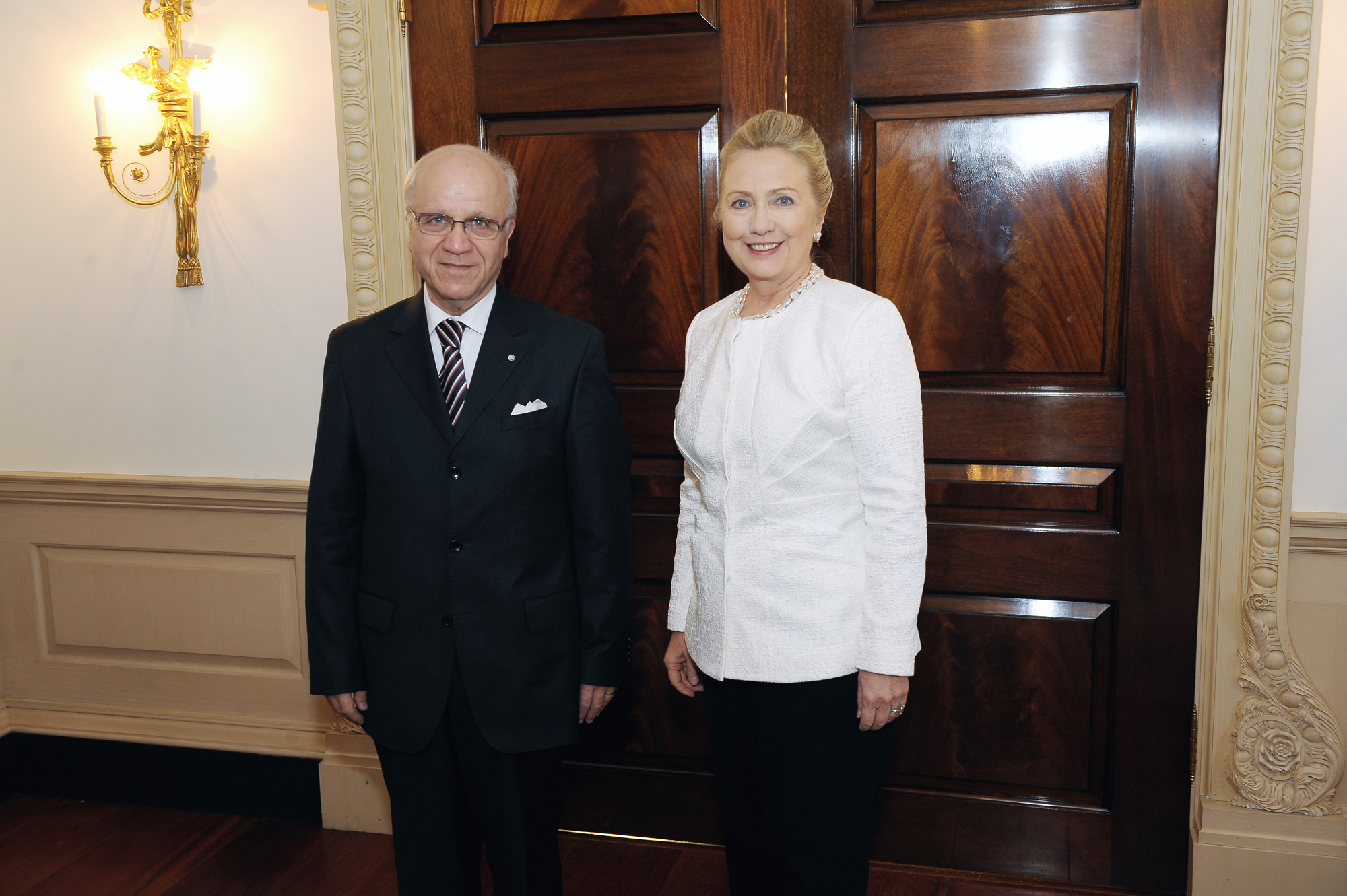

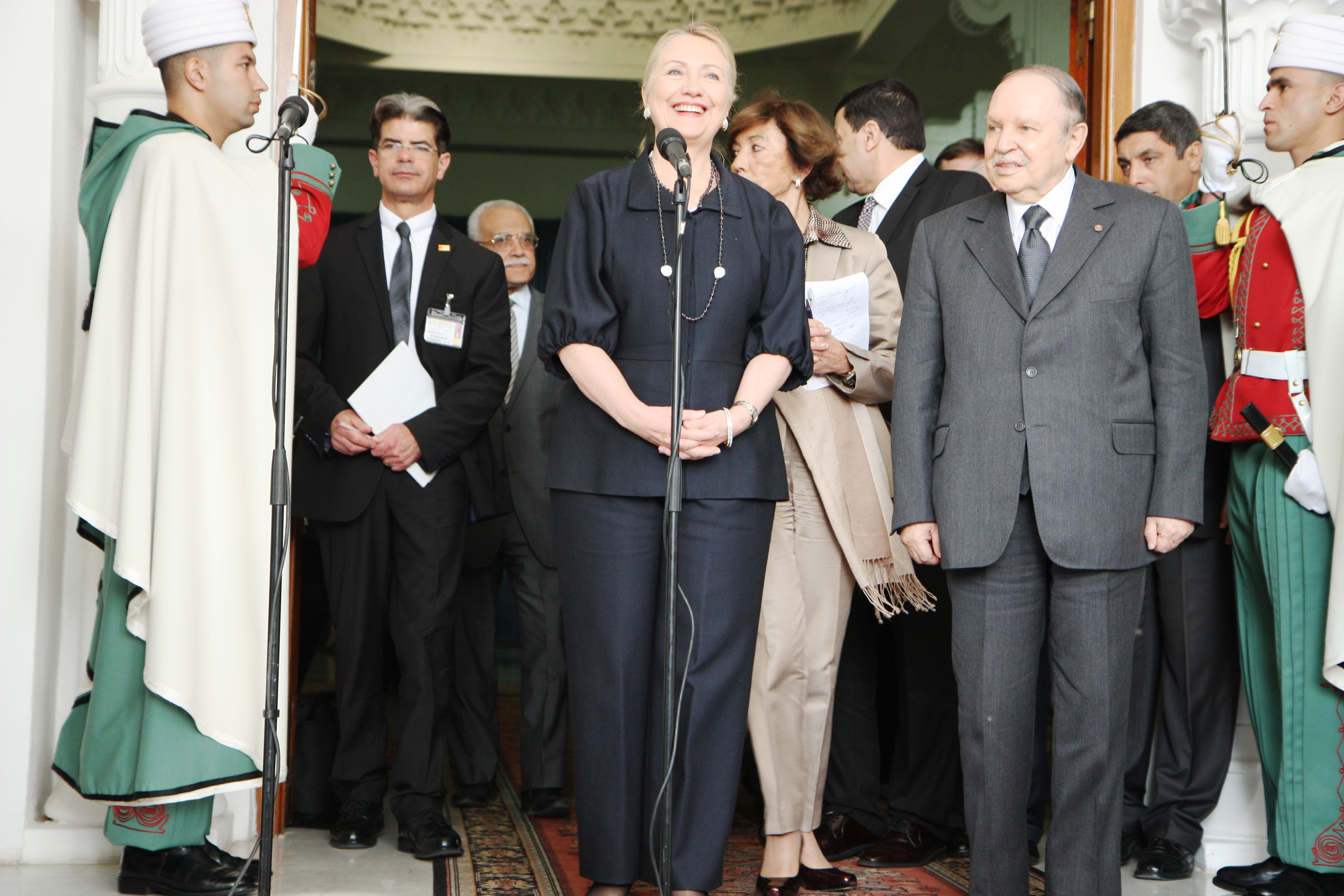

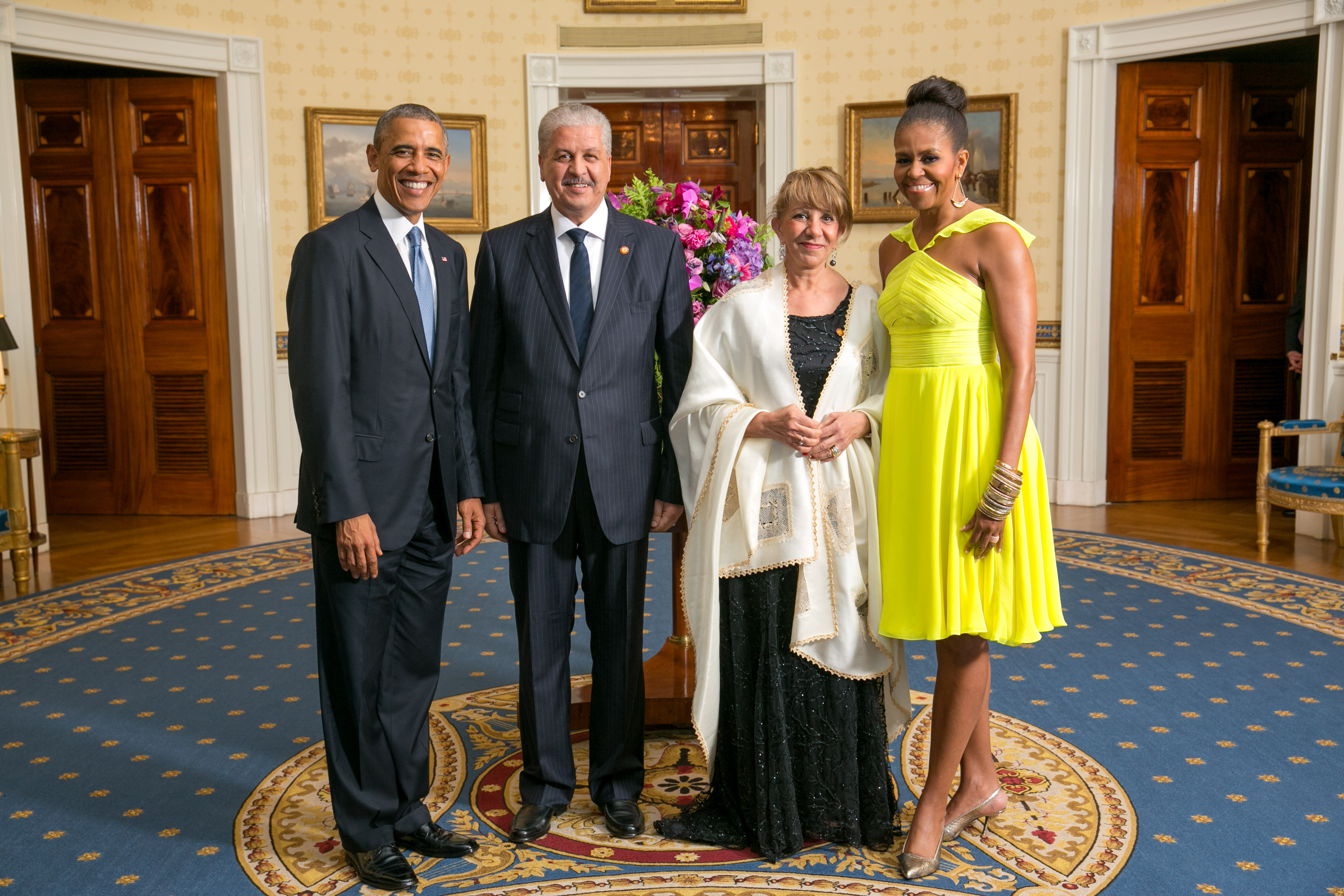

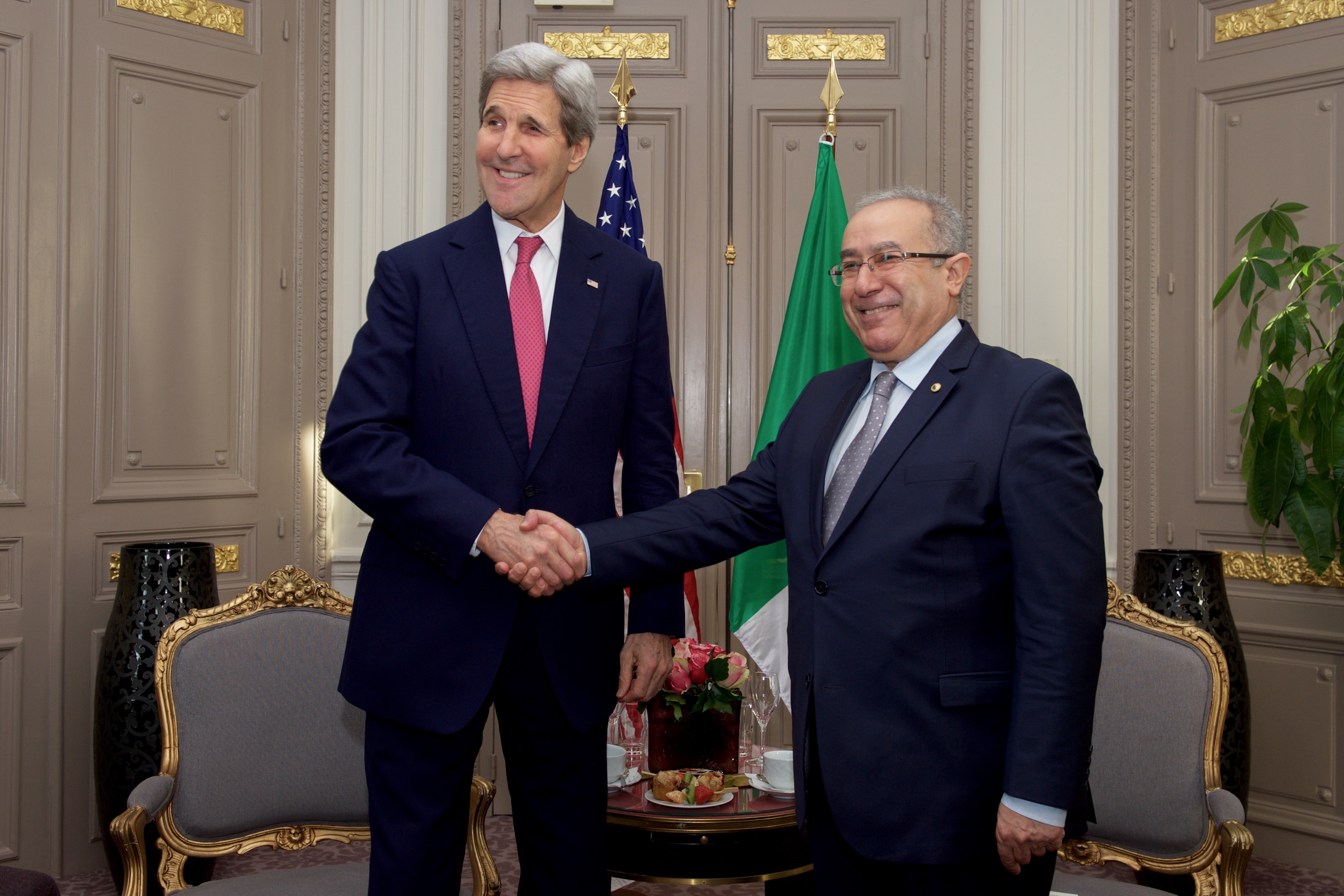

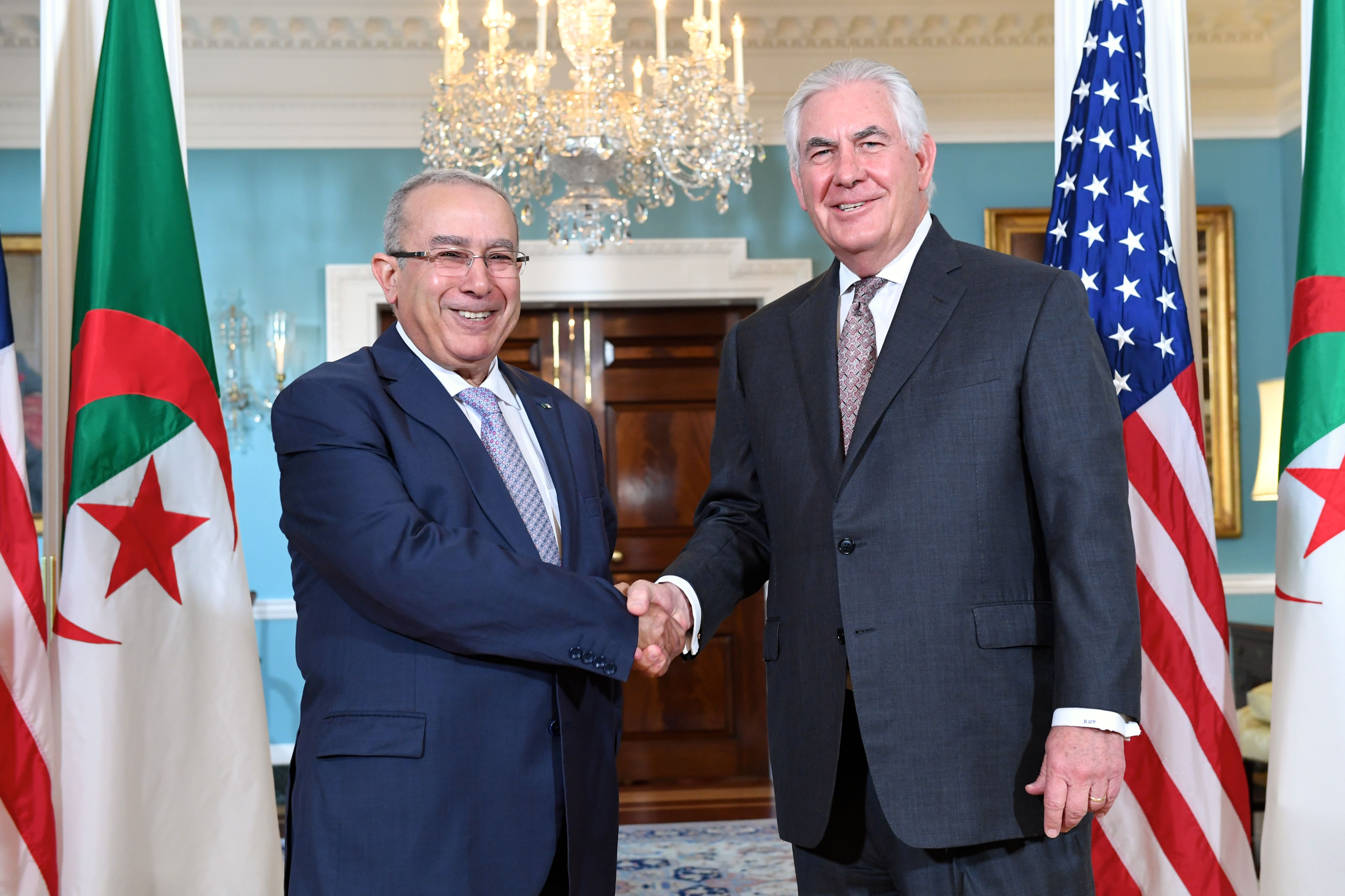

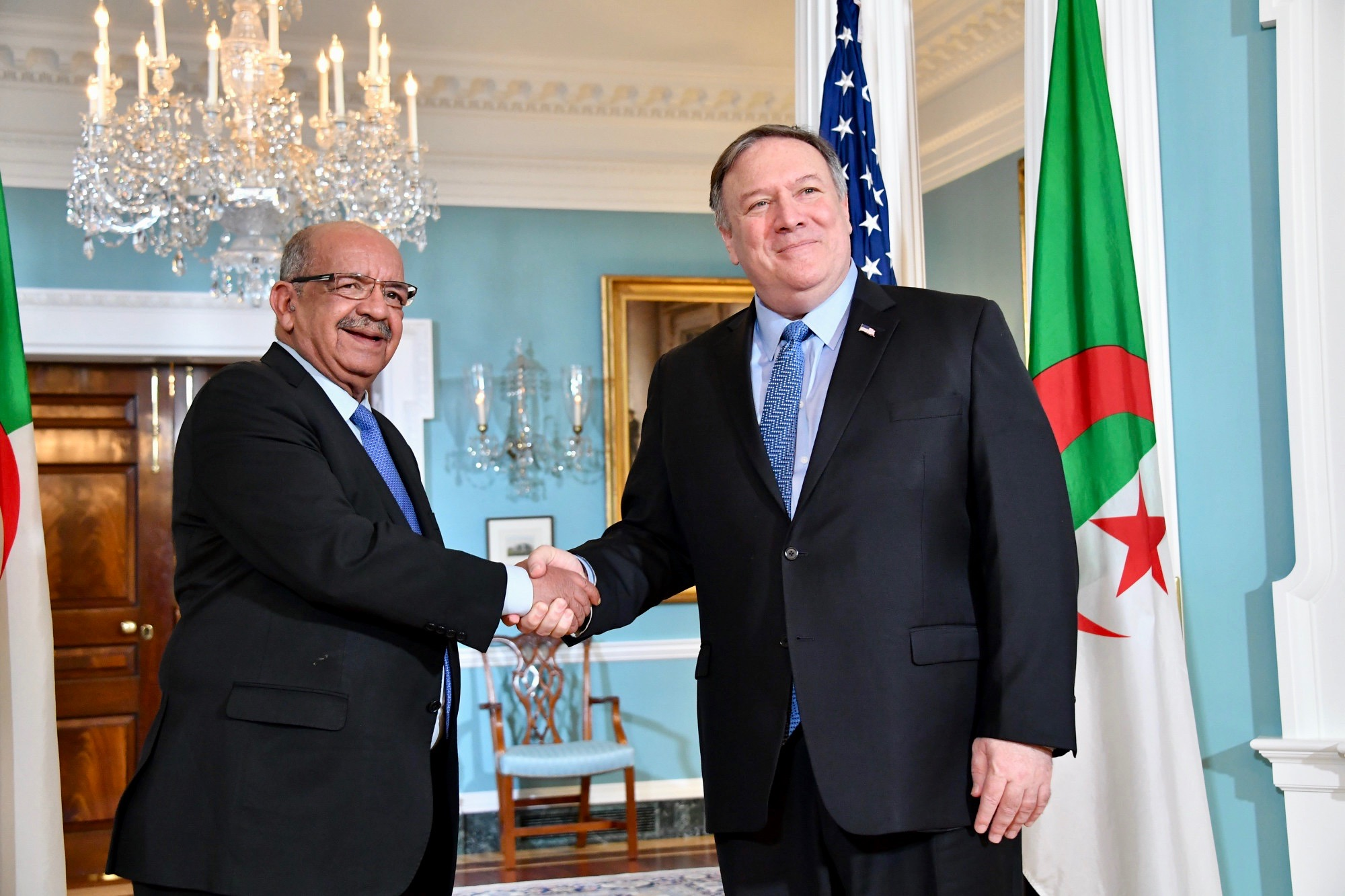

== Angola ==
Table of trips
Dates	Guest	Title	Reason
September 16, 1991	José Eduardo dos Santos	President	Met with President Bush during a private visit.
December 7–9, 1995	José Eduardo dos Santos	President	Official working visit
February 25–26, 2002	José Eduardo dos Santos	President	Working visit
May 11–14, 2004	José Eduardo dos Santos	President	Working visit
September 26, 2018	João Manuel Gonçalves Lourenço	President	Attended the 73rd Session of the United Nations General Assembly.
September 24, 2019	João Manuel Gonçalves Lourenço	President	Attended the 74th Session of the United Nations General Assembly.
November 30, 2022	João Manuel Gonçalves Lourenço	President	Met with President Biden marks the 30th anniversary of the Diplomatic Relations between Angola and the United States.
September 20, 2023	João Manuel Gonçalves Lourenço	President	Attended the 78th Session of the United Nations General Assembly.
November 30, 2023	João Manuel Gonçalves Lourenço	President	Working Visit.

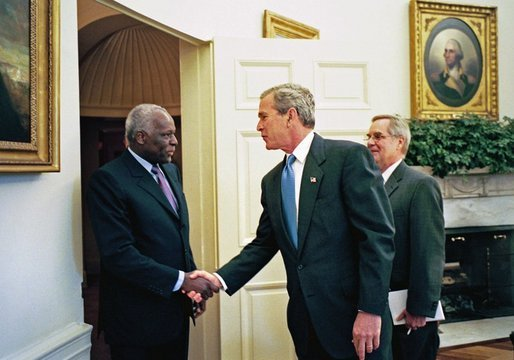

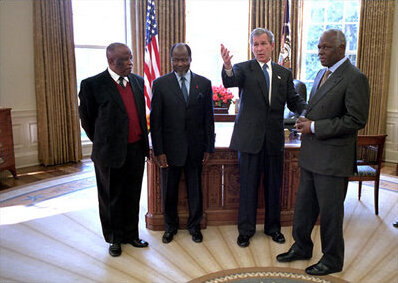

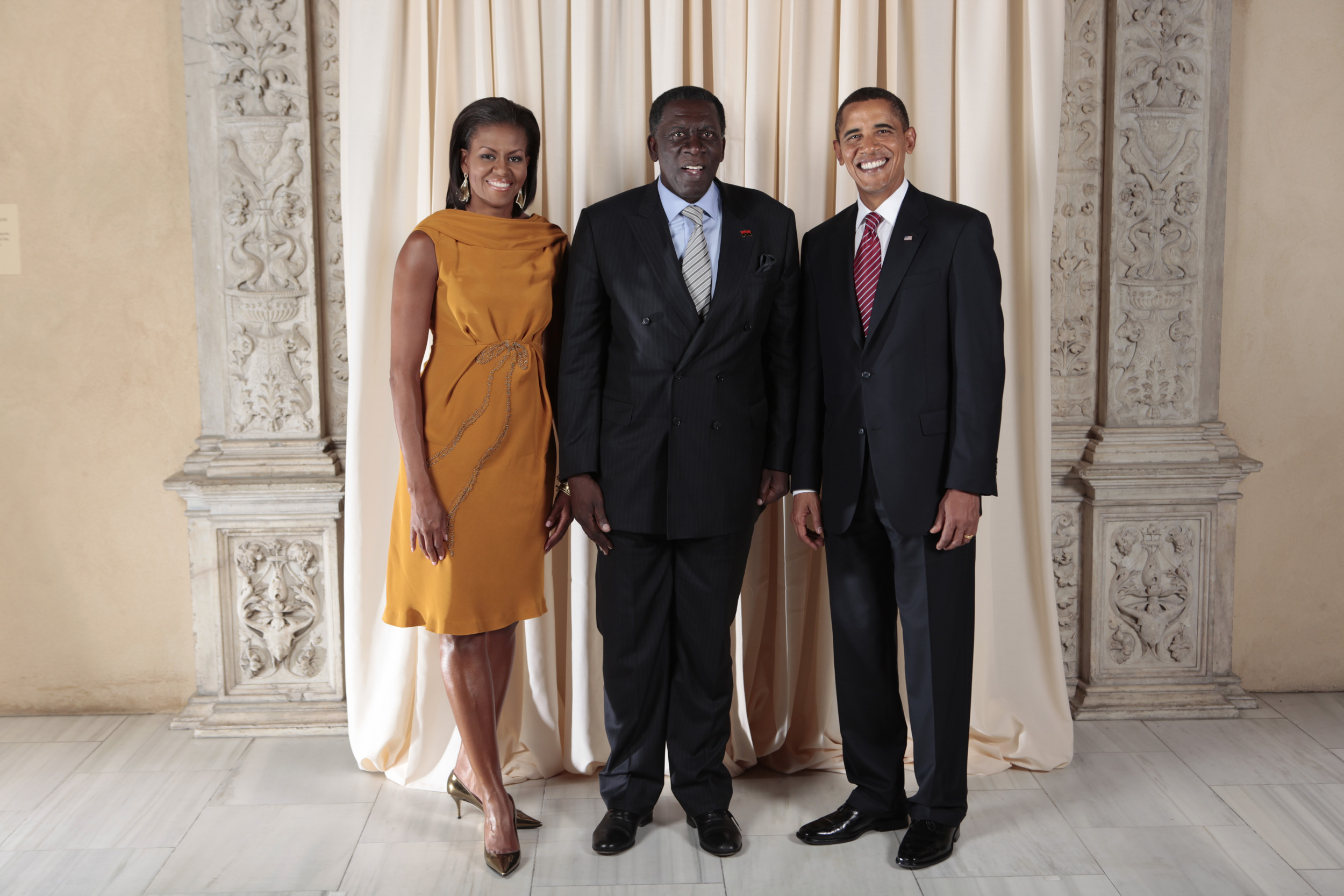

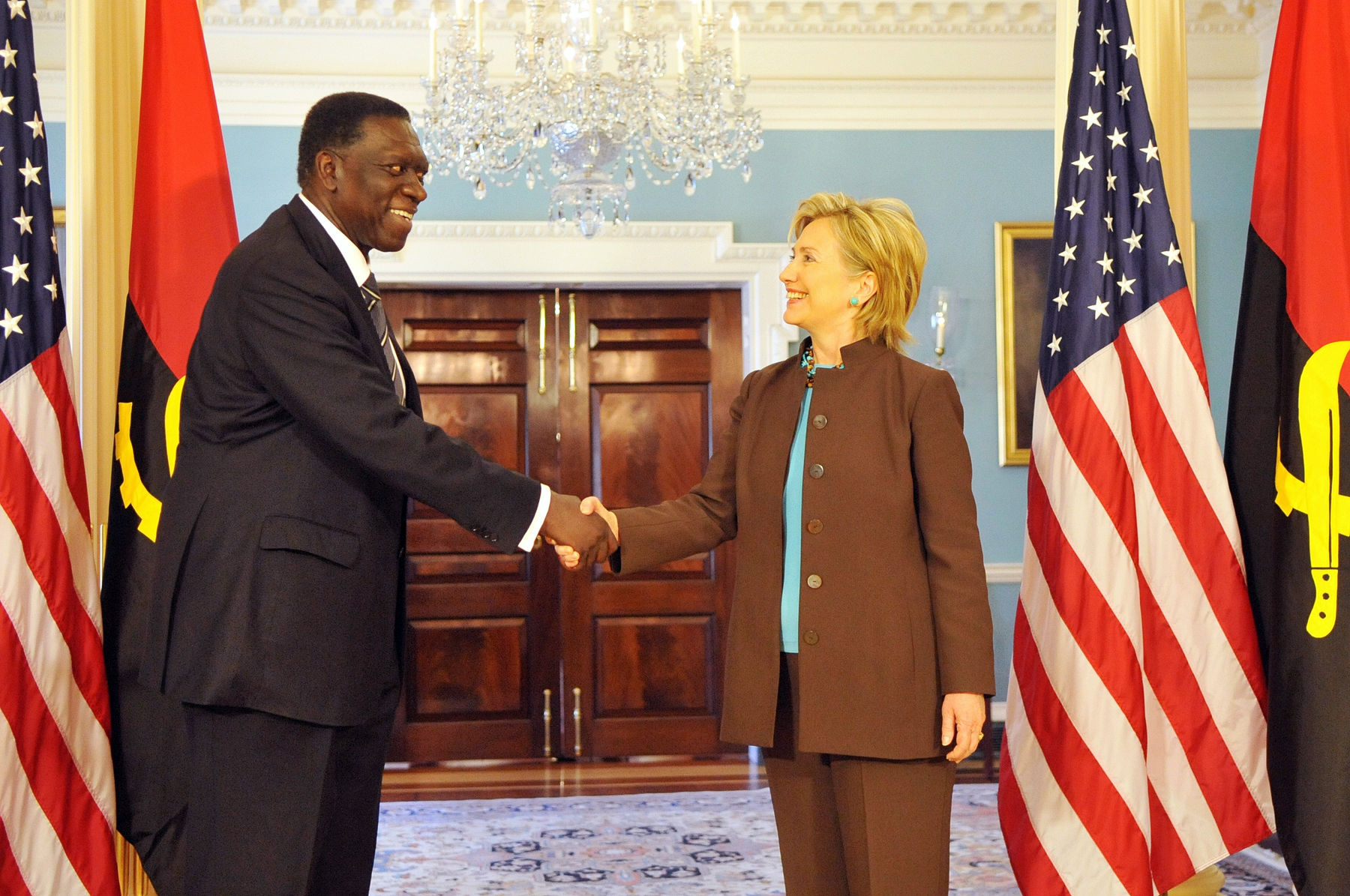

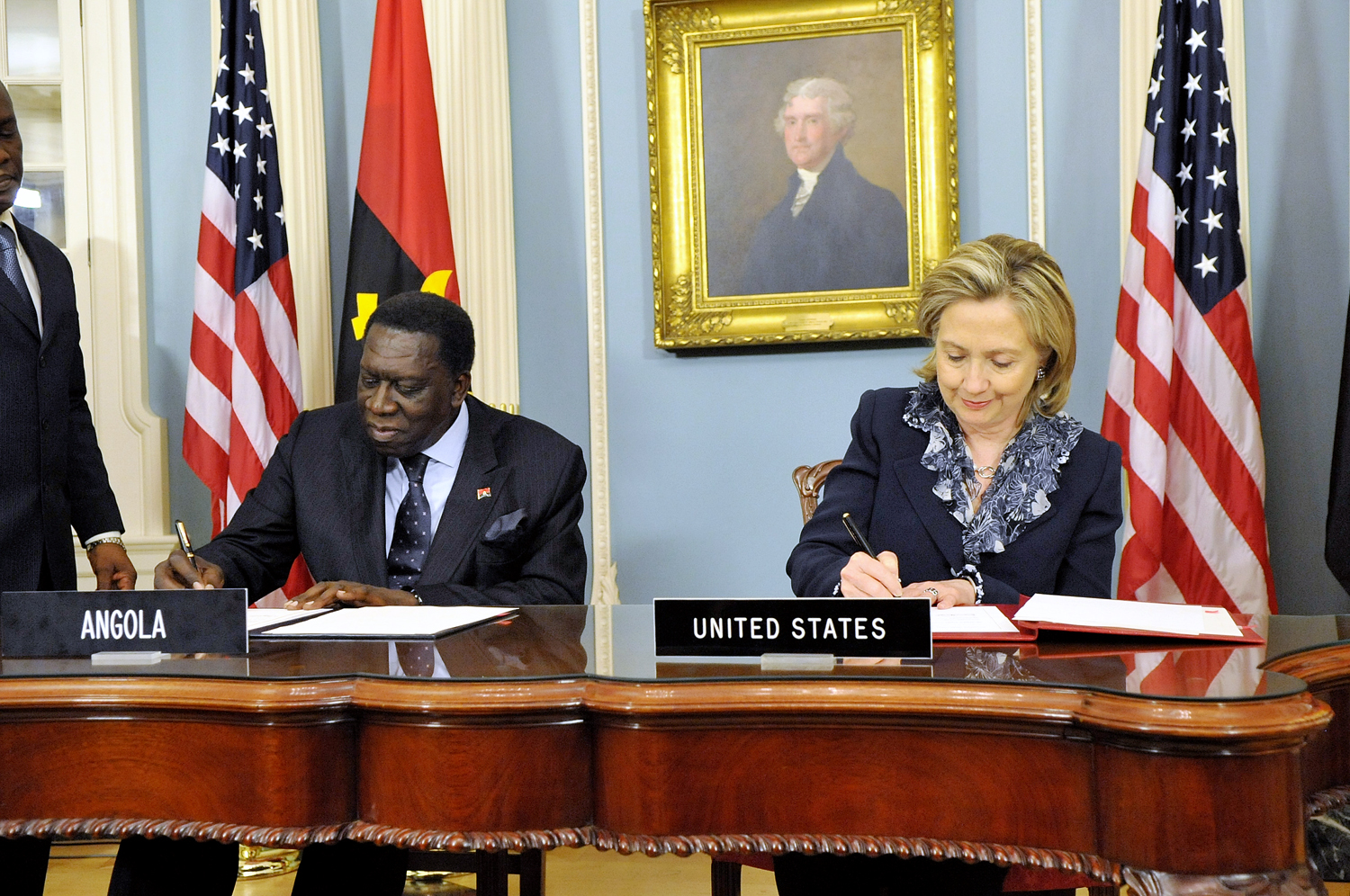

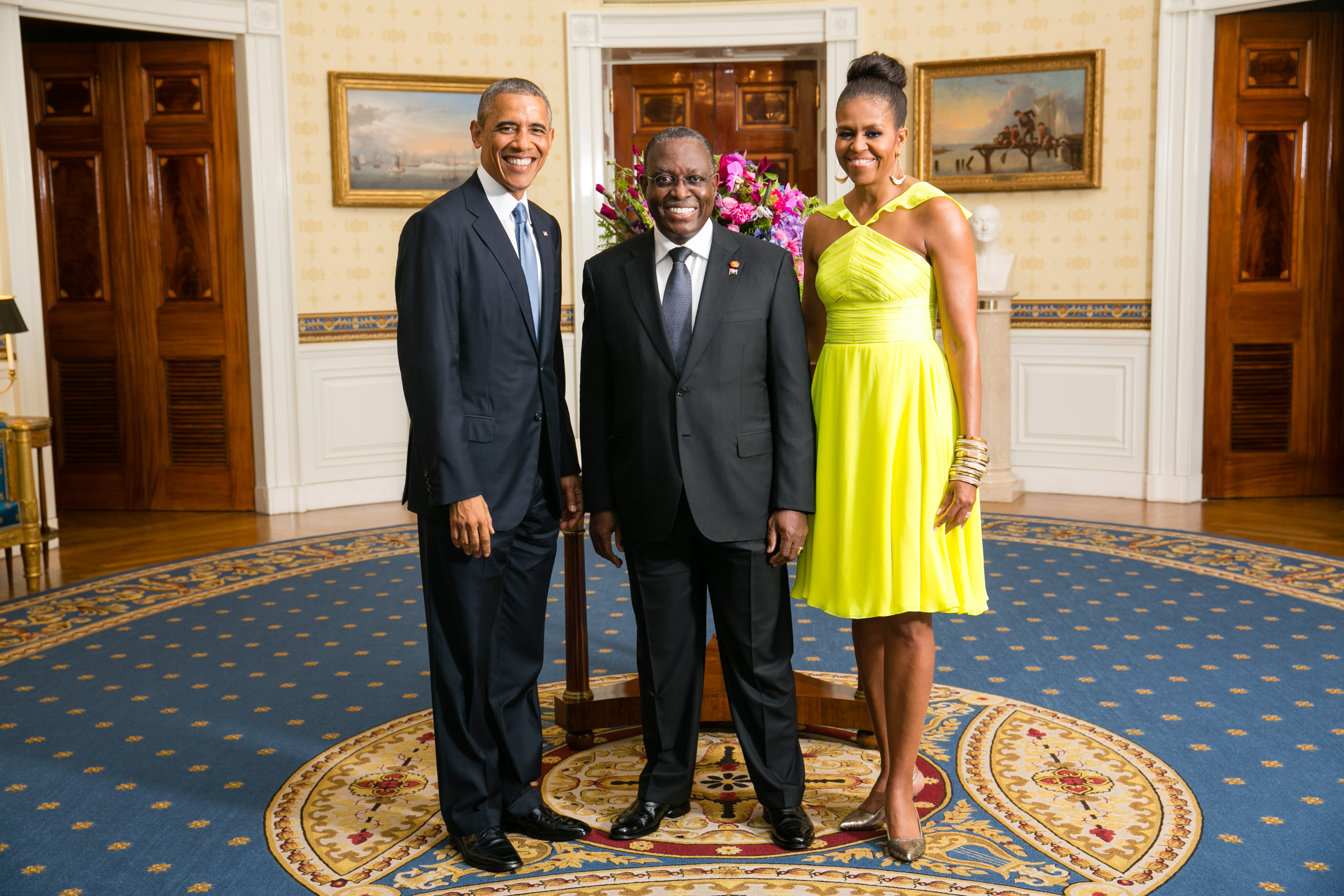

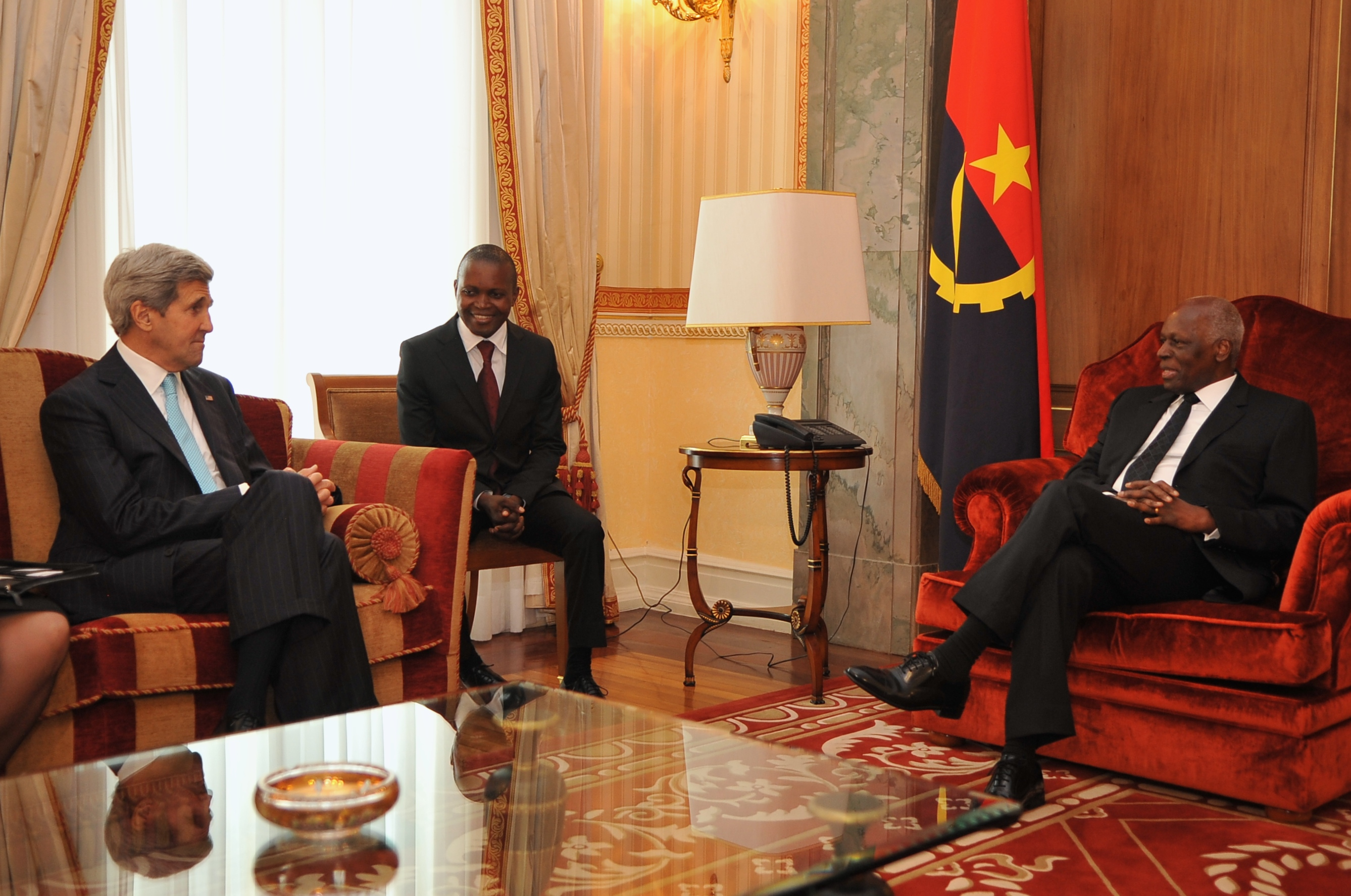

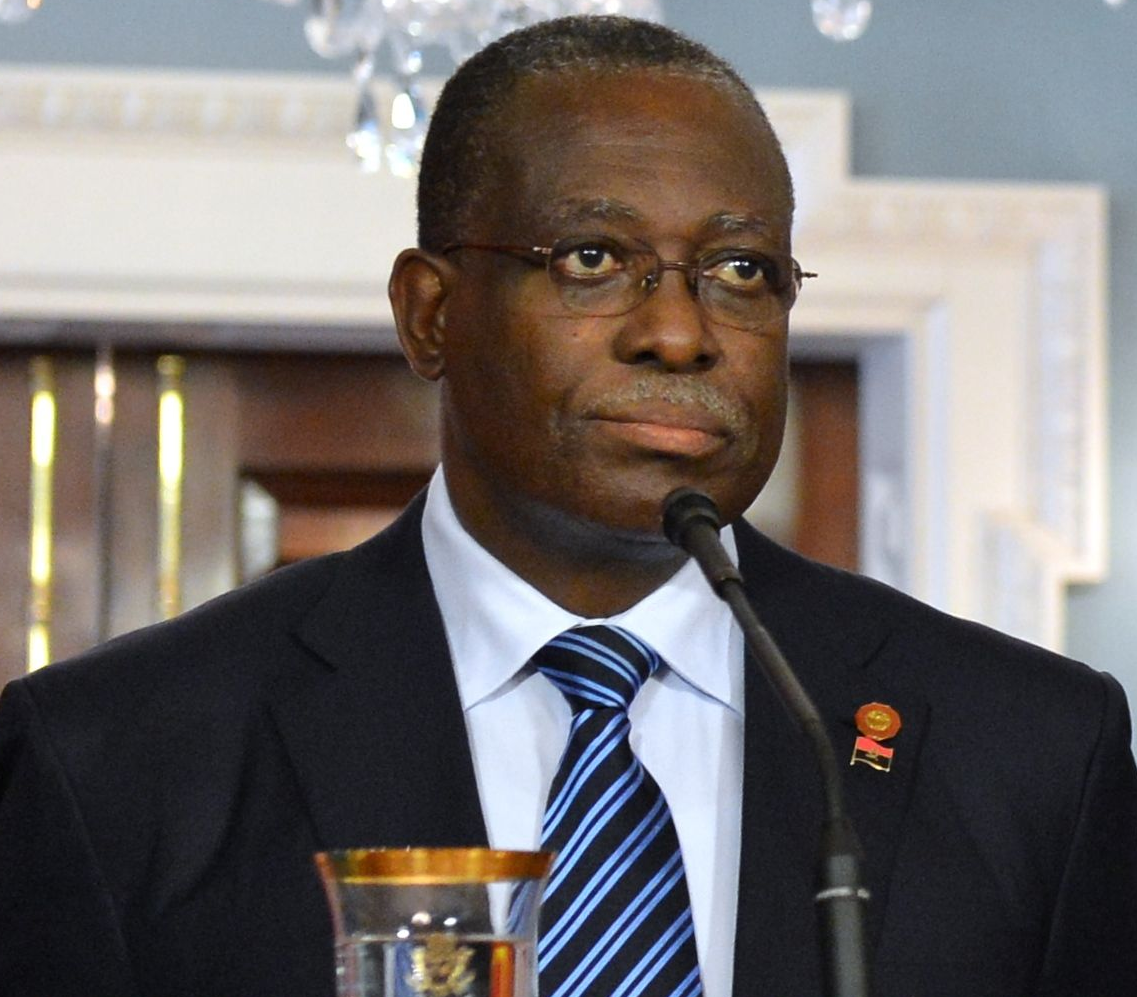

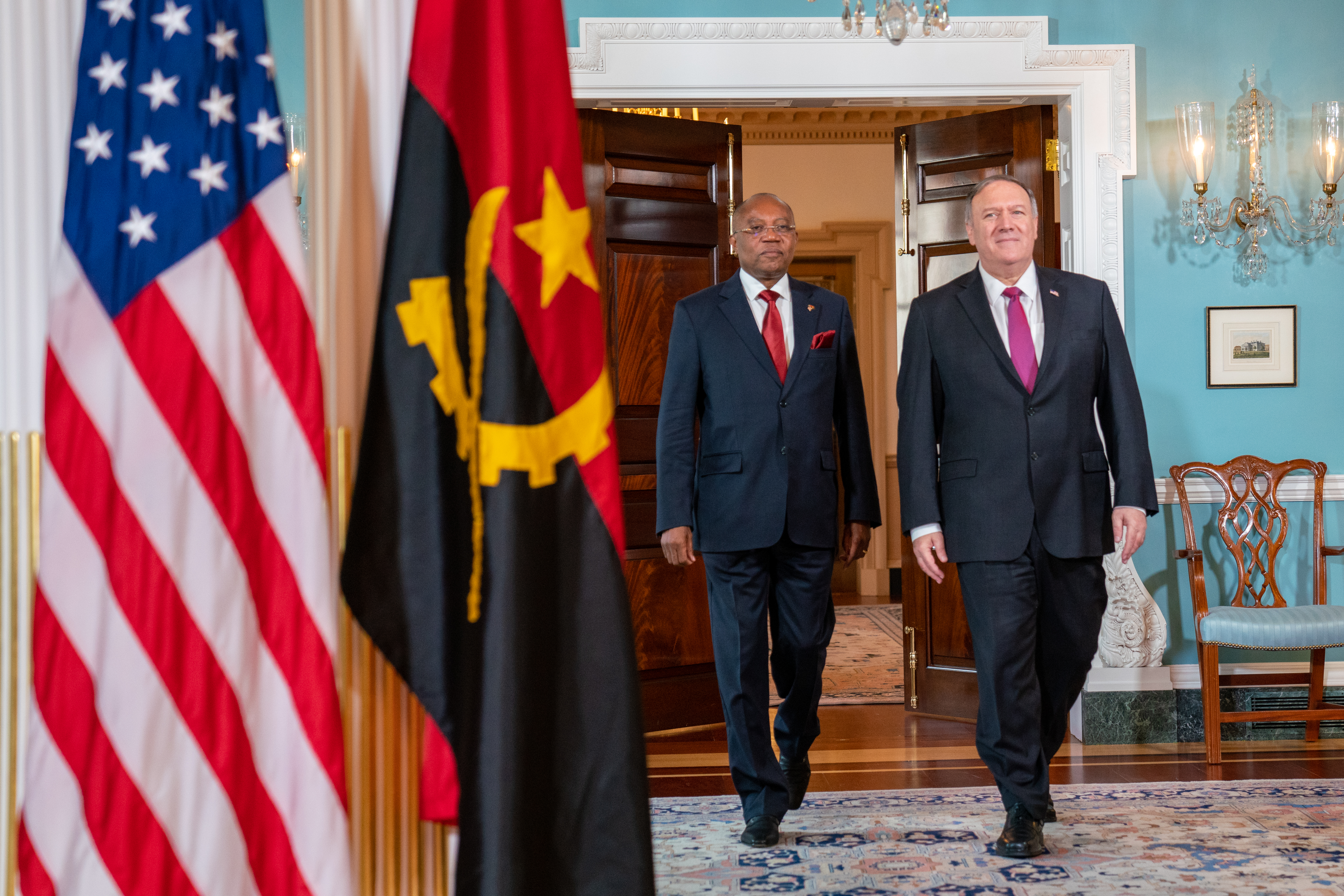

== Benin ==
Table of trips
Dates	Guest	Title	Reason
March 5, 1969	Émile Zinsou	President	Private visit
October 24, 1970	Hubert Maga	Chairman	Attended dinner celebrating the 25th anniversary of the United Nations at the White House.
December 9, 1971	Hubert Maga	Chairman	Private visit
November 4–6, 1991	Nicephore Soglo	President	Official visit
July 12–15, 1995	Nicephore Soglo	President	Official working visit
December 11–14, 2006	Thomas Boni Yayi	President	Working visit. Attended a summit at the White House addressing malaria.
September 28, 2008	Thomas Boni Yayi	President	Attended the 63rd Session of the United Nations General Assembly.
July 29, 2011	Thomas Boni Yayi	President	Working visit. Attended a summit at the White House addressing democratic progresses in West Africa with U.S. President Barack Obama, Guinean President Alpha Condé, Ivoirian President Alassane Ouattara and Nigerien President Mahamadou Issoufou.
August 4–6, 2014	Thomas Boni Yayi	President	Attended the United States–Africa Leaders Summit.
September 30, 2015	Lionel Zinsou	Prime Minister	Attended the 70th Session of the United Nations General Assembly.
September 22, 2016	Patrice Talon	President	Attended the 71st Session of the United Nations General Assembly.
January 26–30, 2020	Patrice Talon	President	Working visit, meet U.S. Secretary of State Mike Pompeo.
December 13–15, 2022	Patrice Talon	President	Attended the United States-Africa Leaders Summit 2022.

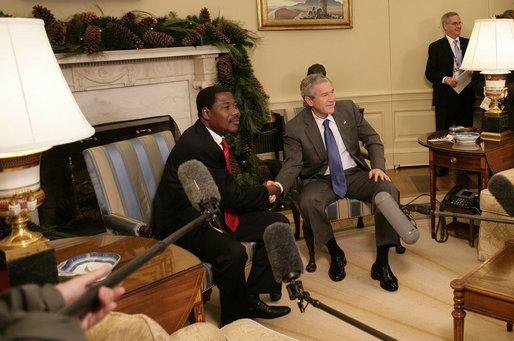

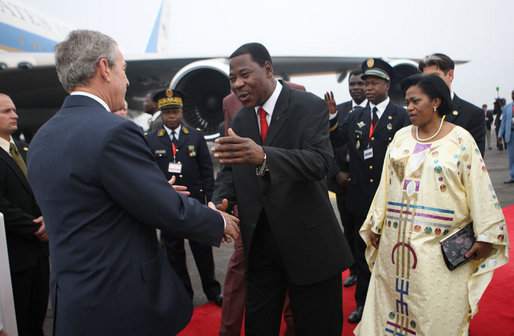

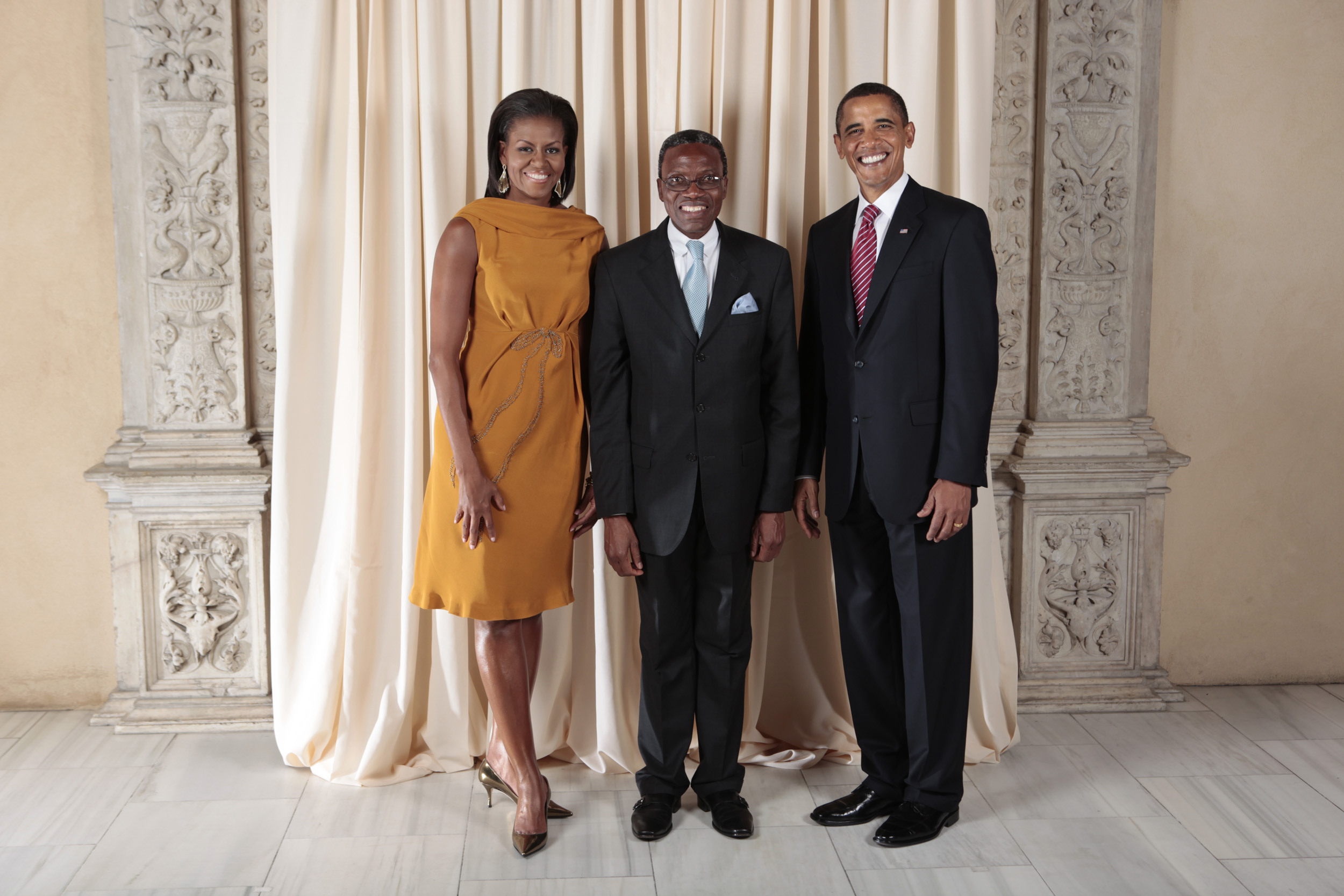

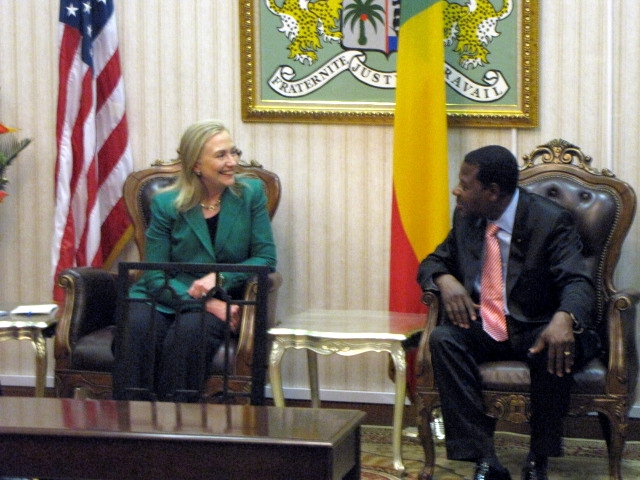

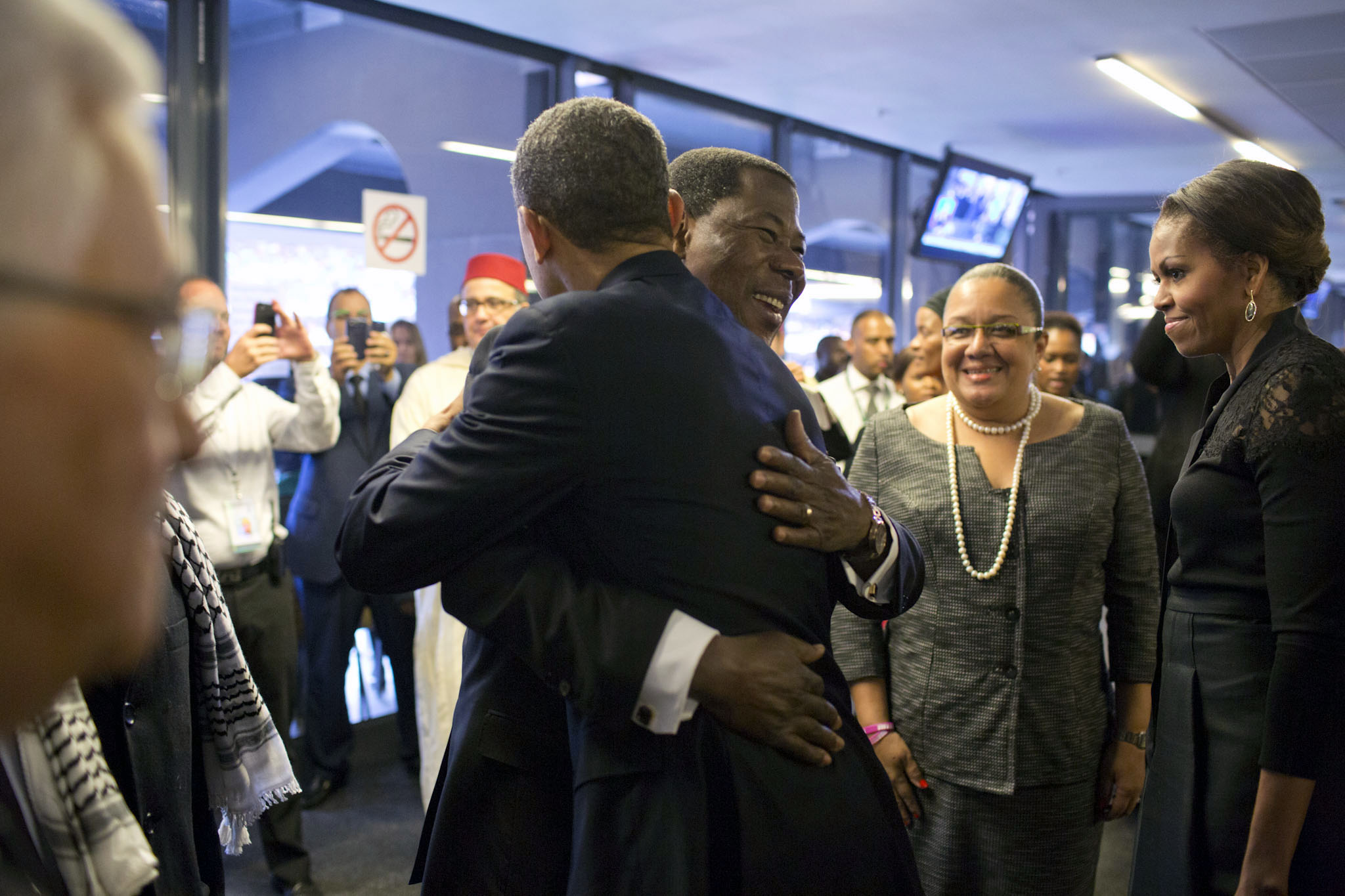

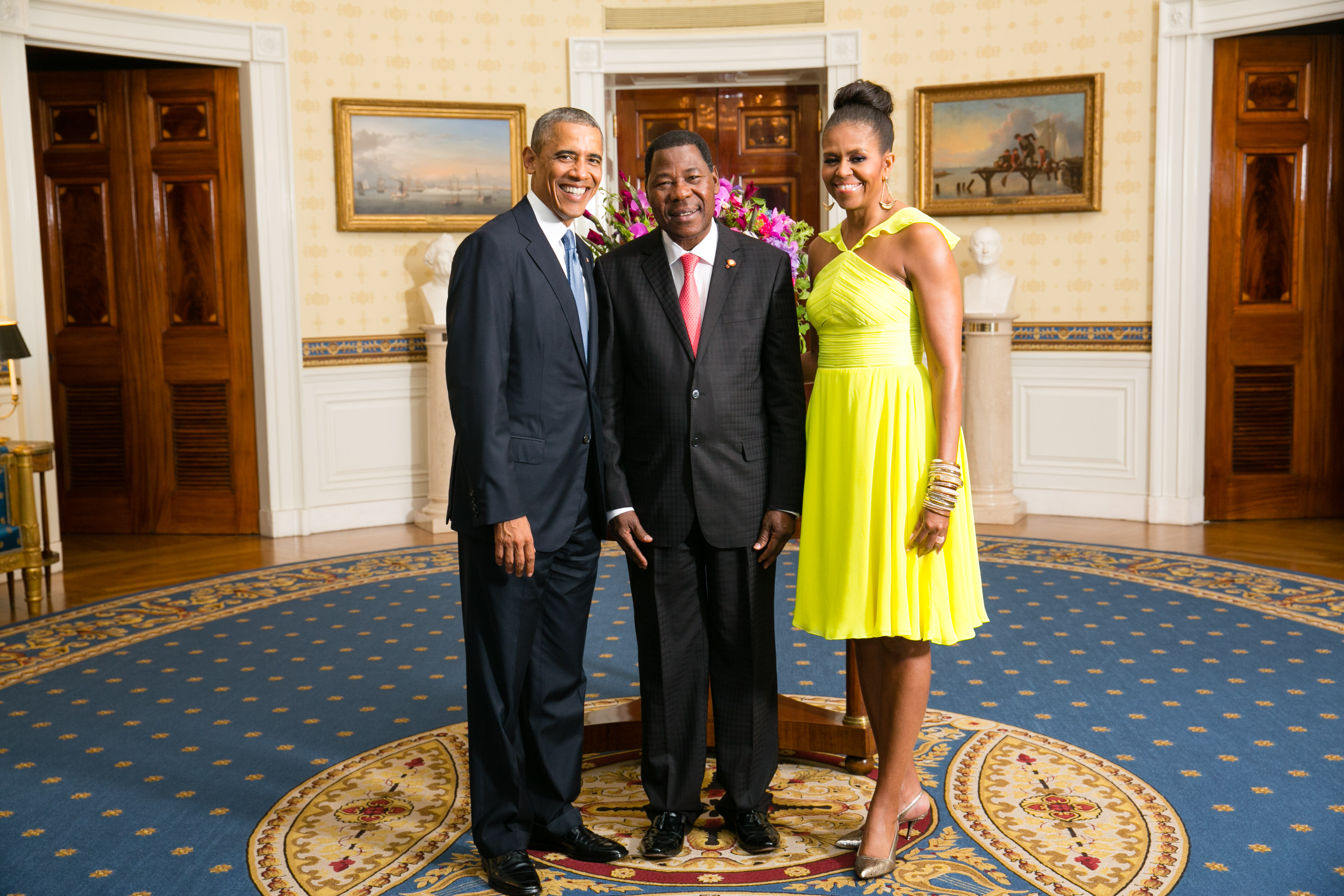

== Botswana ==
Table of trips
Dates	Guest	Title	Reason
March 31 – April 1, 1969	Seretse Khama	President	Consultations with IBRD; attended Eisenhower funeral; met with President Nixon March 31.
June 9, 1976	Seretse Khama	President	Private visit.
May 7–10, 1984	Quett Masire	President	Official working visit. Private visit to New York City afterwards.
June 7, 1989	Quett Masire	President	Met with President Bush during a private visit.
October 19, 1995	Quett Masire	President	Attended Africare dinner with President Clinton.
February 25–26, 2002	Festus Mogae	President	Working visit.
June 12–13, 2005	Festus Mogae	President	Working visit. Discussed African Growth and Opportunity Act.
November 5, 2009	Ian Khama	President	Working Visit.
September 19–27, 2018	Mokgweetsi Masisi	President	Attended the 73rd Session of the United Nations General Assembly and visited the Florida State University, his alma mater.
May 28-June 7, 2019	Mokgweetsi Masisi	President	Working visit.
September 22, 2022	Mokgweetsi Masisi	President	Attended the 77th Session of the United Nations General Assembly.
December 13–15, 2022	Mokgweetsi Masisi	President	Attended United States-Africa Leaders Summit 2022.
September 20, 2023	Mokgweetsi Masisi	President	Attended the 78th Session of the United Nations General Assembly.
April 28 - May 9, 2024	Mokgweetsi Masisi	President	Working Visit.

== Burkina Faso ==
Table of trips
Dates	Guest	Title	Reason
March 28 – April 7, 1965	Maurice Yaméogo	President	State visit. Also visited Williamsburg, Los Angeles, Fresno, San Francisco, Springfield, and New York City.
October 24, 1970	Sangoule Lamizana	President	Attended dinner on the 25th anniversary of the United Nations at the White House.
October 15, 1973	Sangoule Lamizana	President	Private visit; met with President Nixon at the White House to discuss the drought in West Africa.
July 13–16, 2008	Blaise Compaoré	President	Working visit
September 24, 2008	Blaise Compaoré	President	Attended the 63rd Session of the United Nations General Assembly.
September 25, 2009	Blaise Compaoré	President	Attended the 64th Session of the United Nations General Assembly.
September 25, 2013	Blaise Compaoré	President	Attended the 68th Session of the United Nations General Assembly.
August 4–6, 2014	Blaise Compaoré	President	Attended the United States–Africa Leaders Summit.
October 2, 2015	Michel Kafando	President of the Transitional Council	Attended the 70th Session of the United Nations General Assembly.
September 22, 2016	Roch Marc Christian Kaboré	President	Attended the 71st Session of the United Nations General Assembly.
September 21, 2017	Roch Marc Christian Kaboré	President	Attended the 72nd Session of the United Nations General Assembly.
September 24, 2019	Roch Marc Christian Kaboré	President	Attended the 74th Session of the United Nations General Assembly.

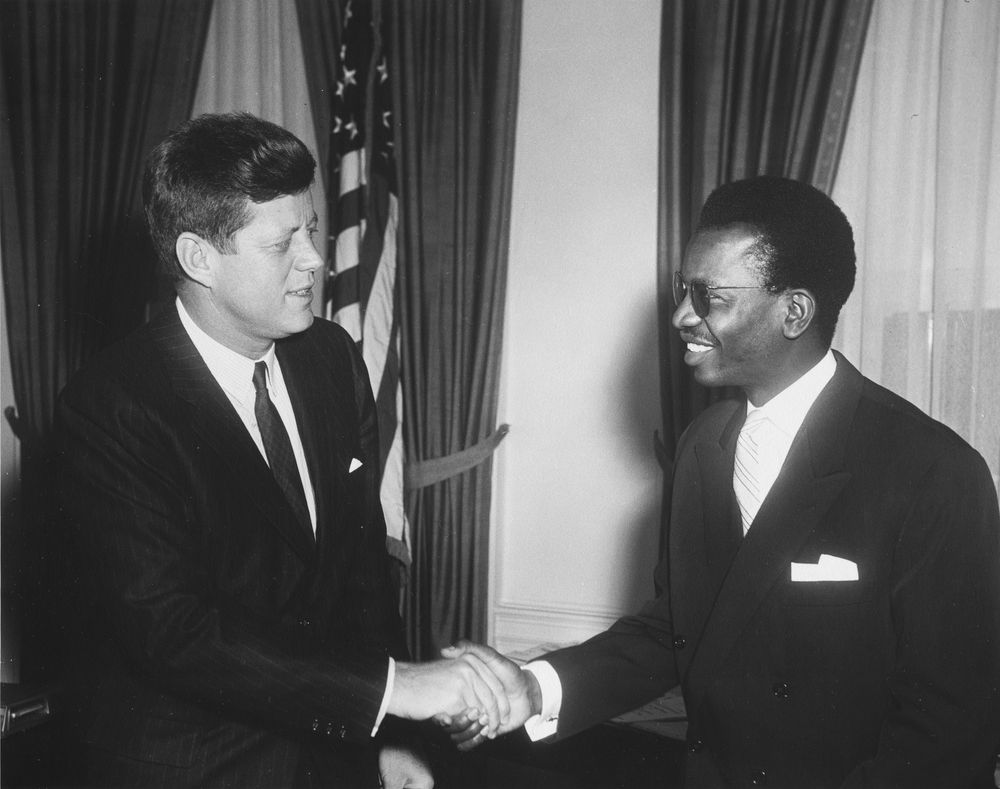

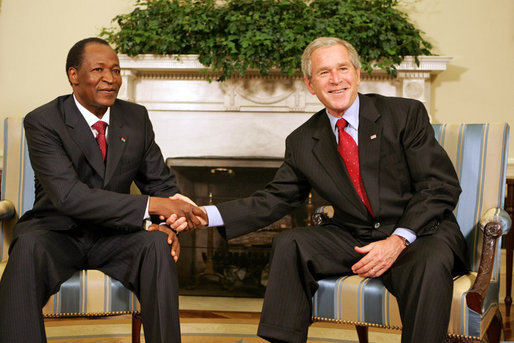

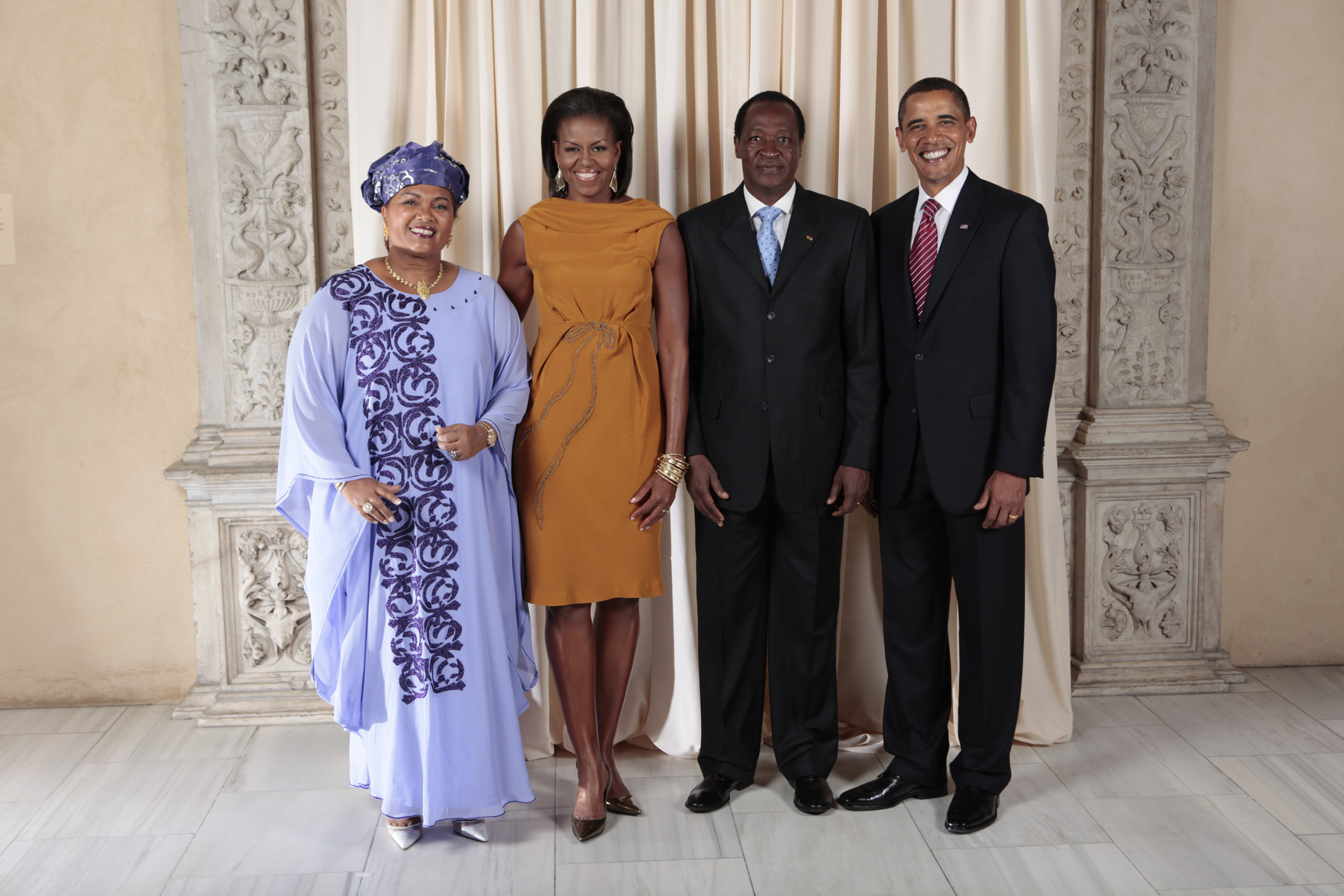

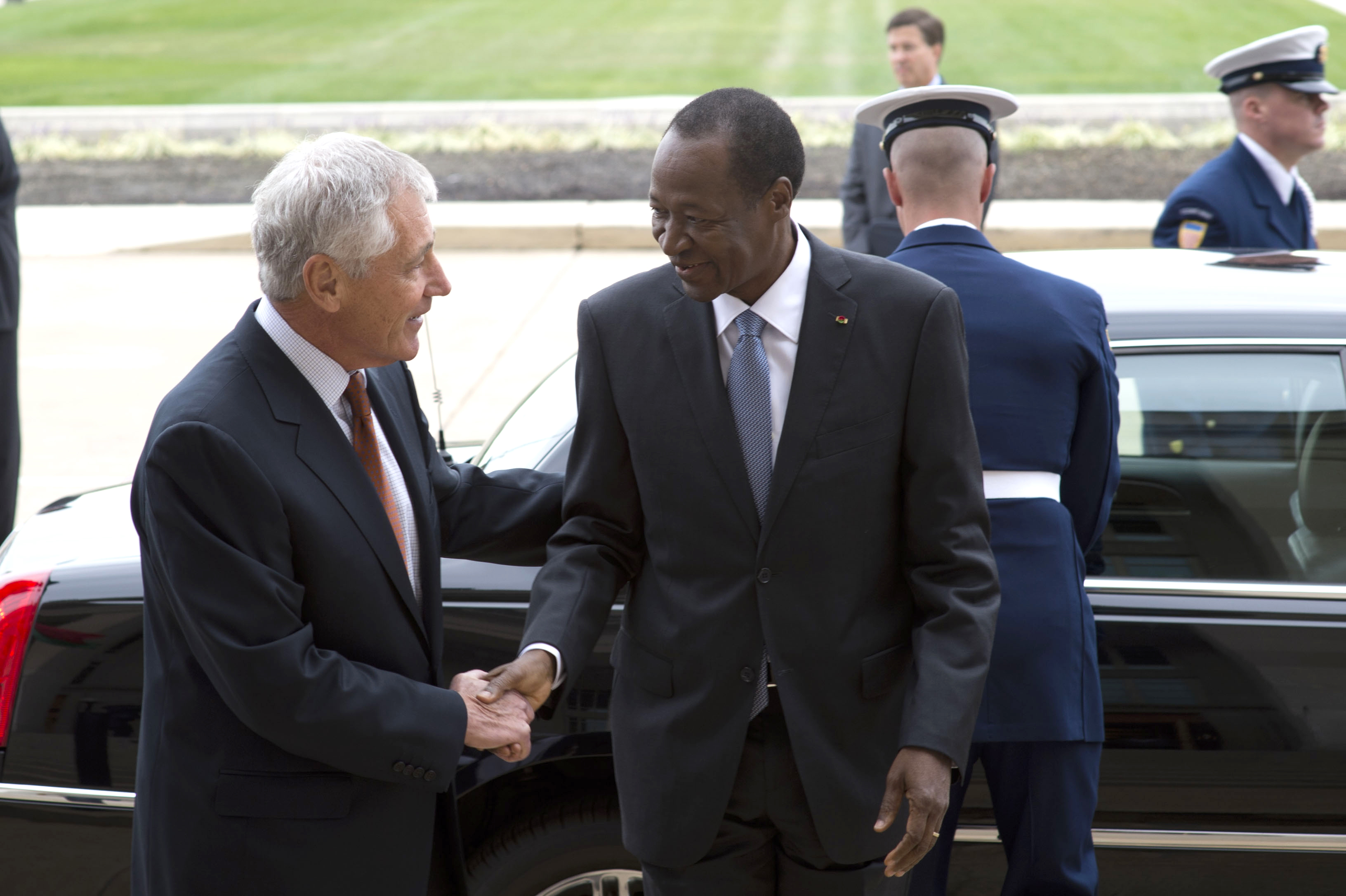

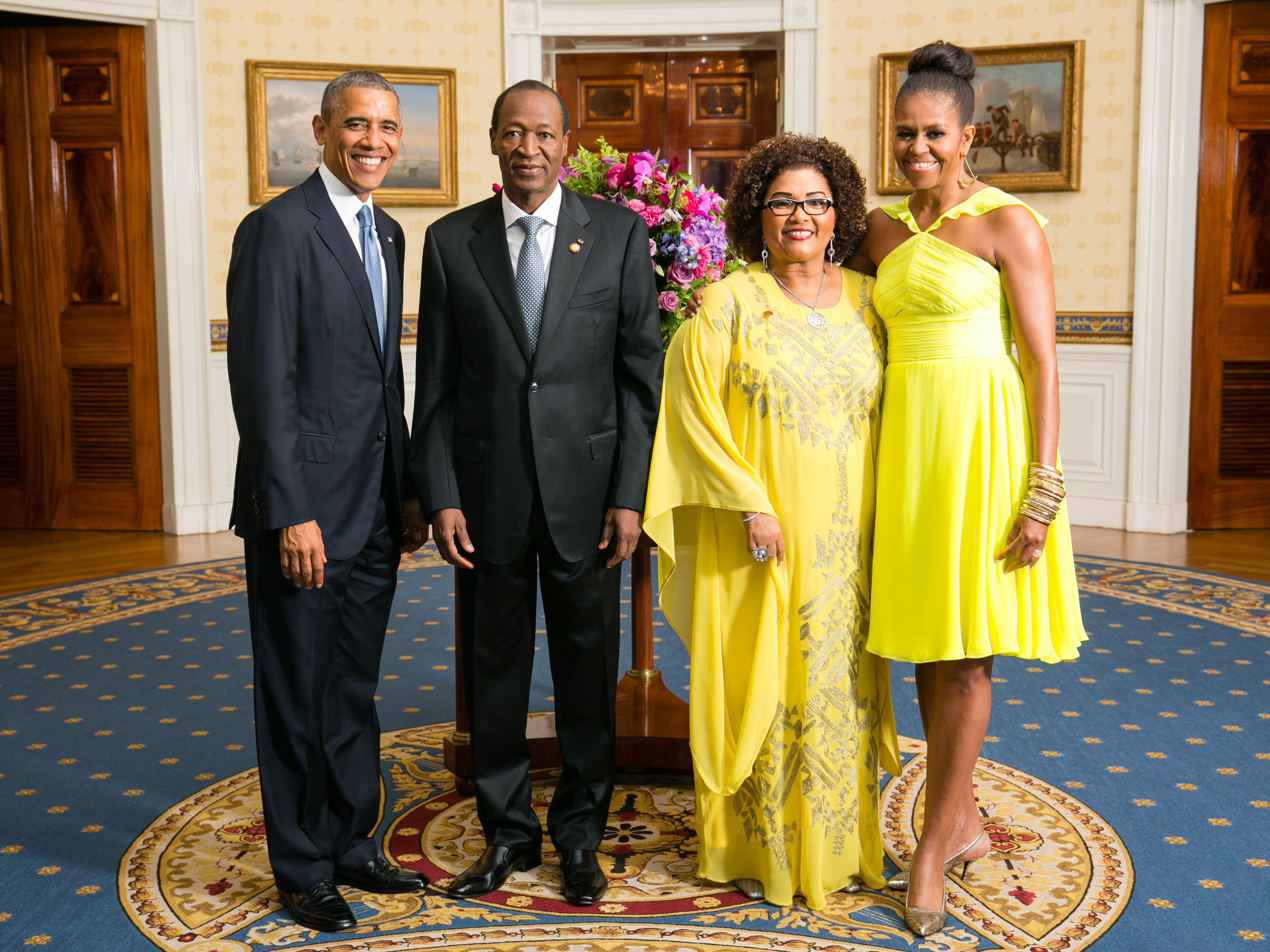

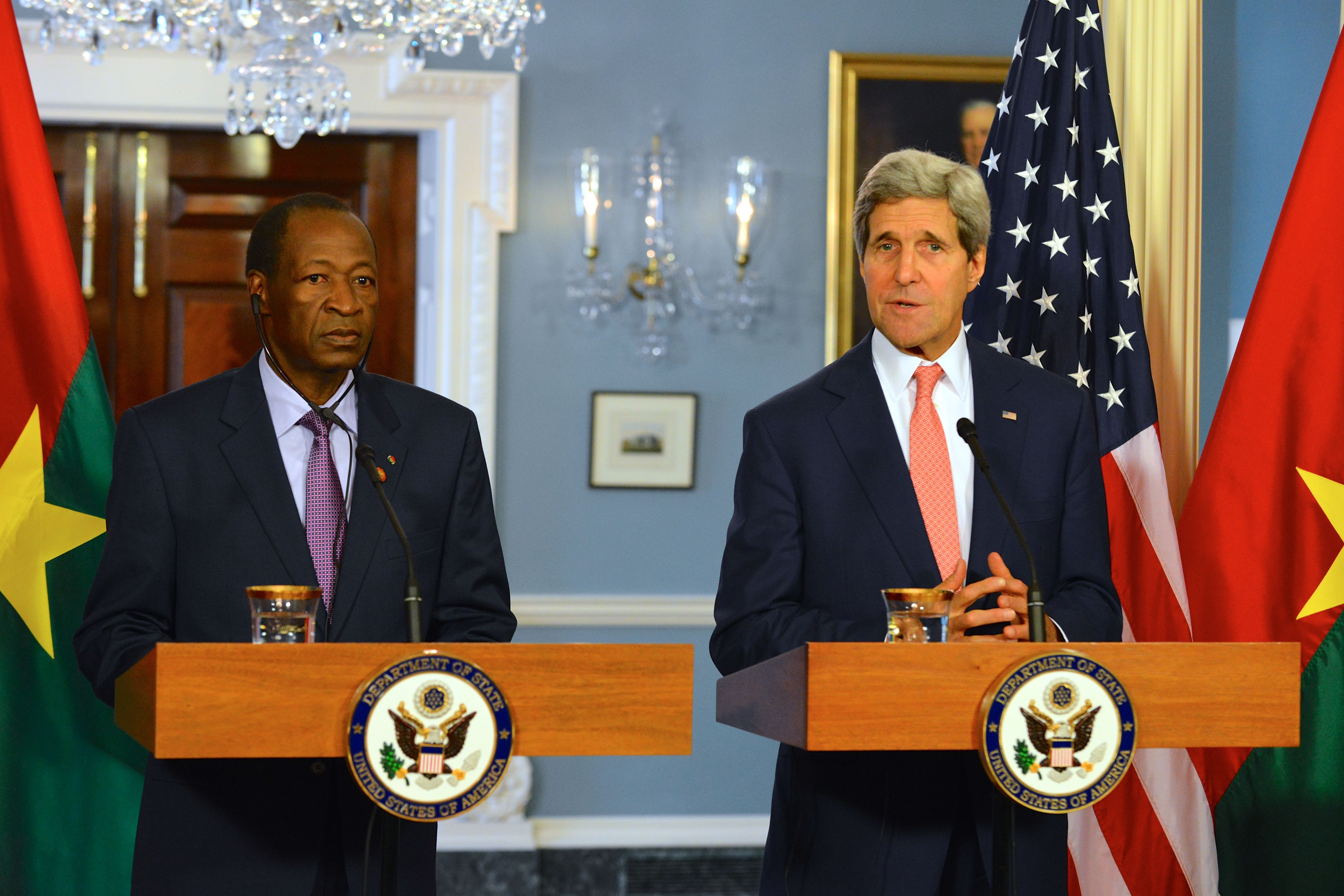

== Burundi ==
Table of trips
Dates	Guest	Title	Reason
May 17–28, 1964	Mwambutsa IV	King	Private visit; dedicated African Pavilion at the New York World's Fair.
September 23–25, 1998	Pierre Buyoya	President	Met with President Clinton during a private visit after the meeting of the United Nations General Assembly.
August 4–6, 2014	Pierre Nkurunziza	President	Attended the United States–Africa Leaders Summit. Met with Secretary of State John Kerry.
September 22, 2022	Évariste Ndayishimiye	President	Attended the 77th Session of the United Nations General Assembly.
December 13–15, 2022	Évariste Ndayishimiye	President	Attended the U.S.-Africa Leaders Summit 2022.
September 21, 2023	Évariste Ndayishimiye	President	Attended the 78th Session of the United Nations General Assembly.

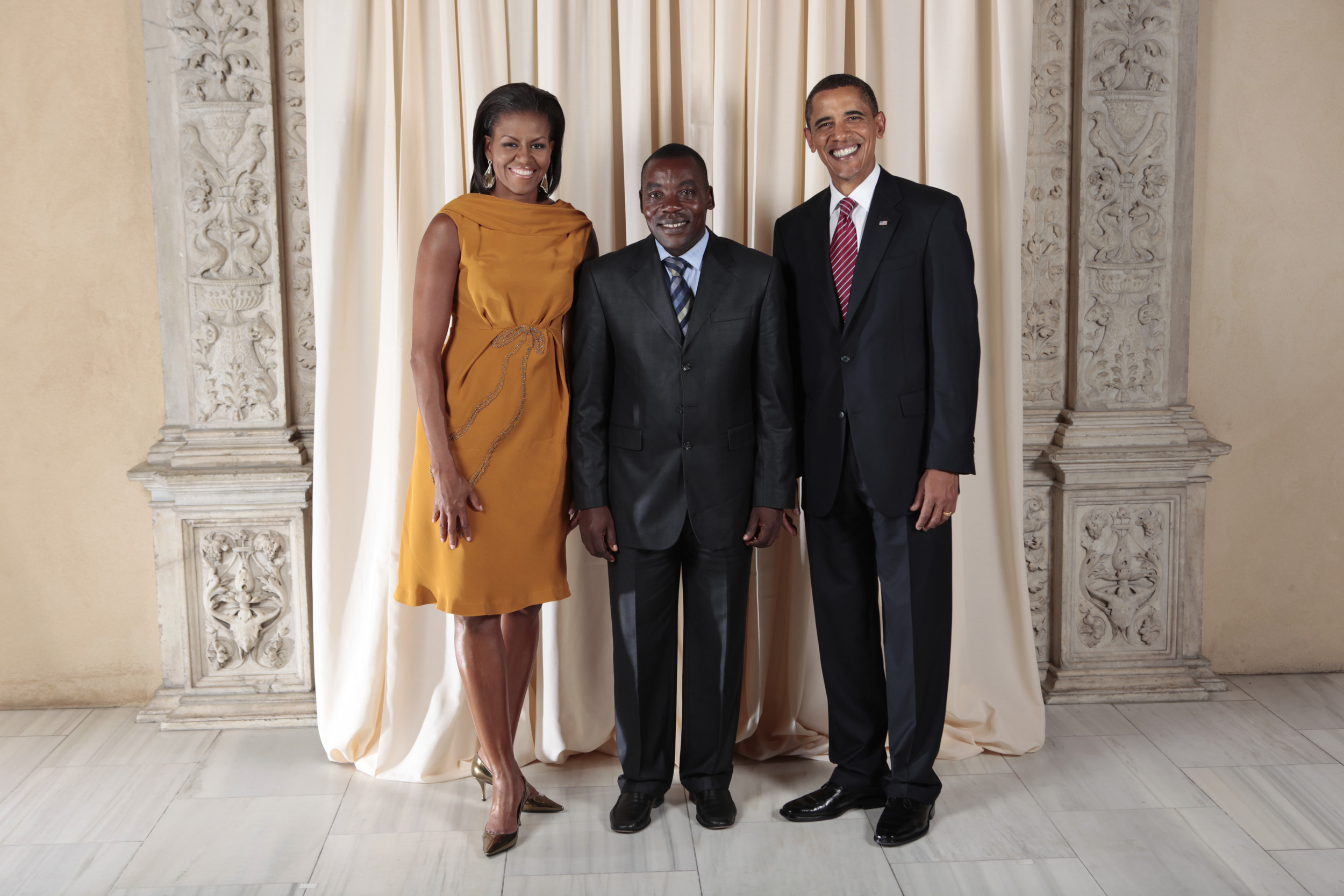

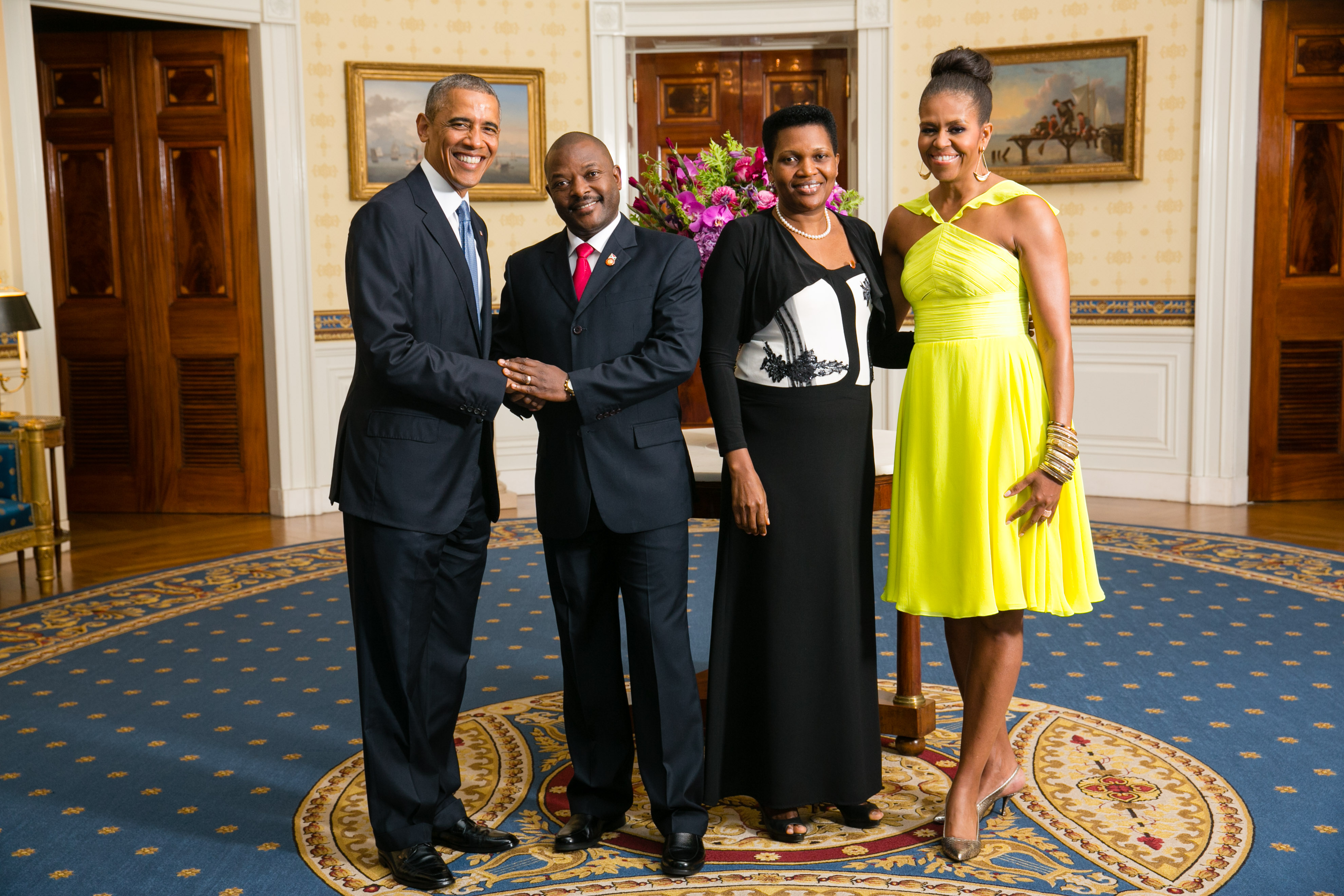

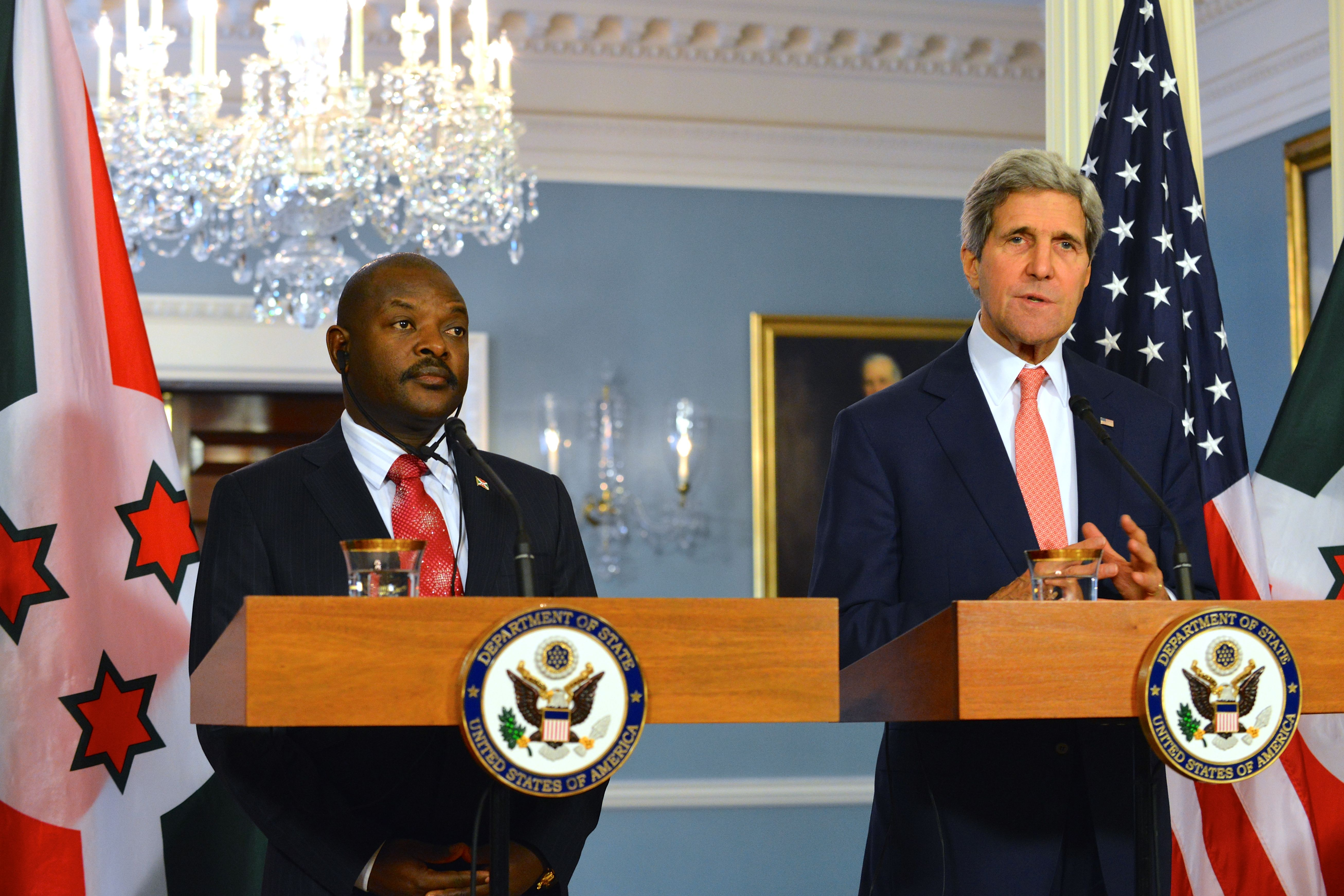

== Cameroon ==
Table of trips
Dates	Guest	Title	Reason
March 13–18, 1962	Ahmadou Ahidjo	President	Presidential guest. Afterwards visited New York City.
October 19–25, 1967	Ahmadou Ahidjo	President	Informal visit; visited New York City and Pittsburgh.
October 9, 1979	Ahmadou Ahidjo	President	Private visit
July 25–28, 1982	Ahmadou Ahidjo	President	Official working visit. Private visit to Gainesville, Florida afterwards.
February 25–28, 1986	Paul Biya	President	Official working visit. Private visit to Los Angeles afterwards.
May 6, 1991	Paul Biya	President	Private visit; met with President Bush.
March 20-21, 2003	Paul Biya	President	Working visit
June 22–29, 2003	Paul Biya	Prime Minister	Attended United States-Africa Business Summit on June 24–27; met with President George W. Bush during a private visit on June 26.
August 2–6, 2014	Paul Biya	President	Attended the U.S.-Africa Leaders' Summit.
December 13–15, 2022	Paul Biya	President	Attended the U.S.-Africa Leaders' Summit.

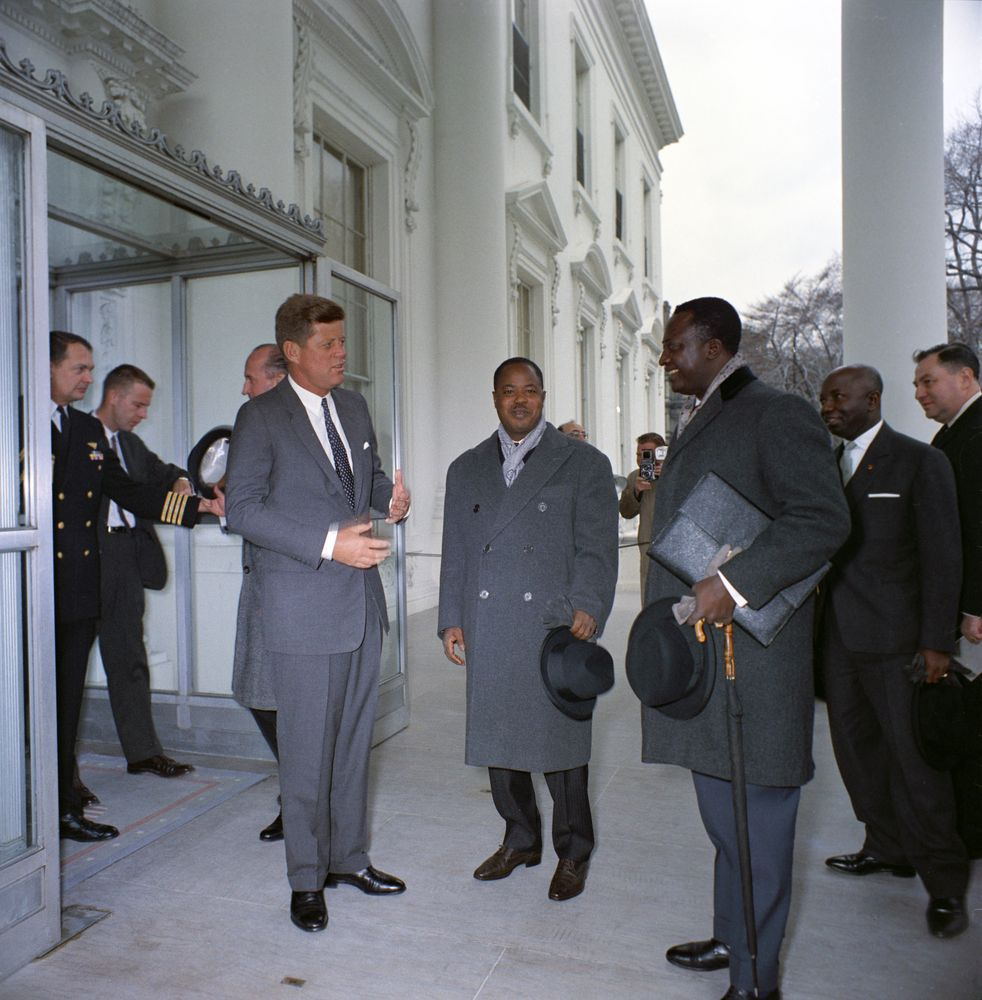

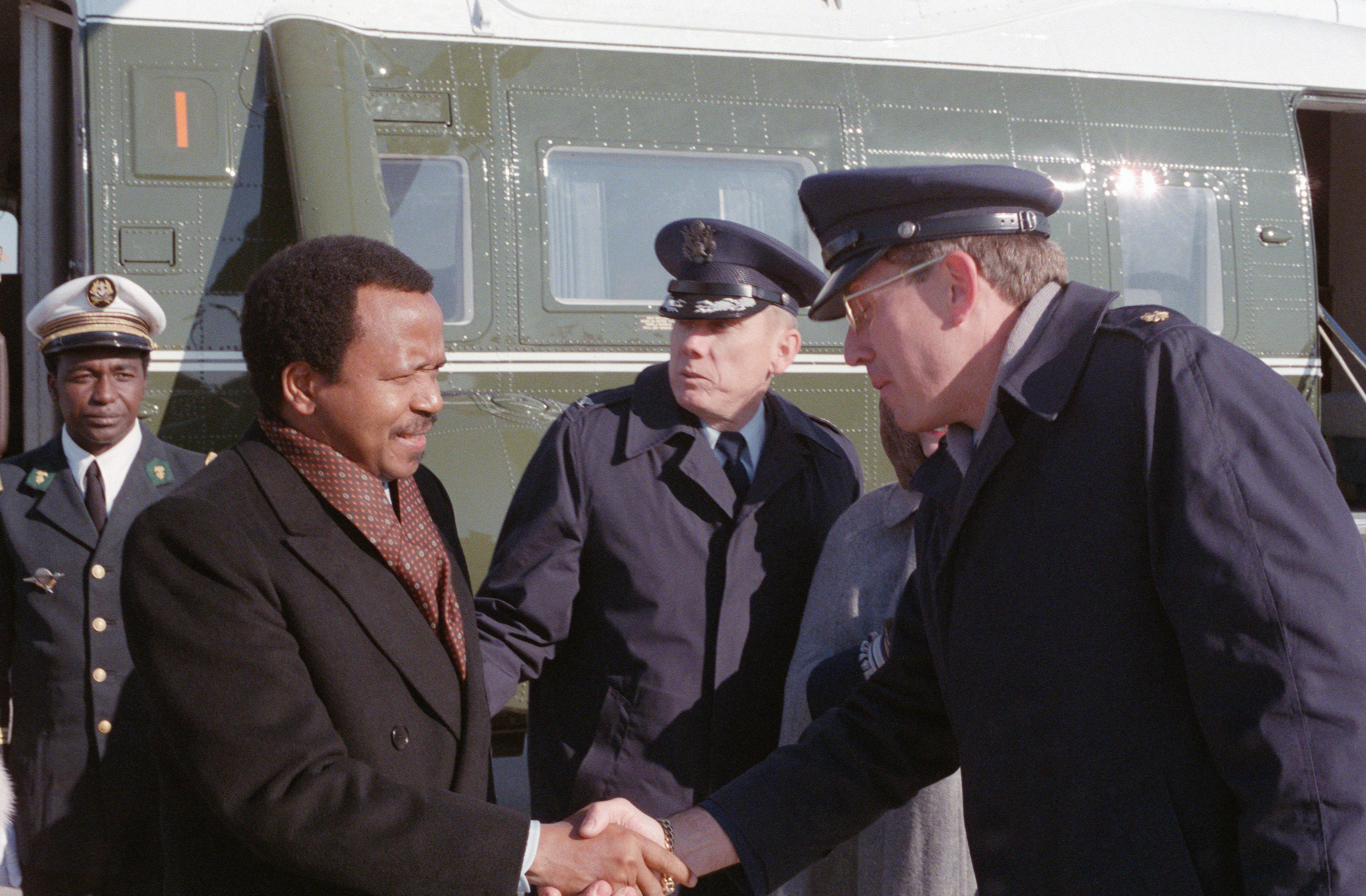

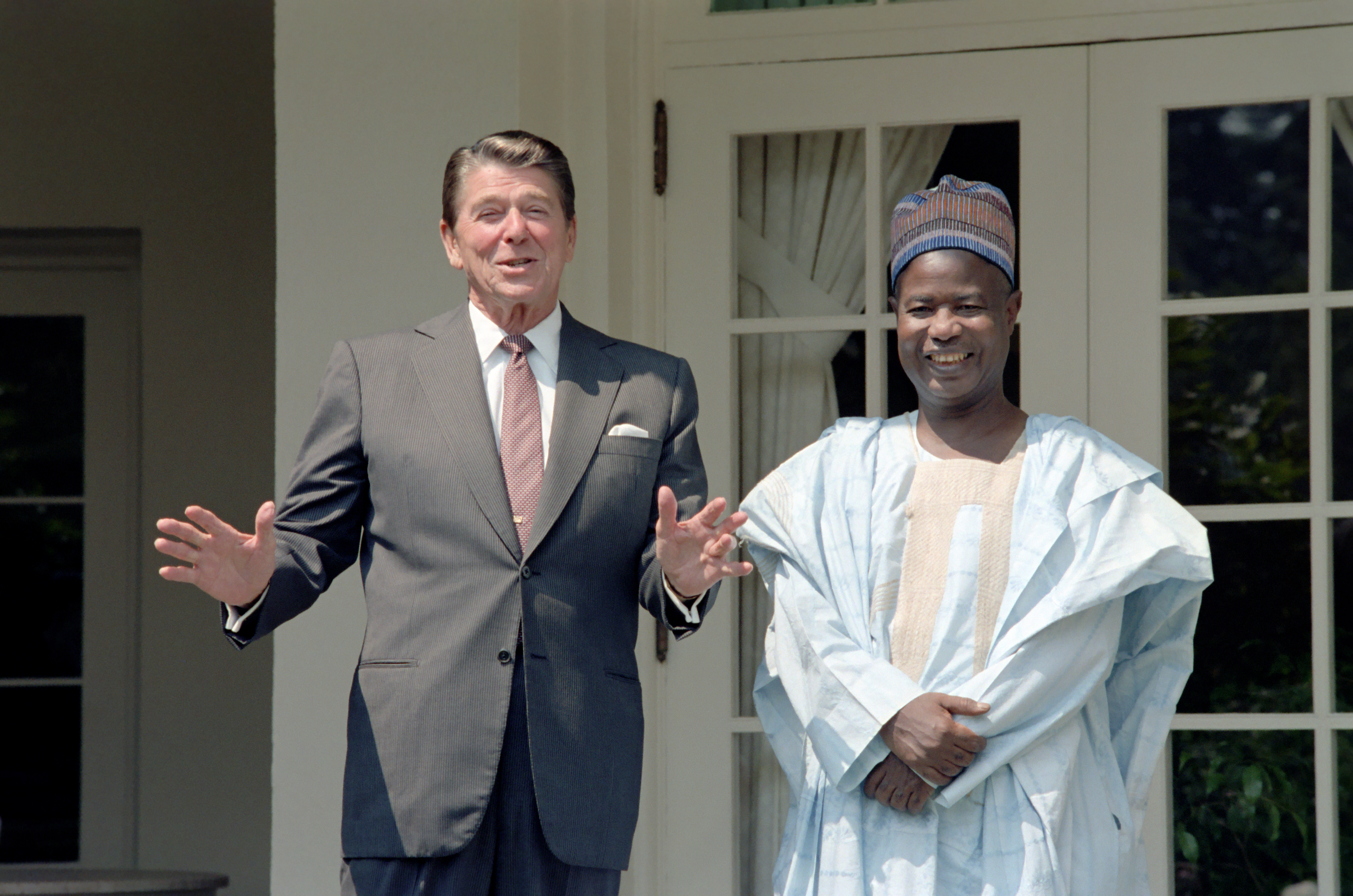

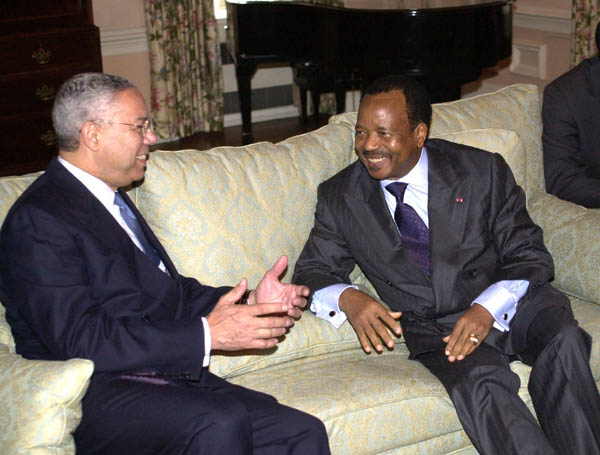

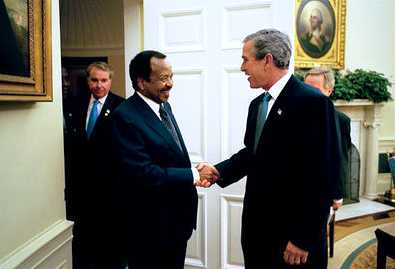

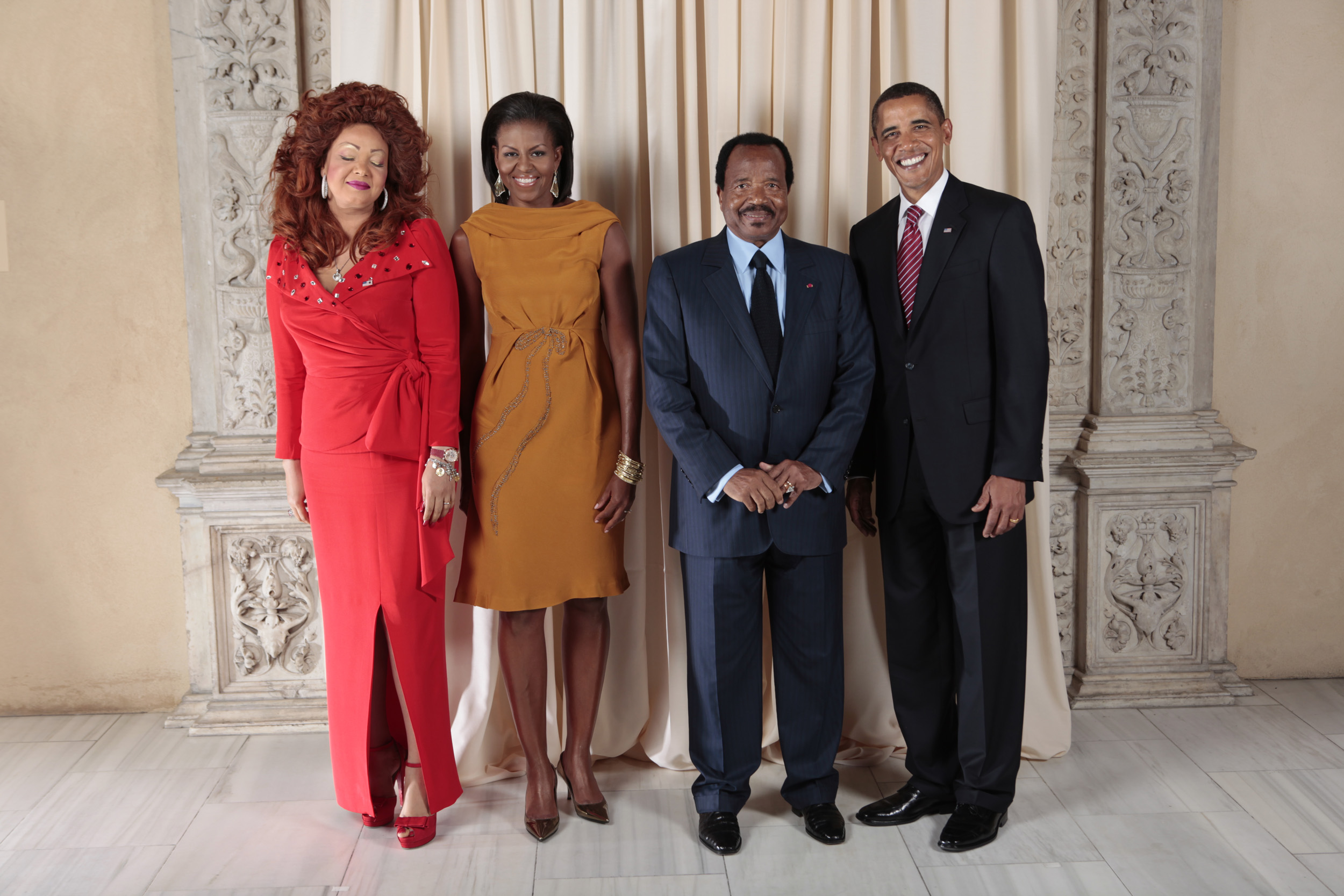

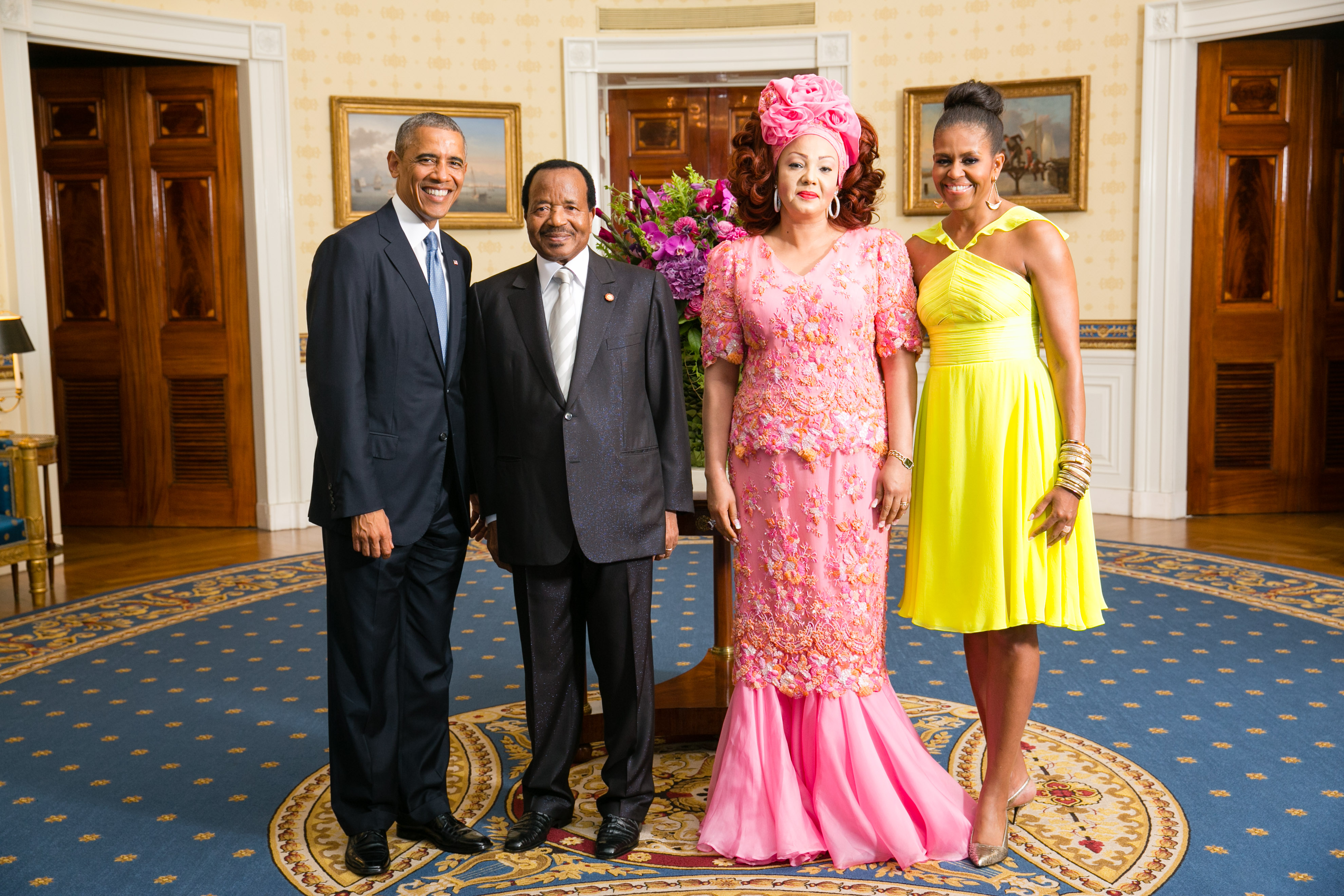

== Cape Verde ==
Table of trips
Dates	Guest	Title	Reason
October 3–7, 1983	Aristides Maria Pereira	President	Private visit; met with President Reagan on October 3.
January 30, 1992	Carlos Veiga	Prime Minister	Met with President Bush while attending a United Nations Security Council summit in New York City.
March 28, 2013	José Maria Neves	Prime Minister	Attended the African Leaders Summit.
August 4–6, 2014	Jorge Carlos Fonseca	President	Attended the United States–Africa Leaders Summit.

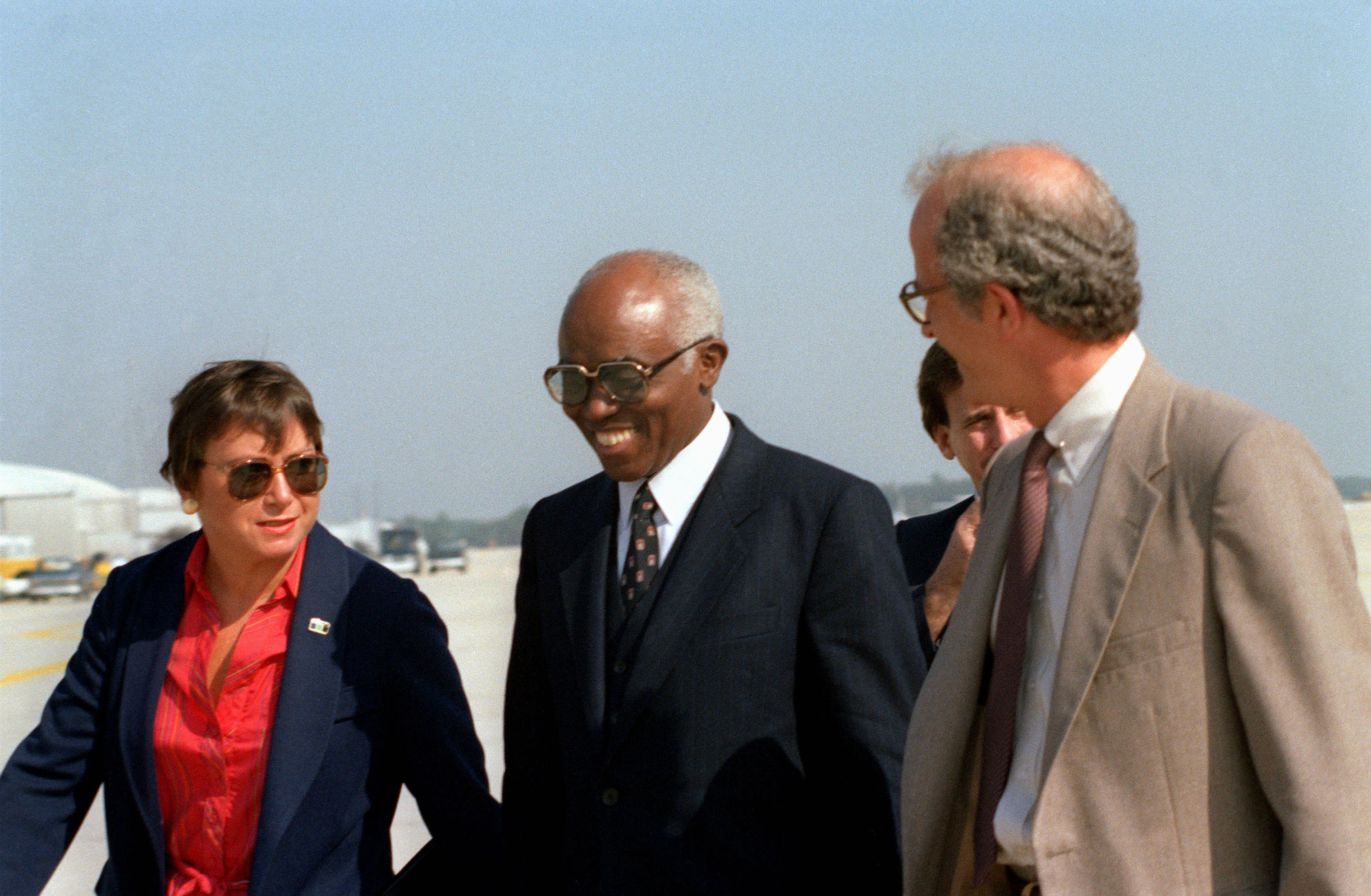

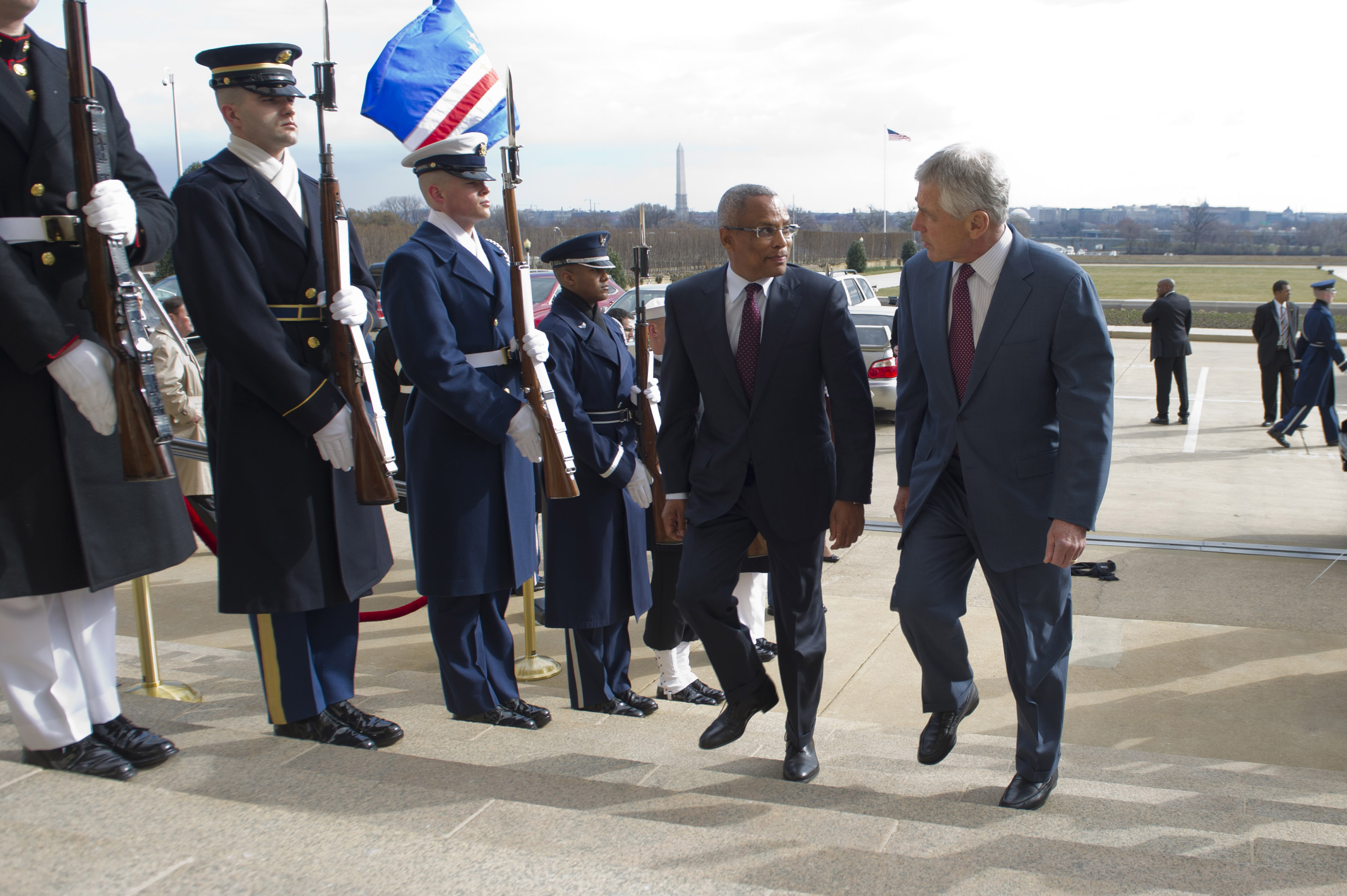

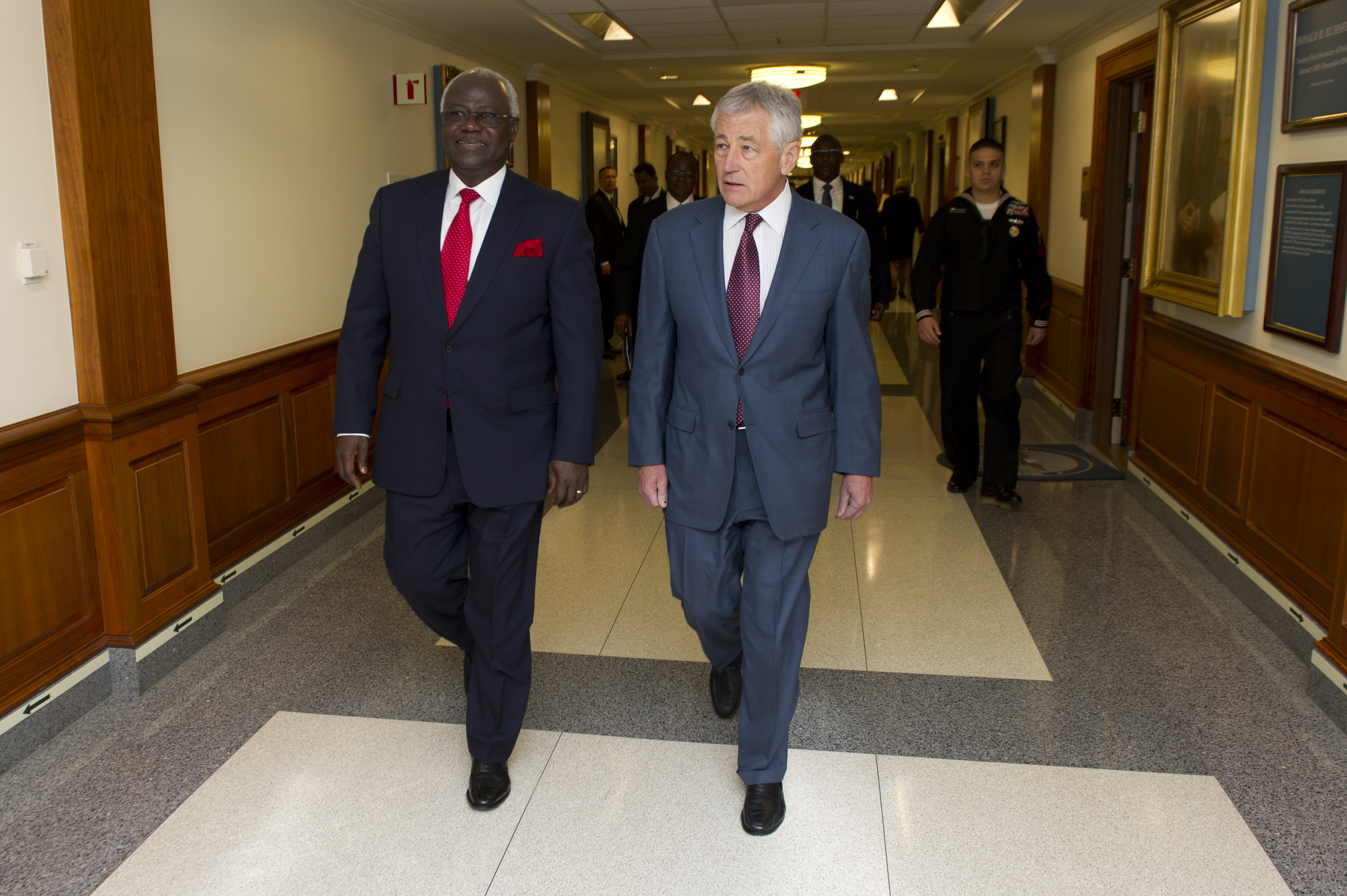

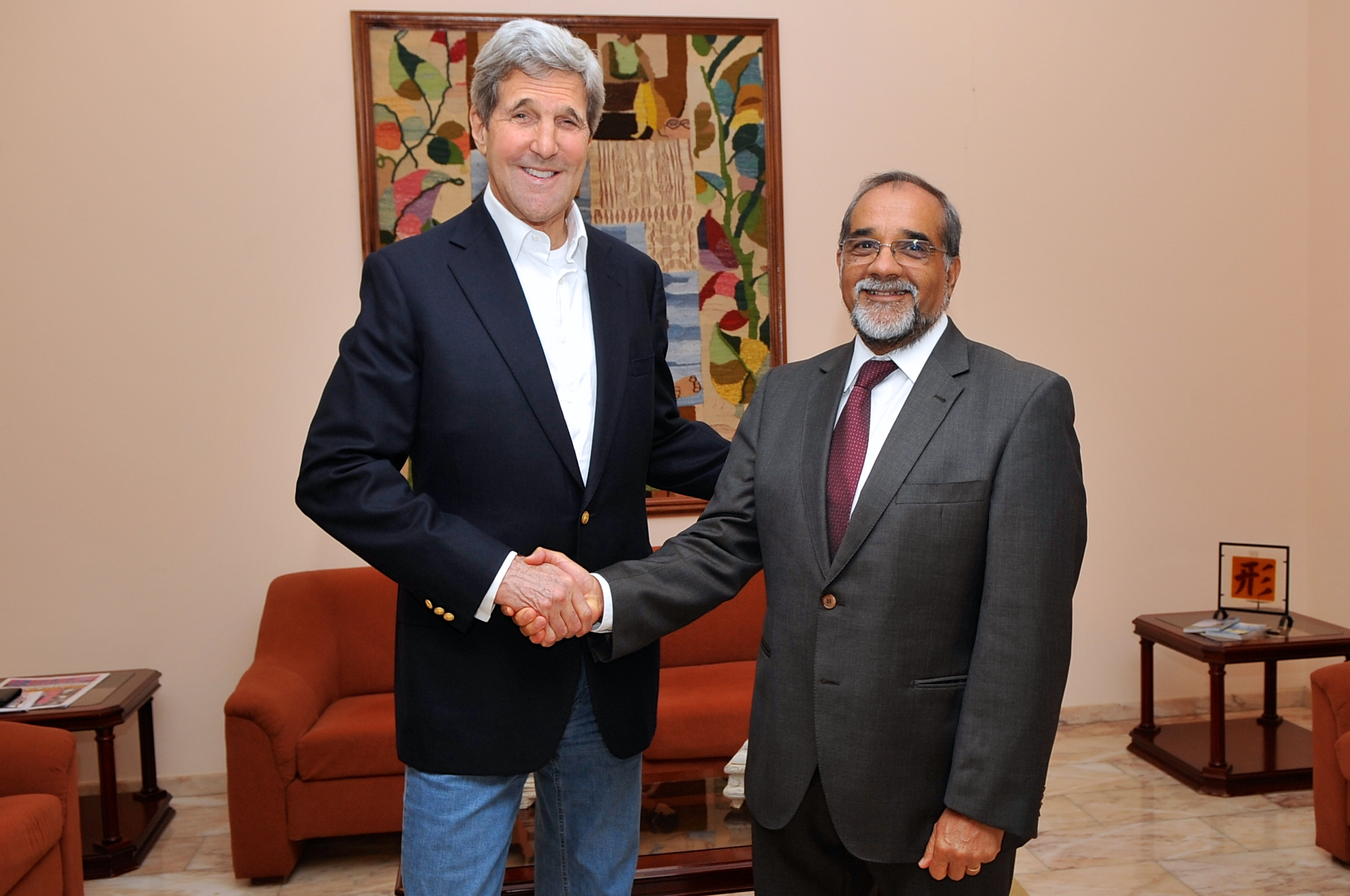

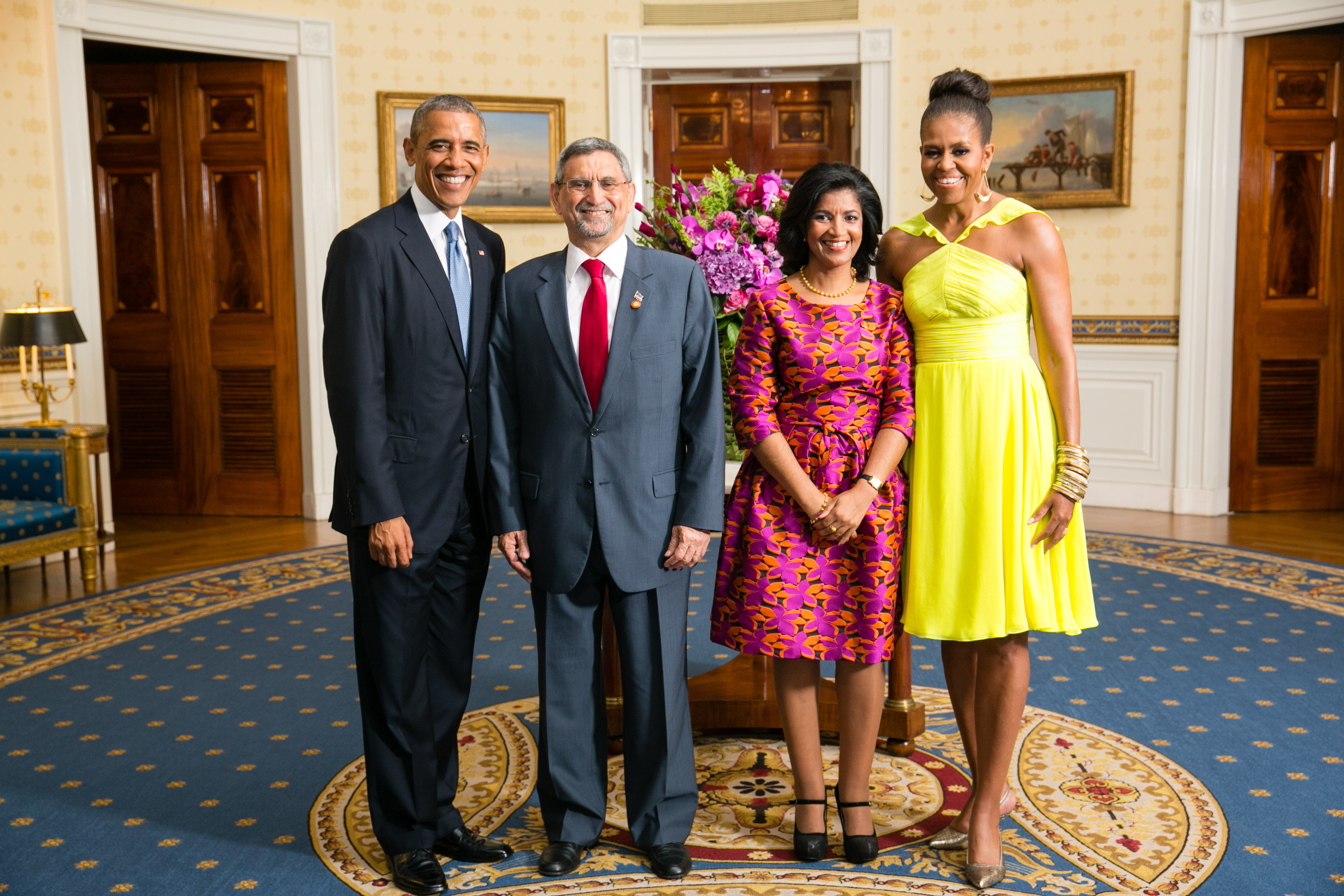

== Central African Republic ==
Table of trips
Dates	Guest	Title	Reason
October 19, 1995	Ange-Félix Patassé	President	Attended Africare dinner with President Clinton.
December 13–15, 2022	Faustin-Archange Touadéra	President	Attended the U.S.-Africa Leaders' Summit.

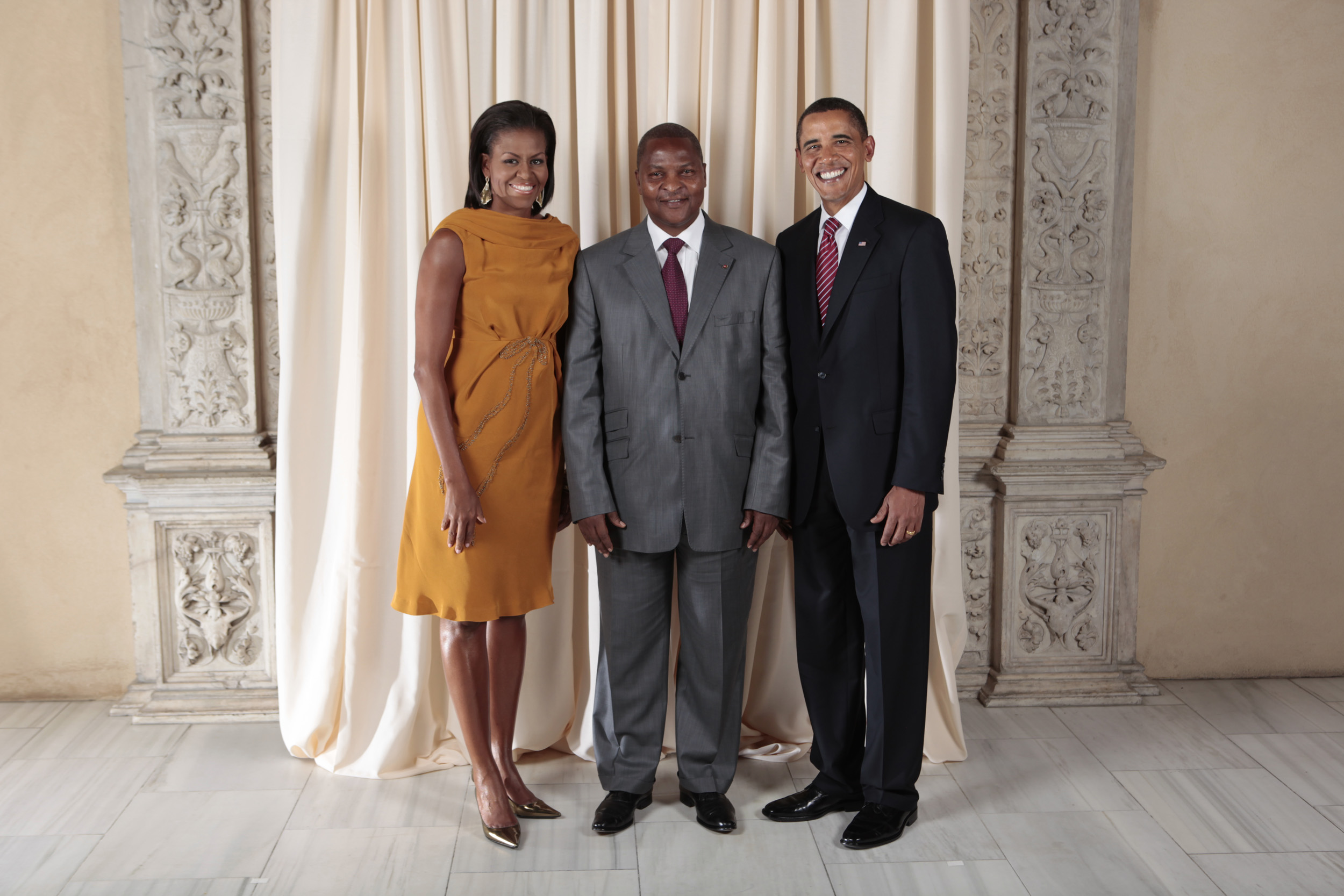

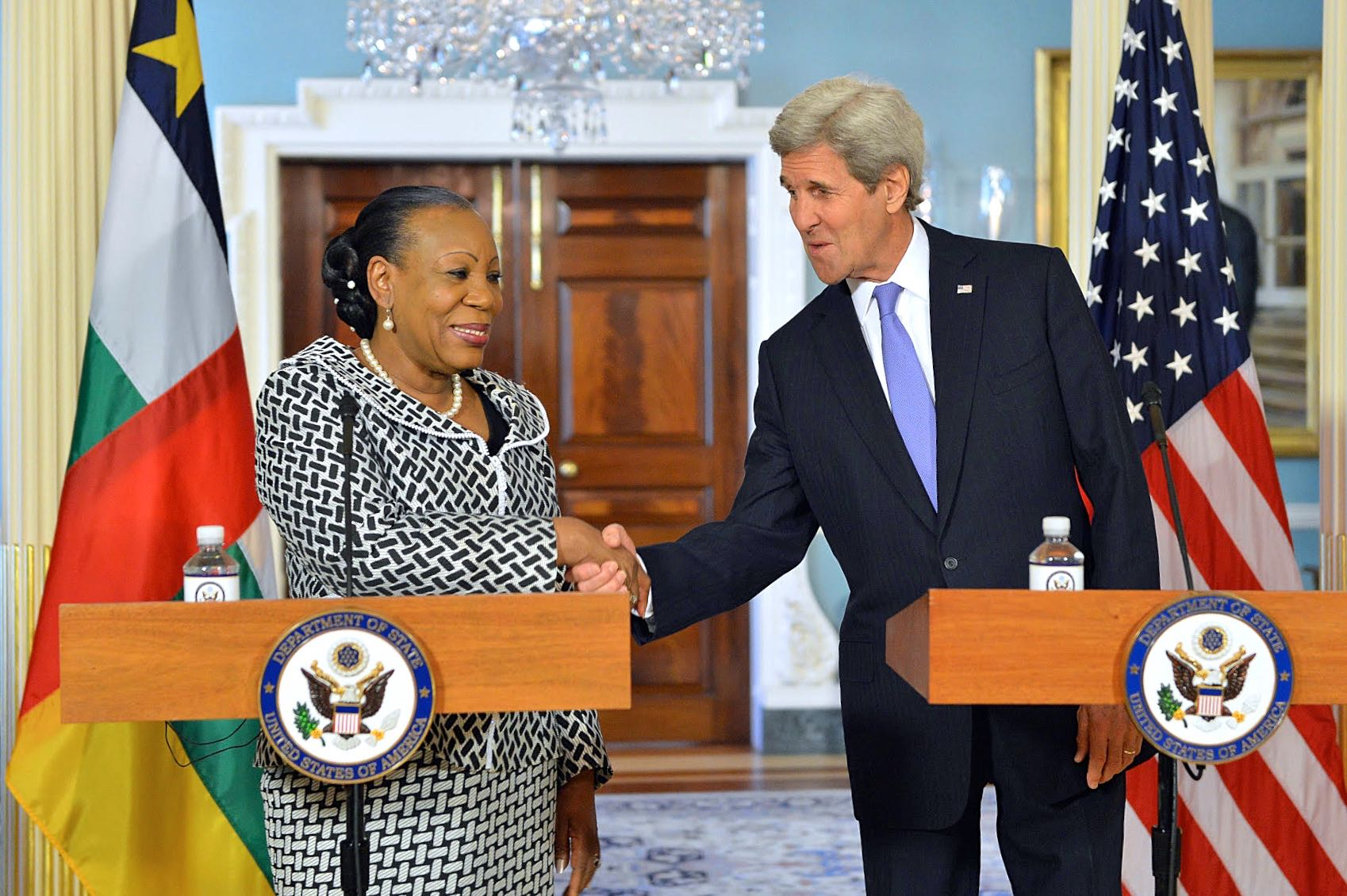

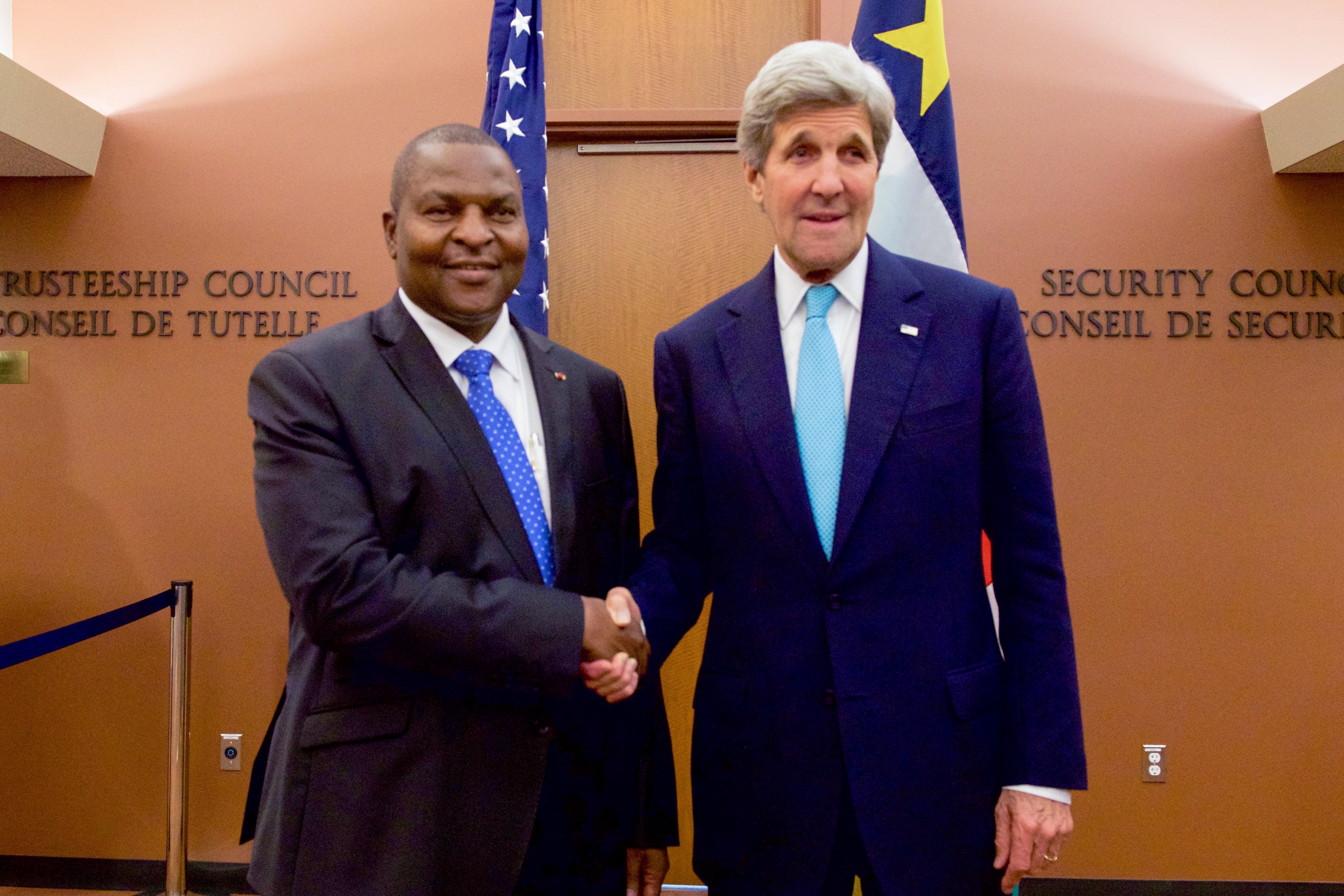

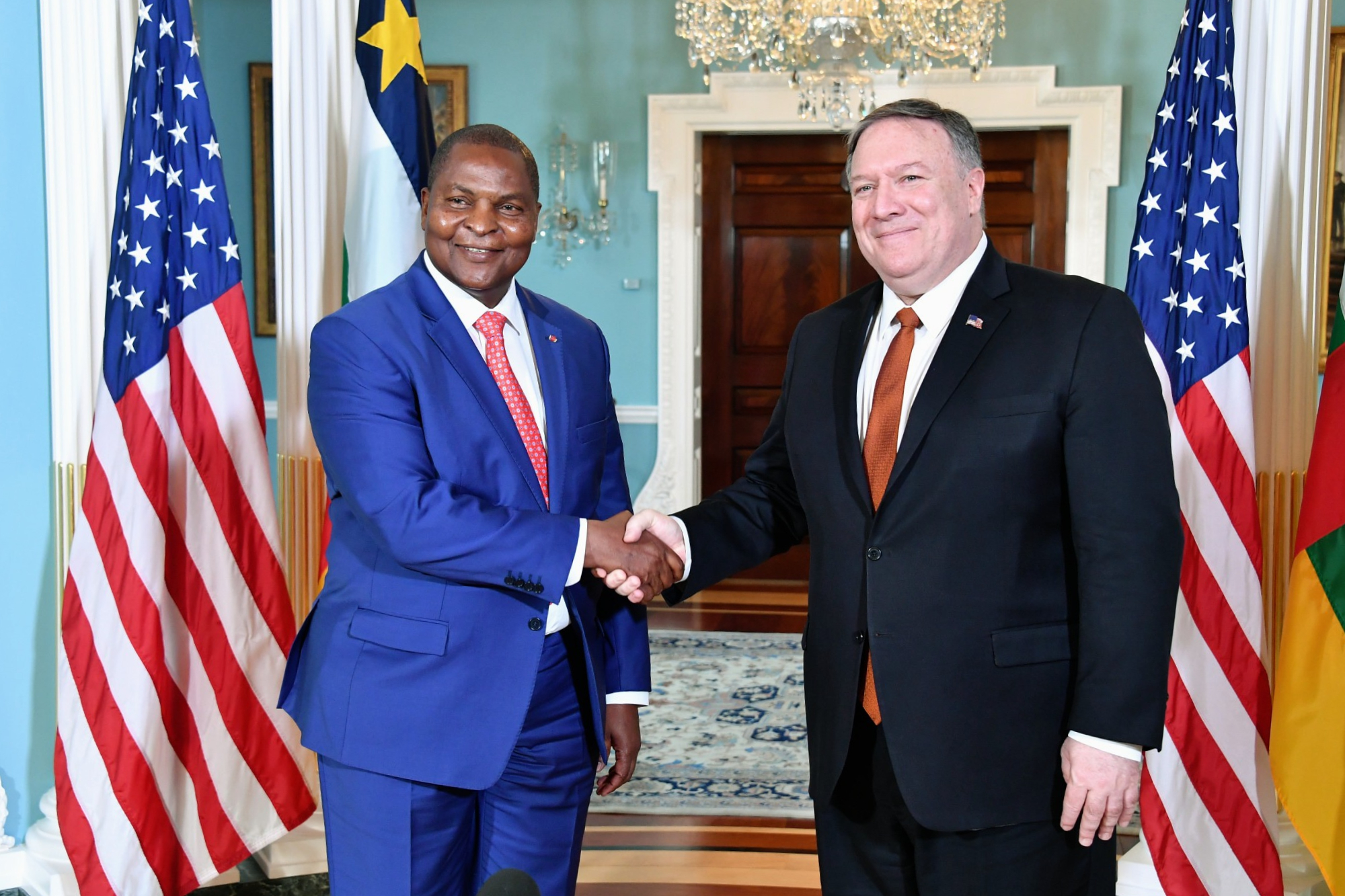

== Chad ==
Table of trips
Dates	Guest	Title	Reason
October 2–6, 1968	François Tombalbaye	President	Official visit; visited San Antonio, Lubbock, Cape Kennedy, and New York City.
October 24, 1970	François Tombalbaye	President	Attended a dinner at the White House celebrating the 25th anniversary of the United Nations.
June 18–23, 1987	Hissène Habré	President	Official working visit
August 4–6, 2014	Idriss Déby	President	Attended the U.S.-Africa Leaders' Summit.
December 13–15, 2022	Mahamat Déby	President	Attended the U.S.-Africa Leaders' Summit.

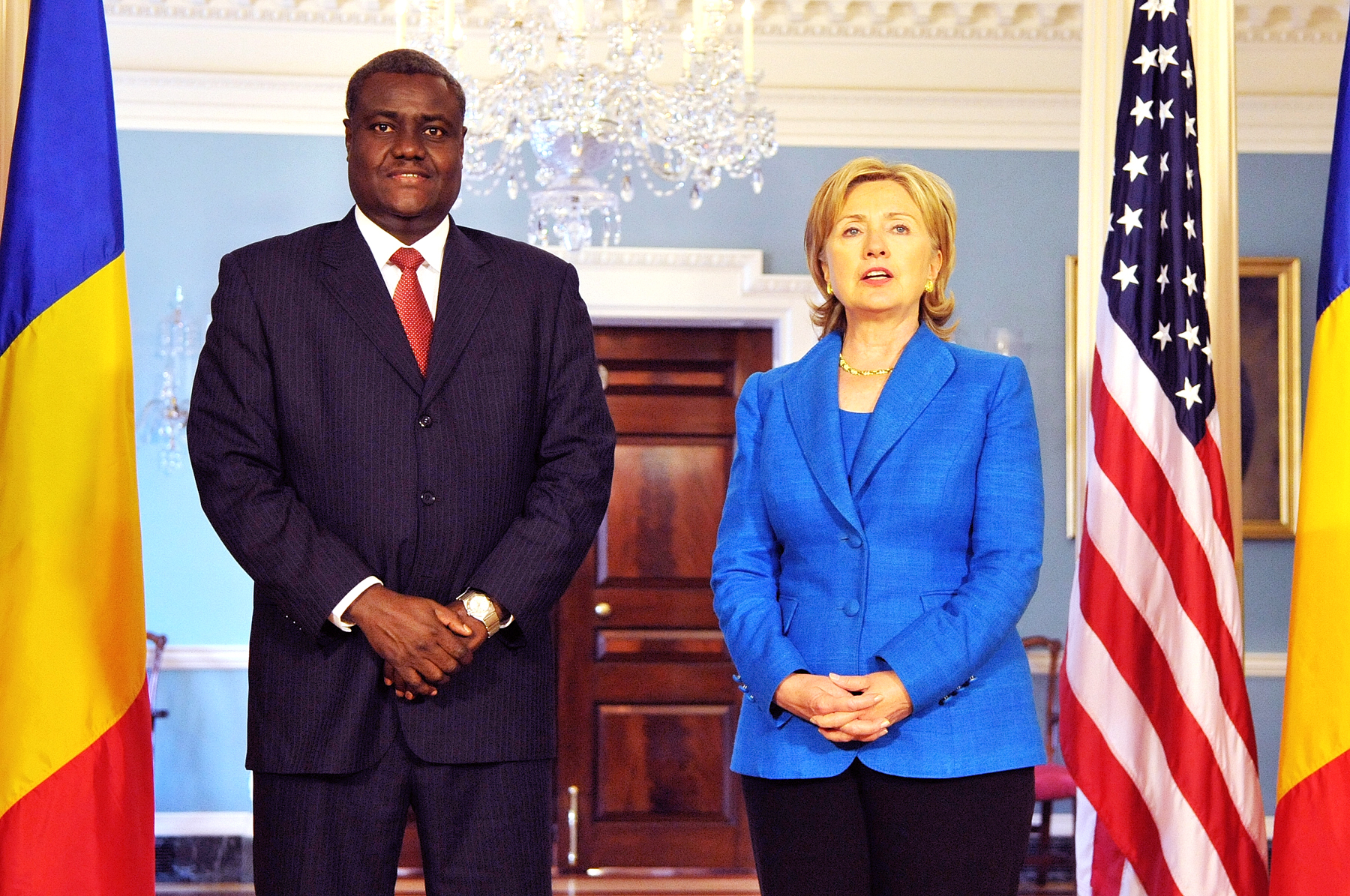

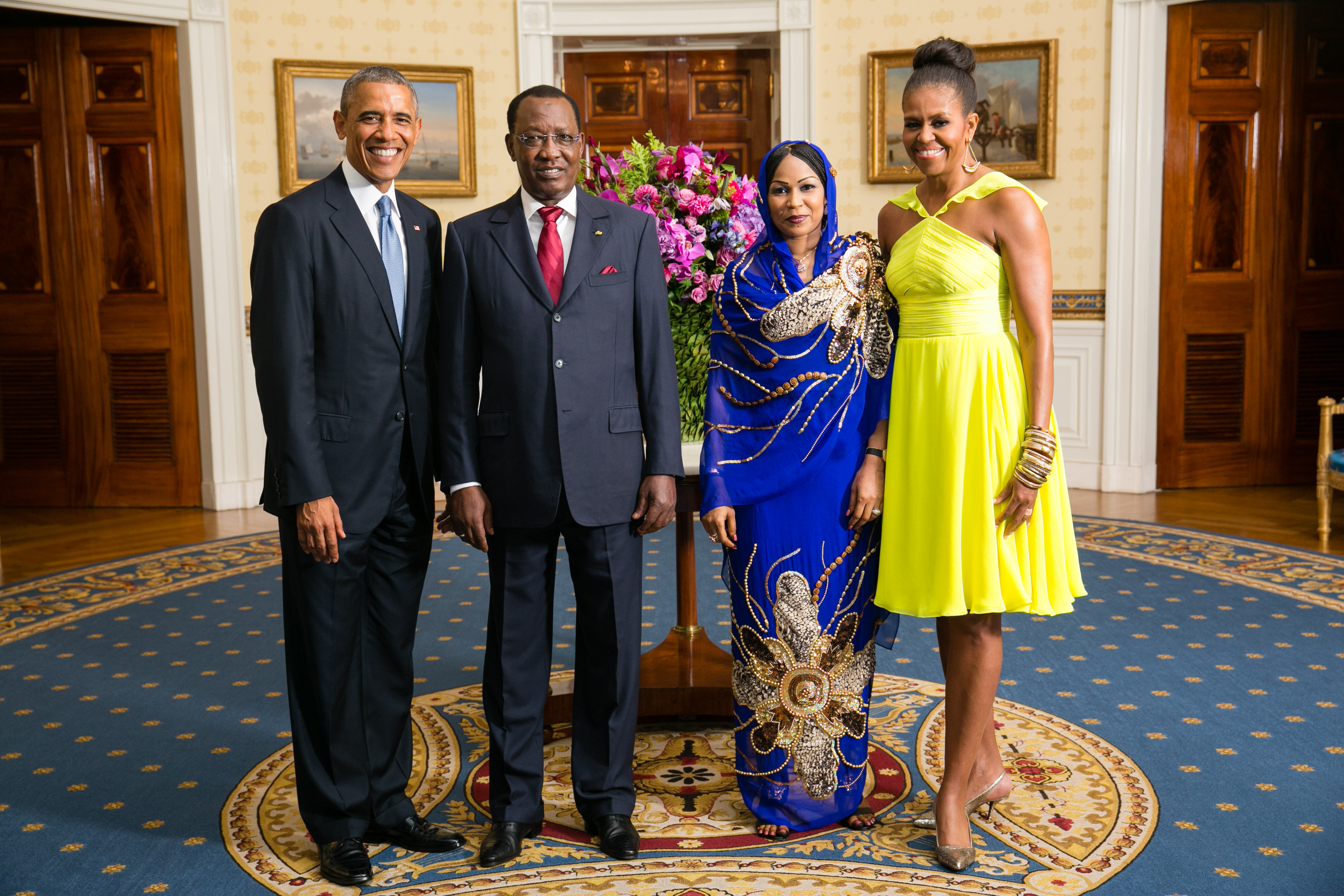

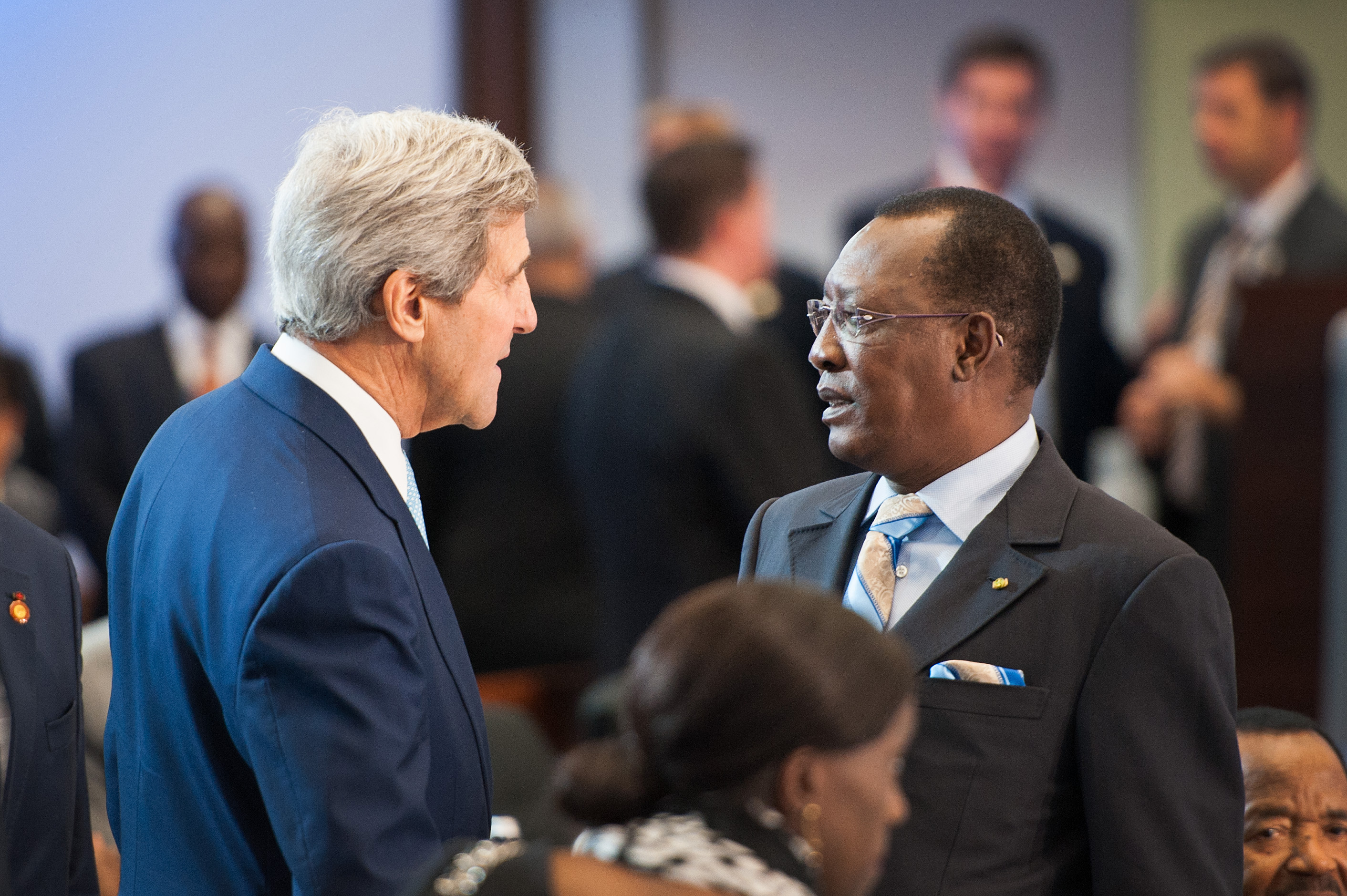

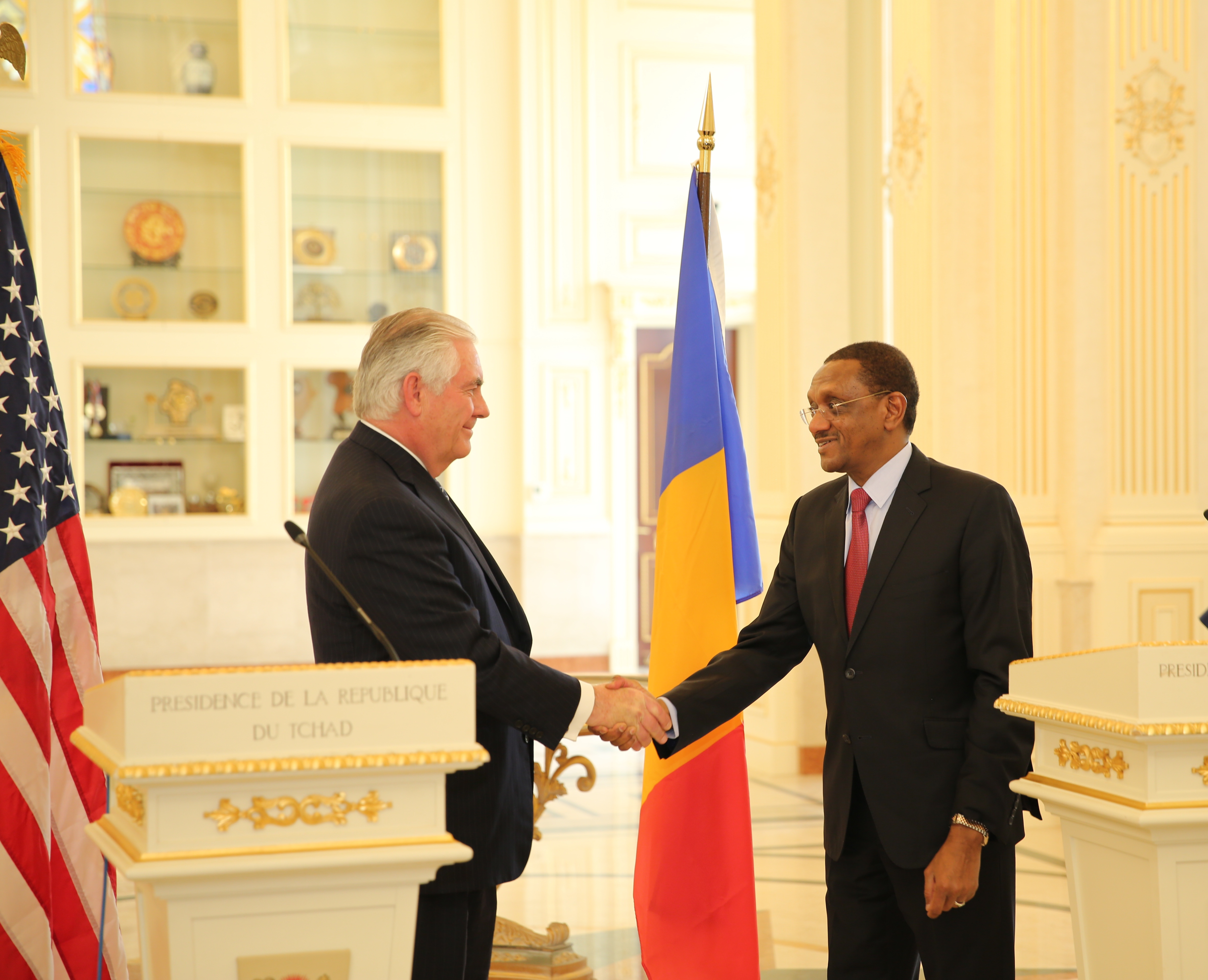

== Comoros ==
Table of trips
Dates	Guest	Title	Reason
August 5–6, 2014	Ikililou Dhoinine	President	Attended the U.S.-Africa Leaders' Summit.
December 13–15, 2022	Azali Assoumani	President	Attended the U.S.-Africa Leaders' Summit.

== Congo (Democratic Republic of) (Zaire) ==
Table of trips
Dates	Guest	Title	Reason
July 27–29, 1960	Patrice Lumumba	Prime Minister	Met with Secretary of State Christian Herter and United Nations Secretary-General Dag Hammarskjöld.
February 5–8, 1962	Cyrille Adoula	Prime Minister	Informal visit. Afterwards visited New York City.
August 3–14, 1970	Mobutu Sese Seko	President	Official visit; visited Annapolis, New York City, Fort Bragg, San Francisco, and Los Angeles.
October 10, 1973	Mobutu Sese Seko	President	Private visit; met with President Nixon at the White House.
August 10–13, 1979	Mobutu Sese Seko	President	Private visit; attended an International Monetary Fund meeting. Also met with President Jimmy Carter on September 11.
November 29 – December 8, 1981	Mobutu Sese Seko	President	Private visit; met with President Reagan on December 1.
August 2–6, 1983	Mobutu Sese Seko	President	Official working visit
September 23, 1984	Mobutu Sese Seko	President	Private visit; met with President Reagan at a U.N. General Assembly reception in New York City.
December 6–12, 1986	Mobutu Sese Seko	President	Official working visit
June 28–30, 1989	Mobutu Sese Seko	President	Official working visit
October 4, 1989	Mobutu Sese Seko	President	Met with President Bush during a private visit.
August 13, 2002	Joseph Kabila	President	Met with President Bush at the U.N. General Assembly in New York City.
November 2 – December 6, 2003	Joseph Kabila	President	Working visit; met with President Bush at the Oval Office.
October 24–28, 2007	Joseph Kabila	President	Working visit
September 23, 2010	Joseph Kabila	President	Attended the United Nations General Assembly.
August 4–6, 2014	Joseph Kabila	President	Attended the U.S.-Africa Leaders' Summit. Met with Secretary of State John Kerry.
September 20, 2022	Felix Tshisekedi	President	Attended the United Nations General Assembly
December 13–15, 2022	Felix Tshisekedi	President	Attended the U.S.-Africa Leaders' Summit.

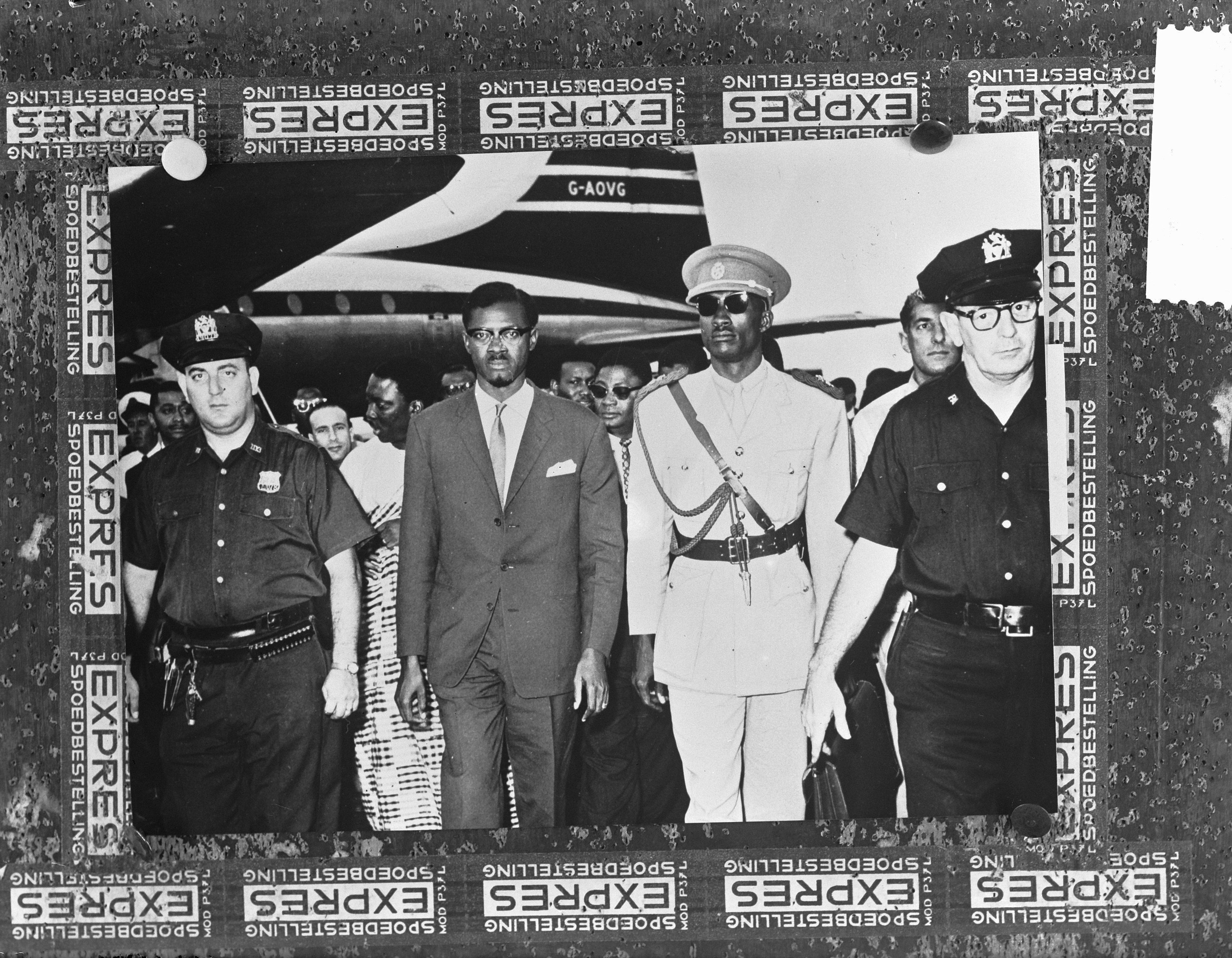

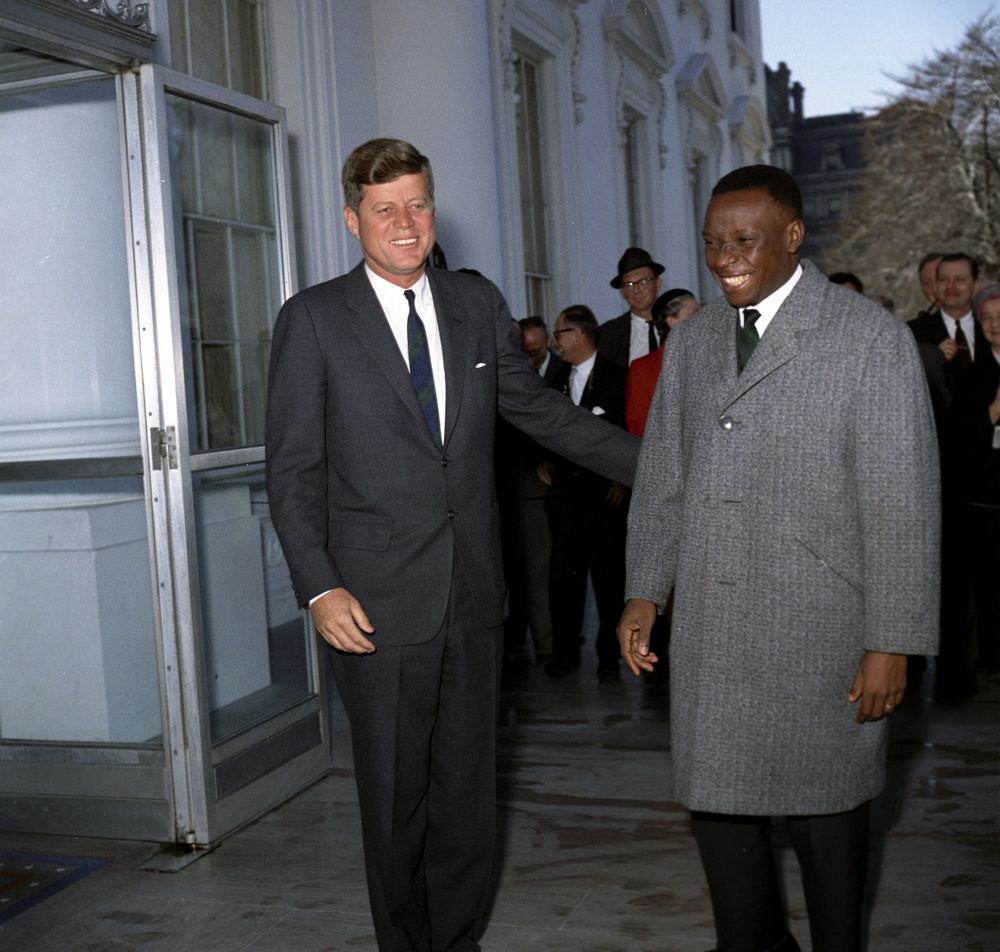

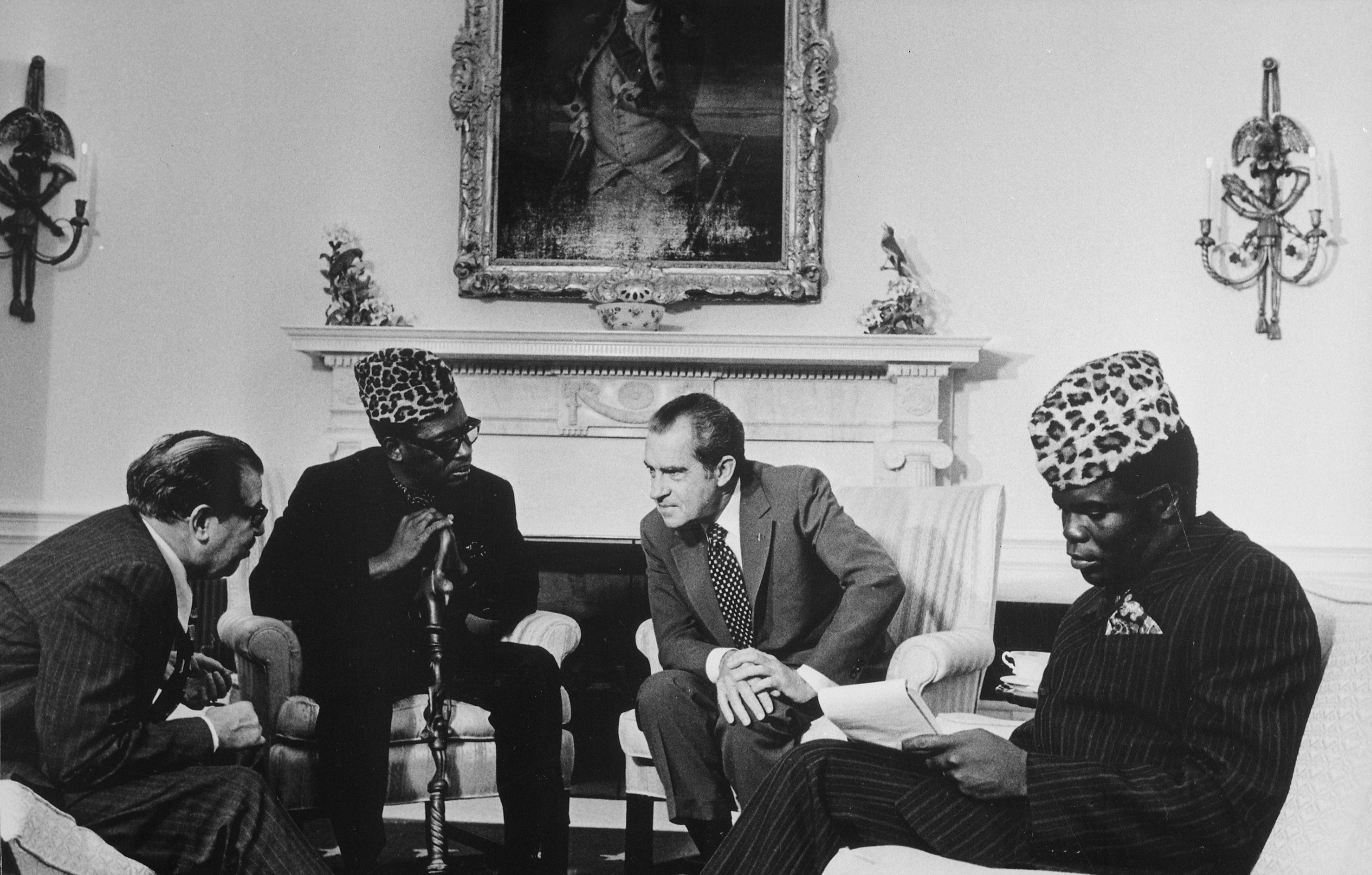

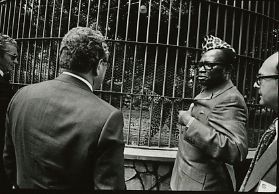

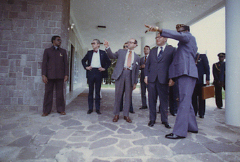

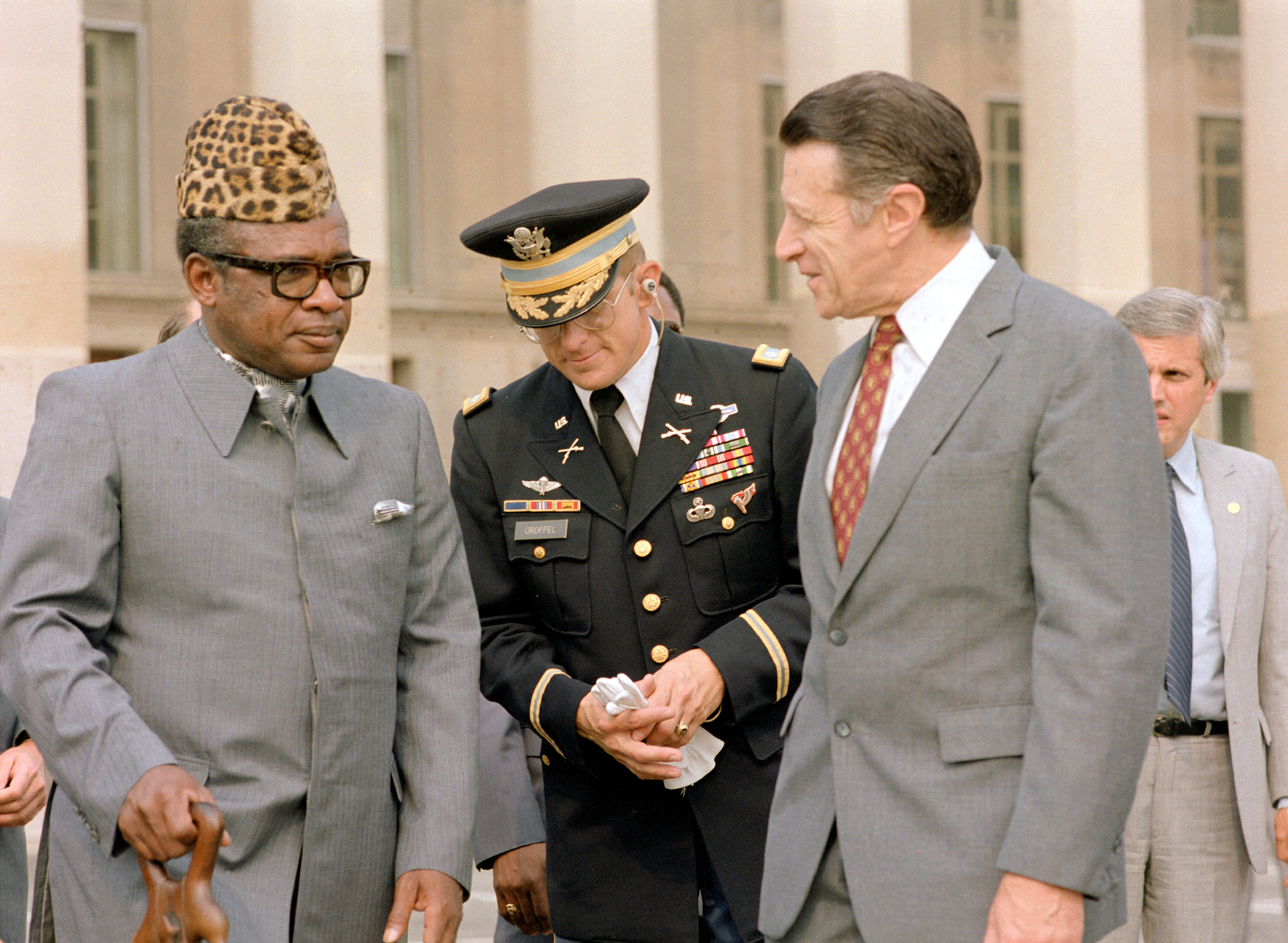

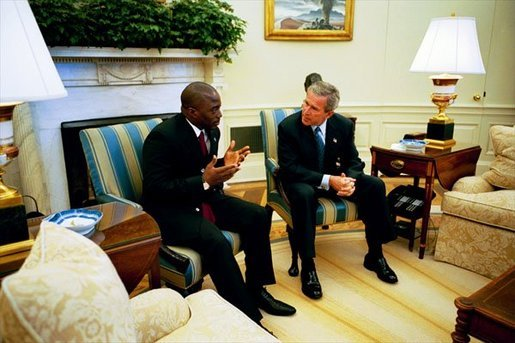

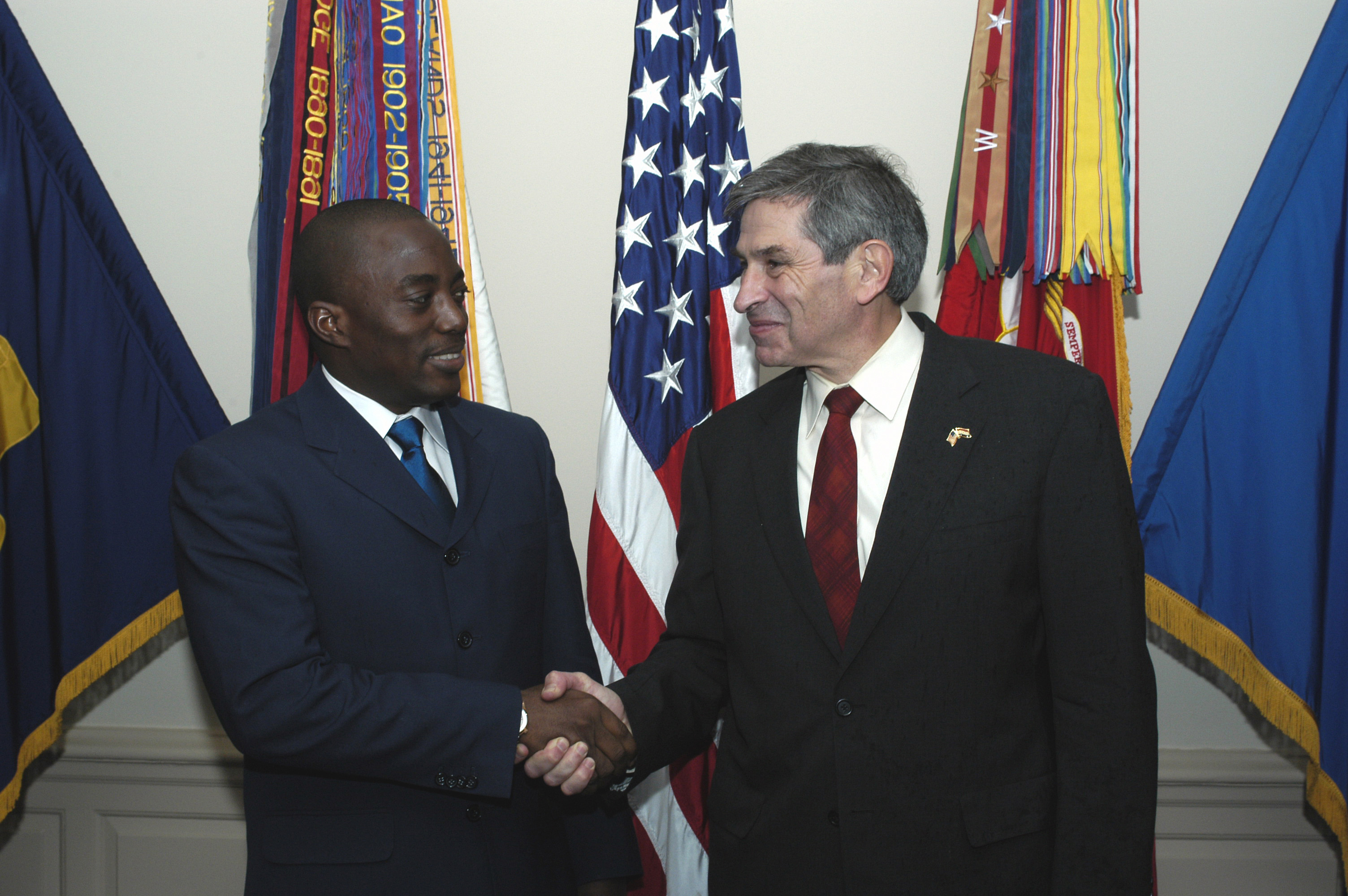

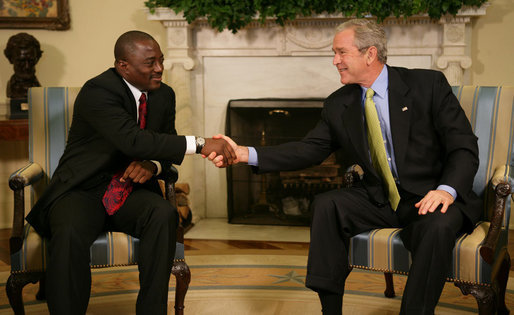

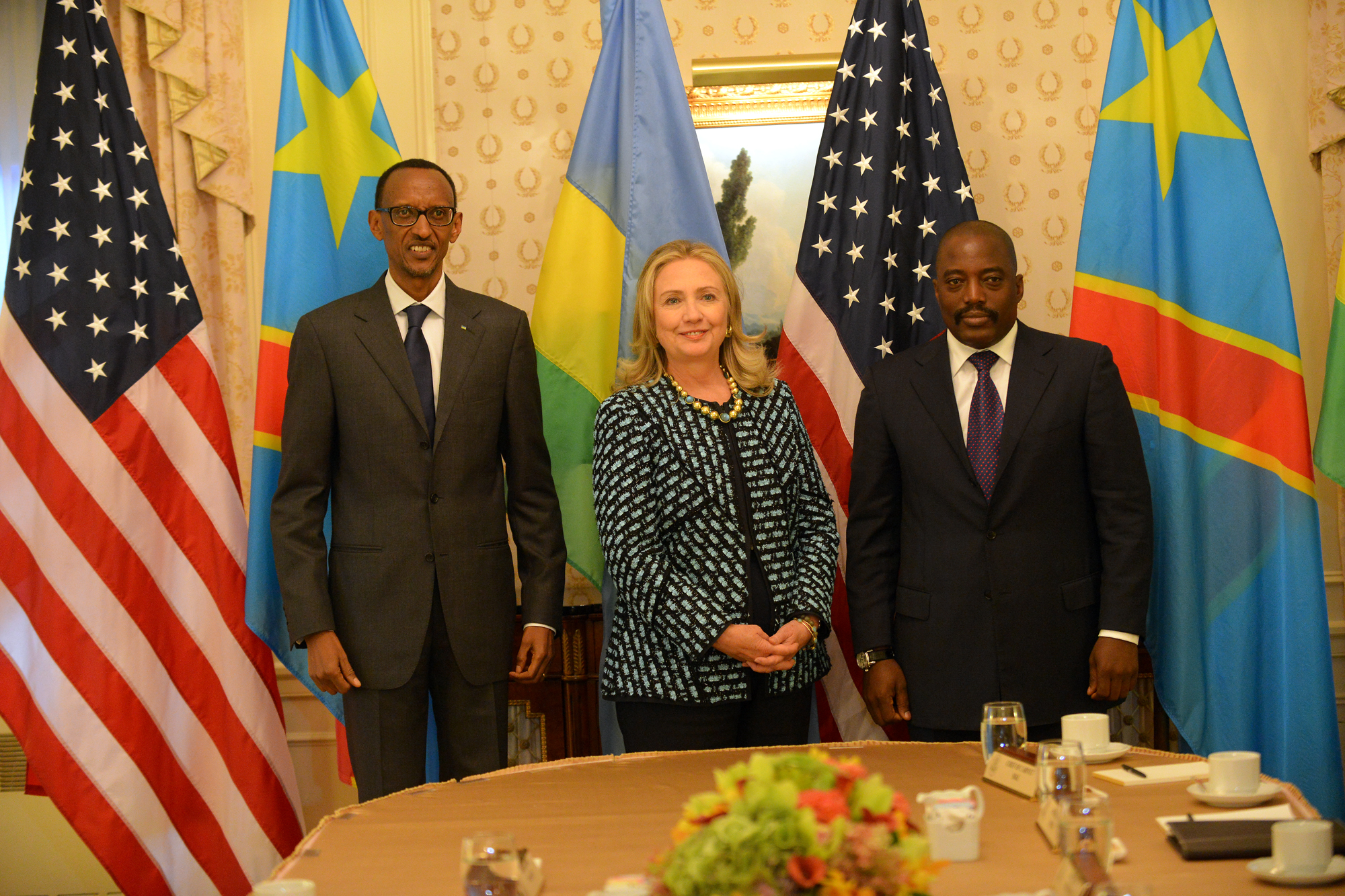

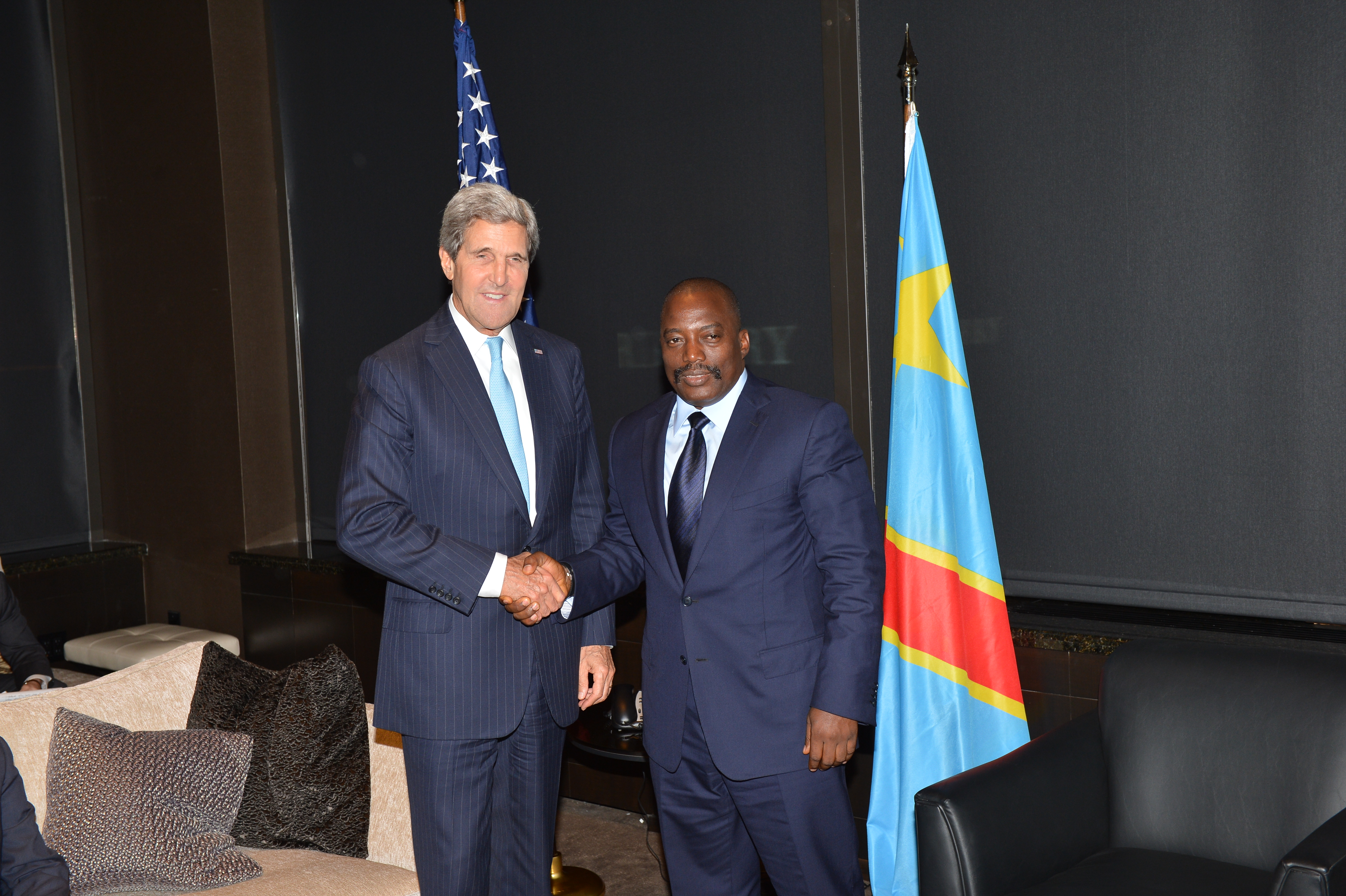

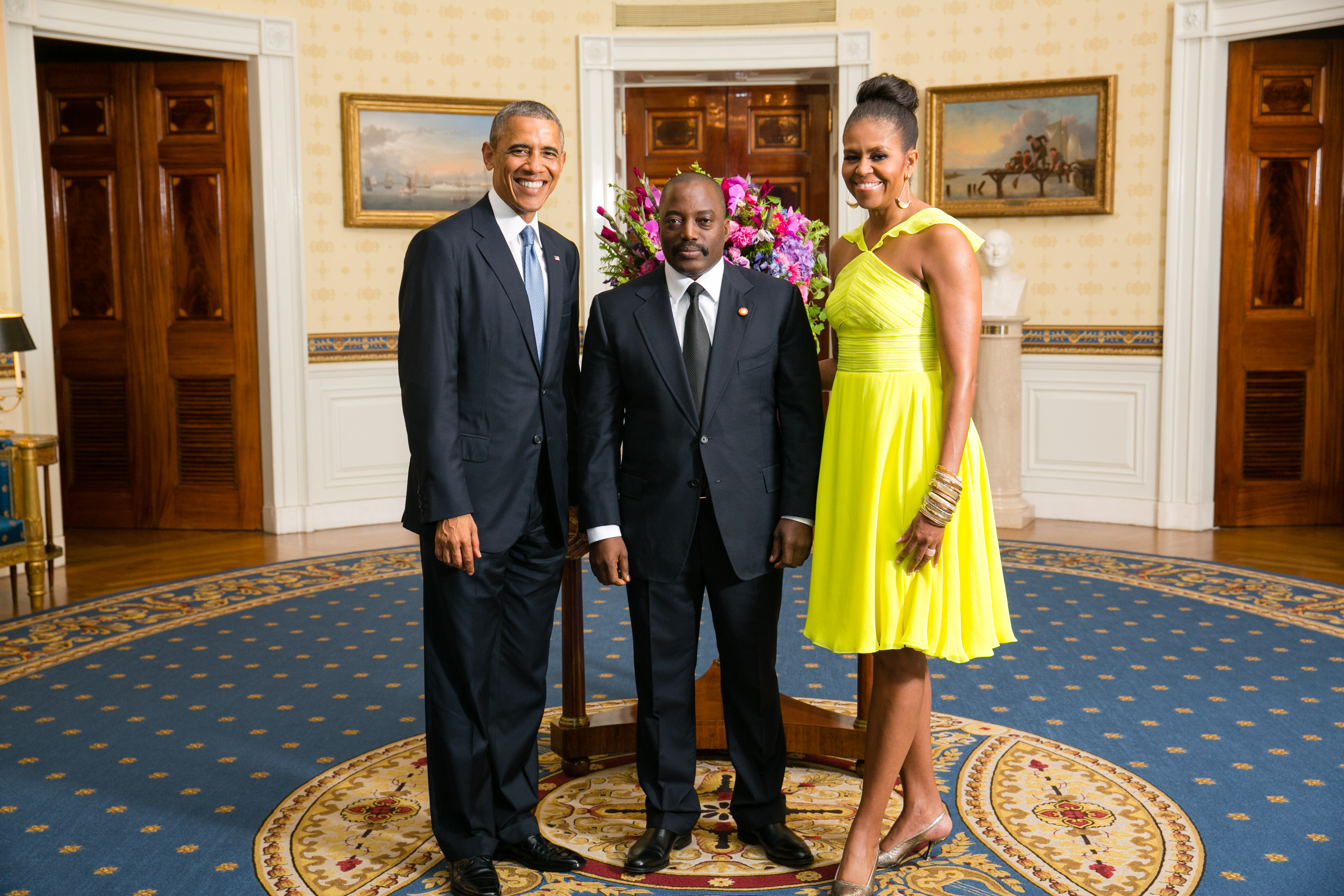

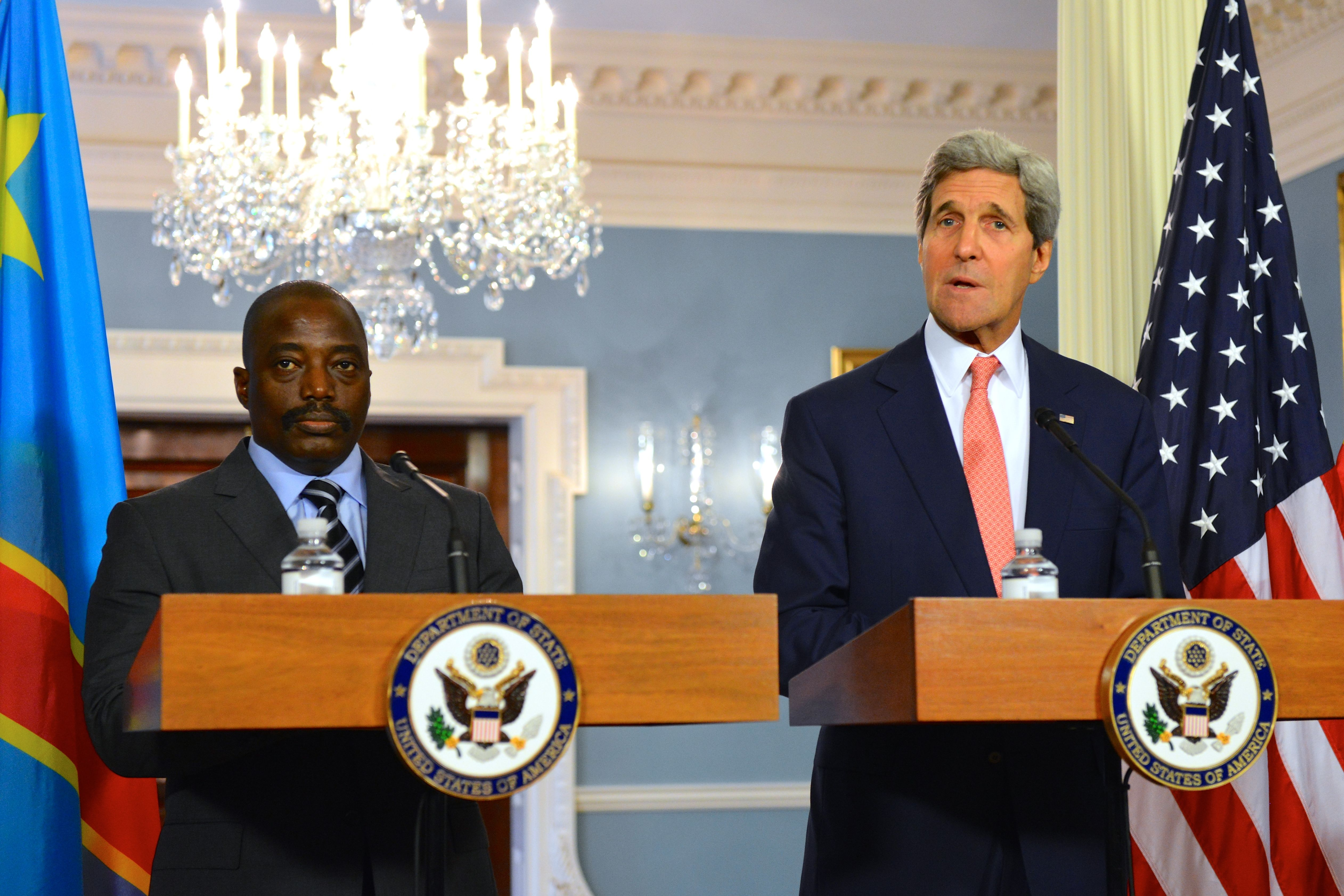

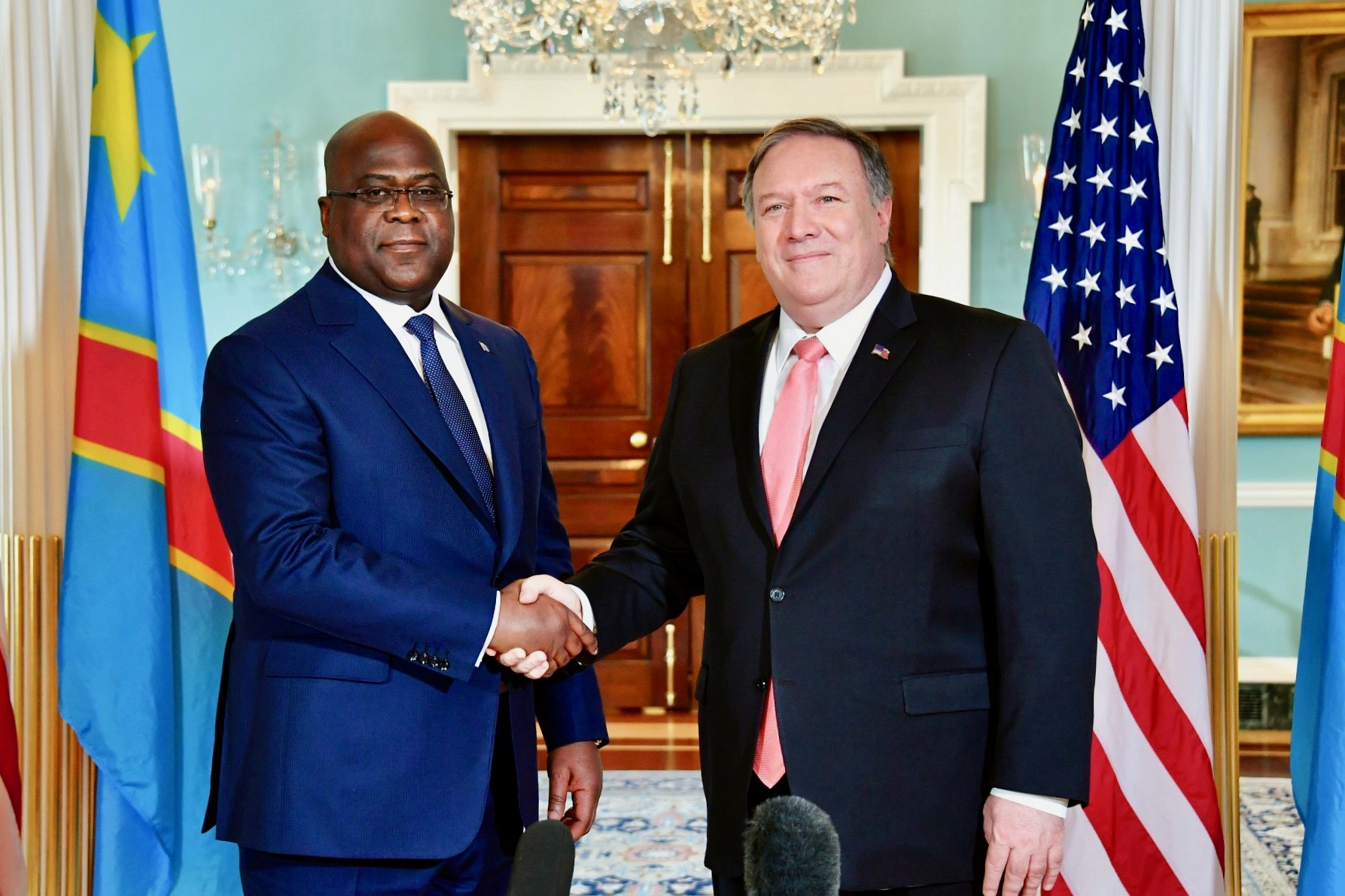

== Congo (Republic of) (Brazzaville) ==
Table of trips
Dates	Guest	Title	Reason
June 8–13, 1961	Fulbert Youlou	President	Informal visit. Afterwards visited New York City.
February 11–14, 1990	Denis Sassou-Nguesso	President	State visit. Private visit to Houston afterwards.
December 8–14, 1991	André Milongo	Prime Minister	Private visit. Met with President Bush on December 13. Also visited Atlanta.
June 24–27, 2003	Denis Sassou Nguesso	President	Attended the United States-Africa Business Summit. Met with President Bush during a private visit on June 26.
June 4–7, 2006	Denis Sassou Nguesso	President	Working visit
August 4–6, 2014	Denis Sassou Nguesso	President	Attended the U.S.-Africa Leaders' Summit.
December 13–15, 2022	Denis Sassou Nguesso	President	Attended the U.S.-Africa Leaders' Summit.

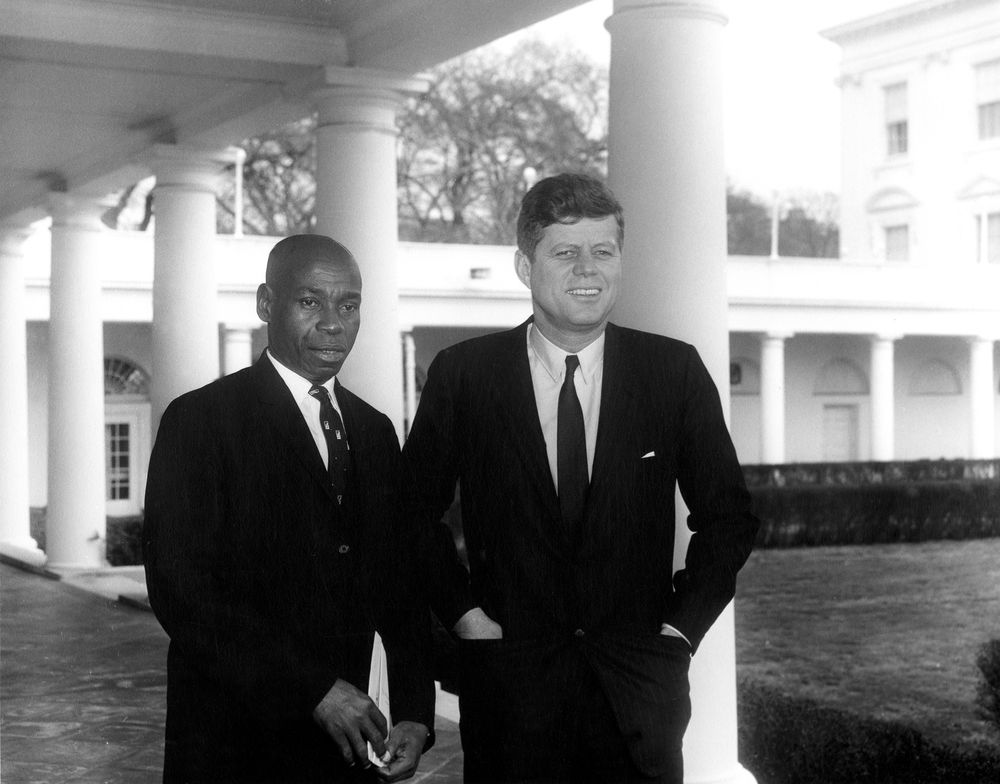

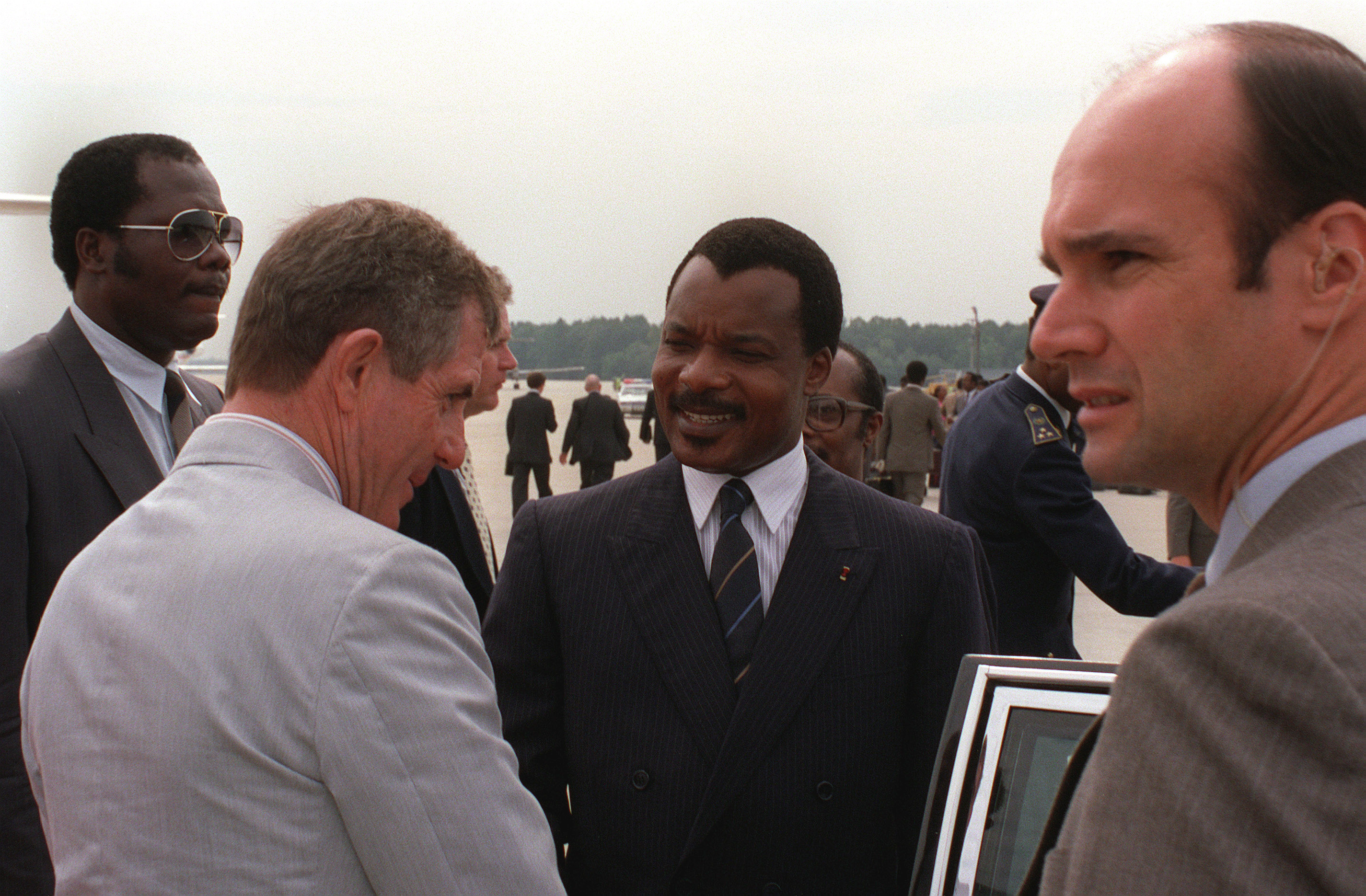

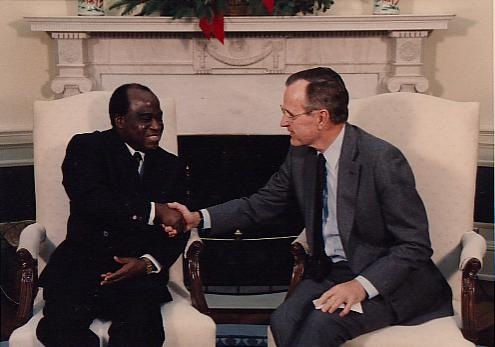

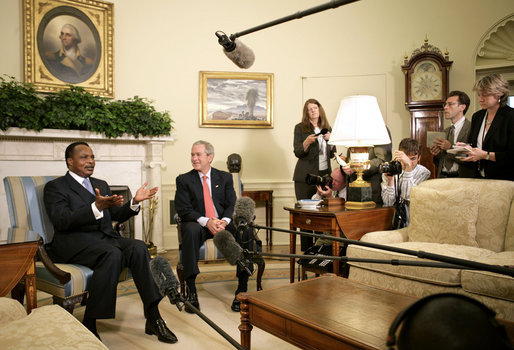

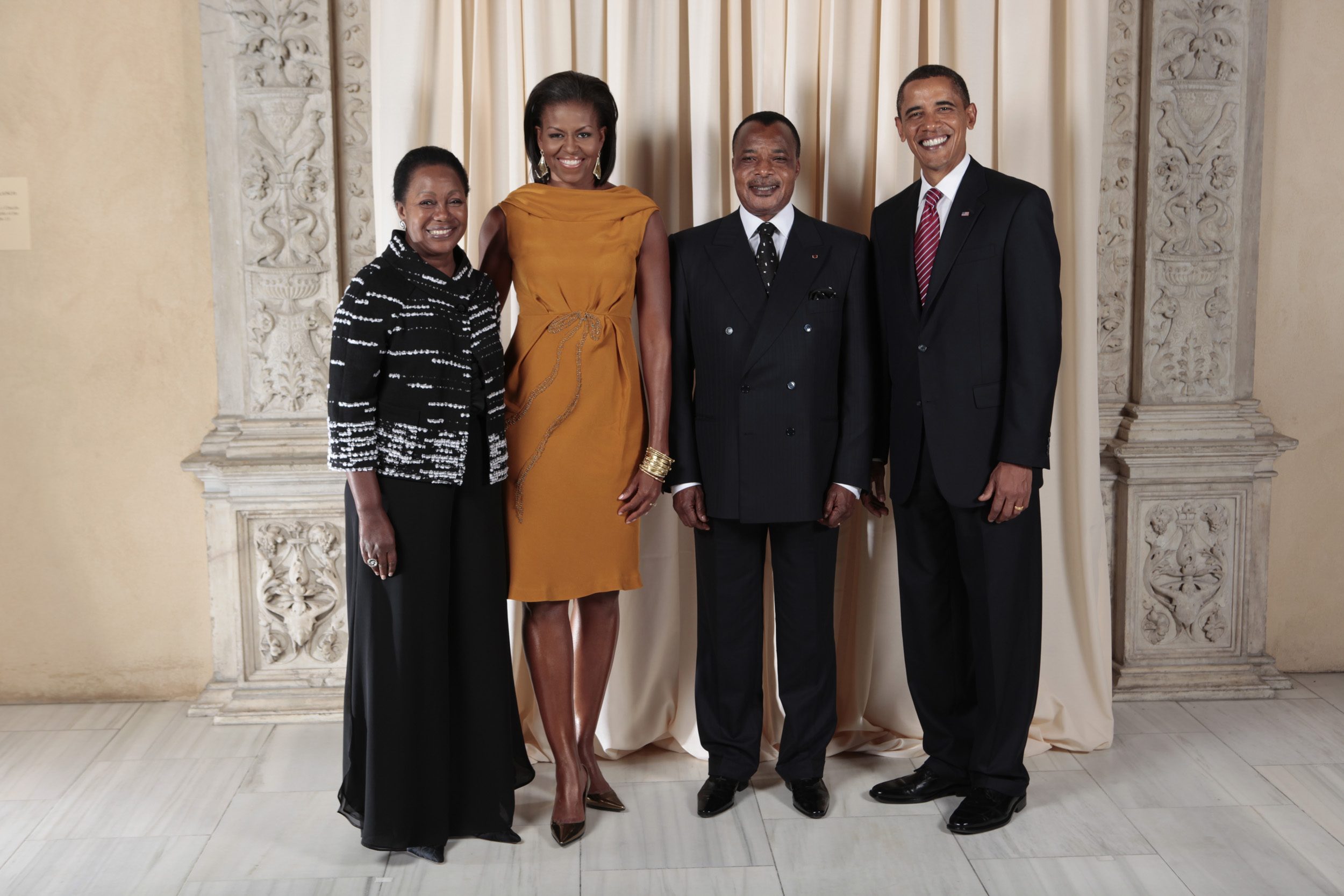

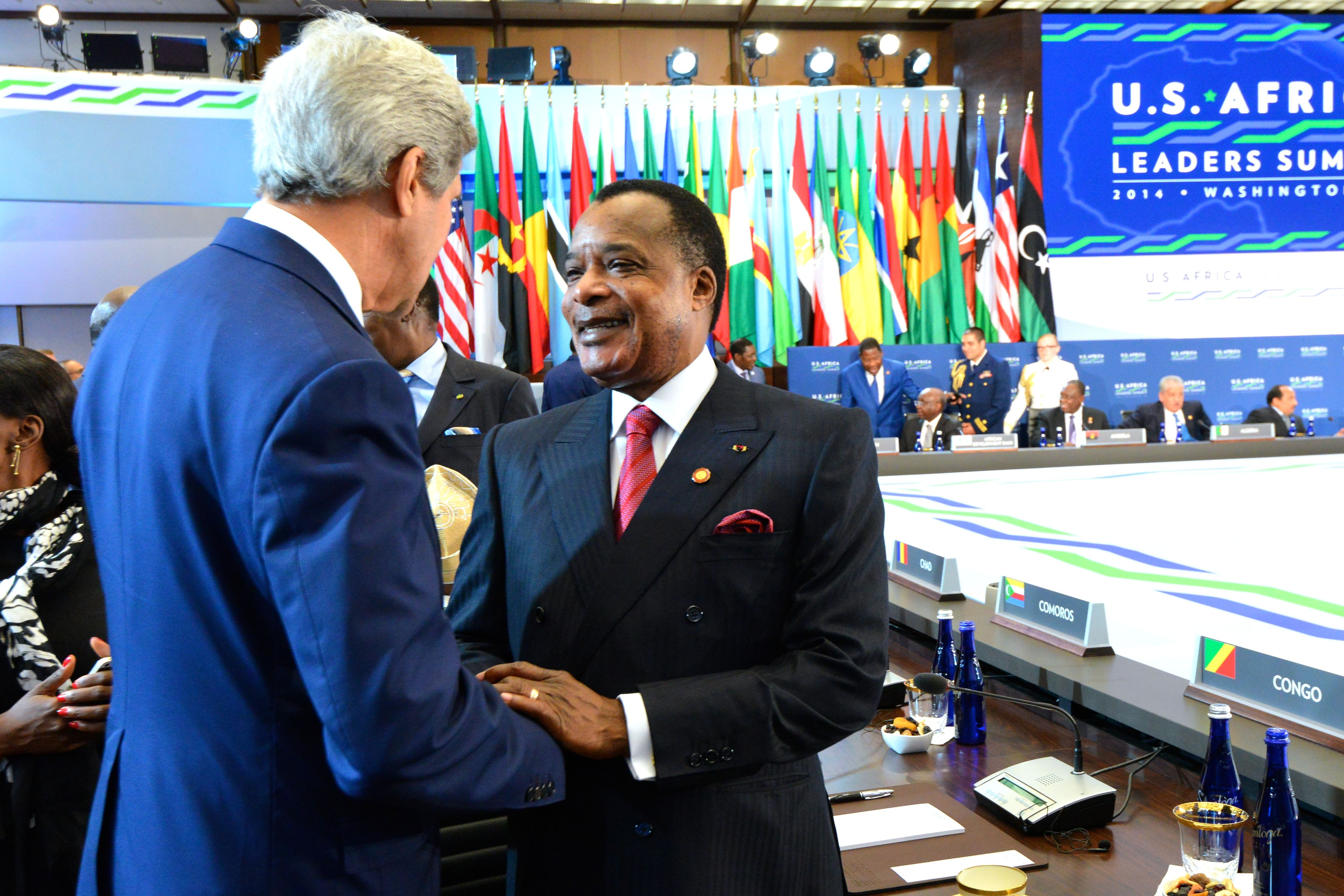

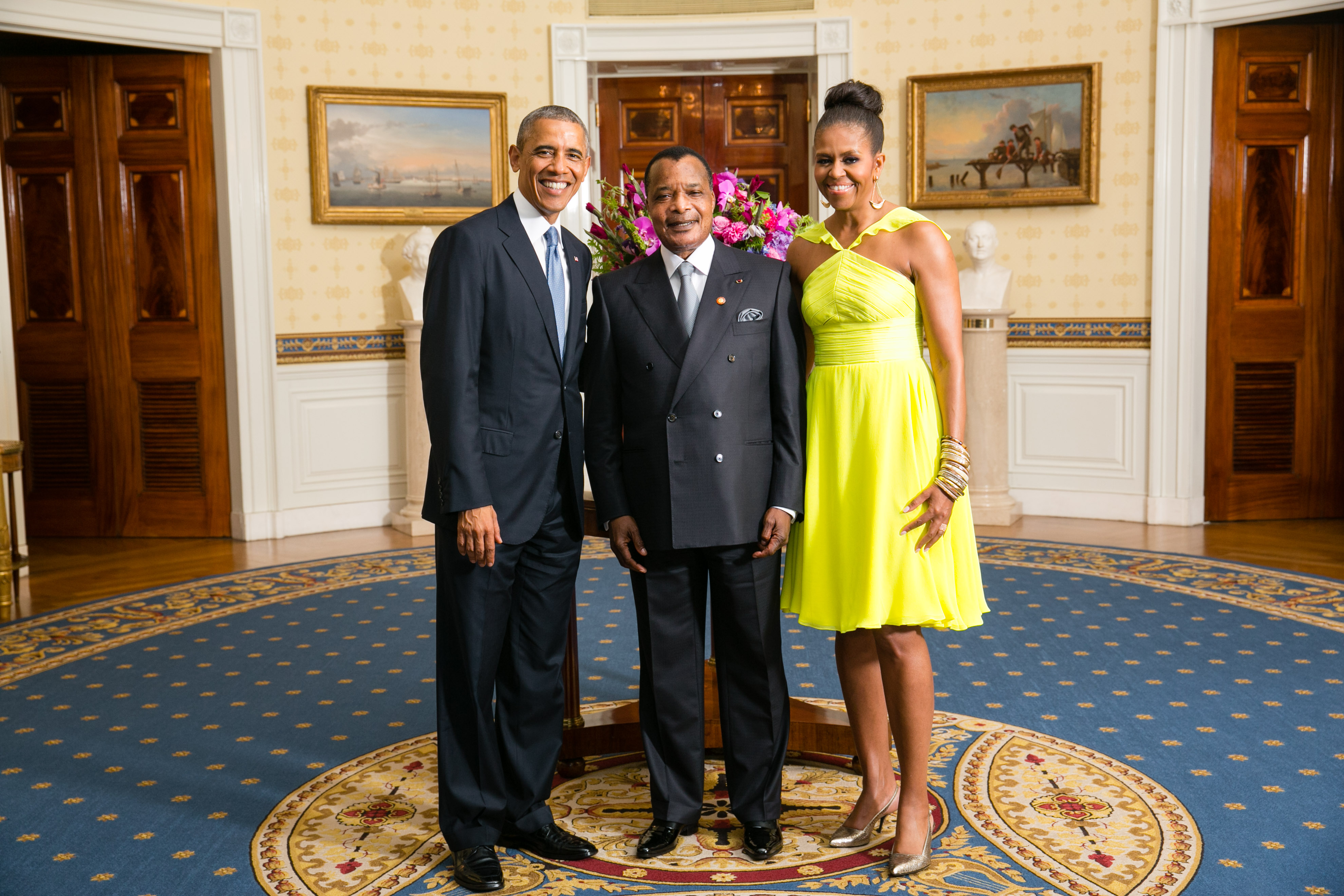

== Djibouti ==
Table of trips
Dates	Guest	Title	Reason
September 27, 1977	Hassan Gouled Aptidon	President	Private visit
April 23–25, 1991	Hassan Gouled Aptidon	President	Official working visit
September 21, 1999	Ismaïl Omar Guelleh	President	Met with President Clinton during a meeting of the United Nations General Assembly in New York City.
January 19–24, 2003	Ismaïl Omar Guelleh	President	Working visit
May 5, 2014	Ismaïl Omar Guelleh	President	Met with President Obama at the Oval Office.
August 4–6, 2014	Ismaïl Omar Guelleh	President	Attended the U.S.-Africa Leaders' Summit.
December 13–15, 2022	Ismaïl Omar Guelleh	President	Attended the U.S.-Africa Leaders' Summit.

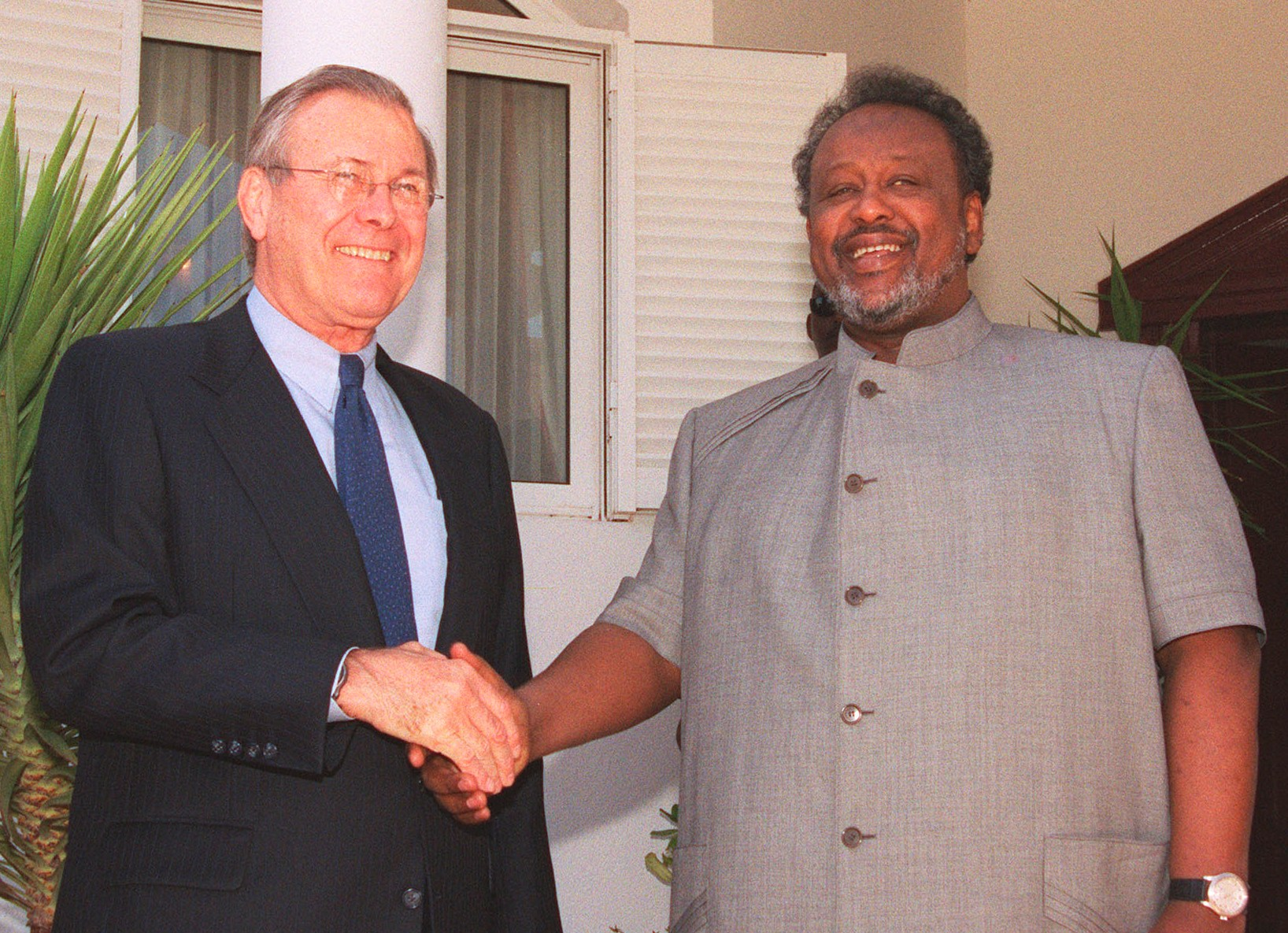

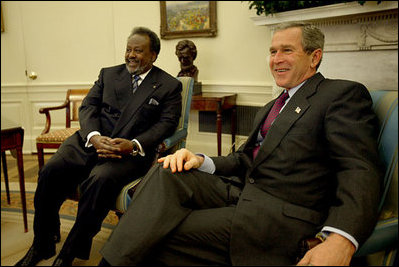

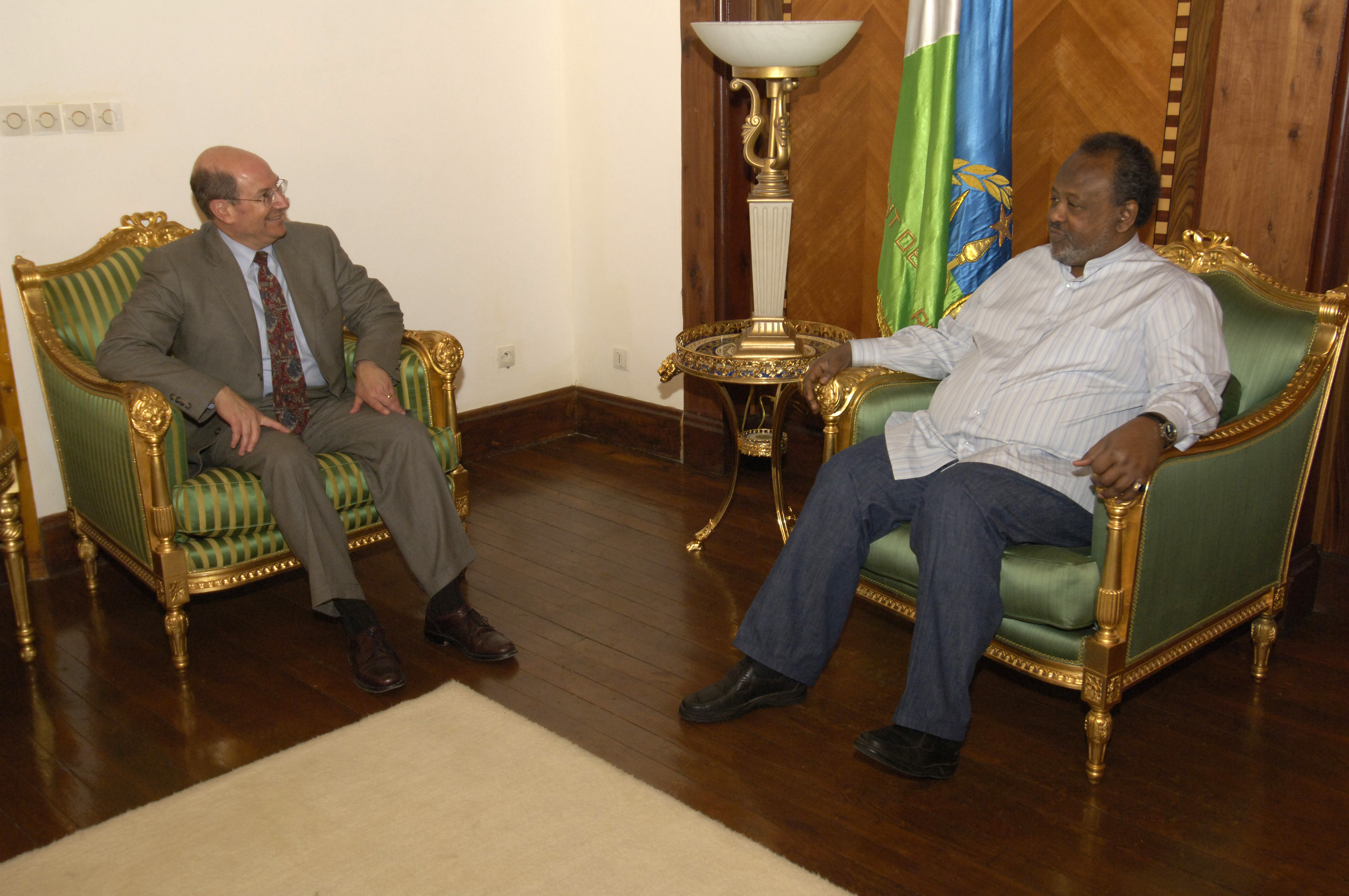

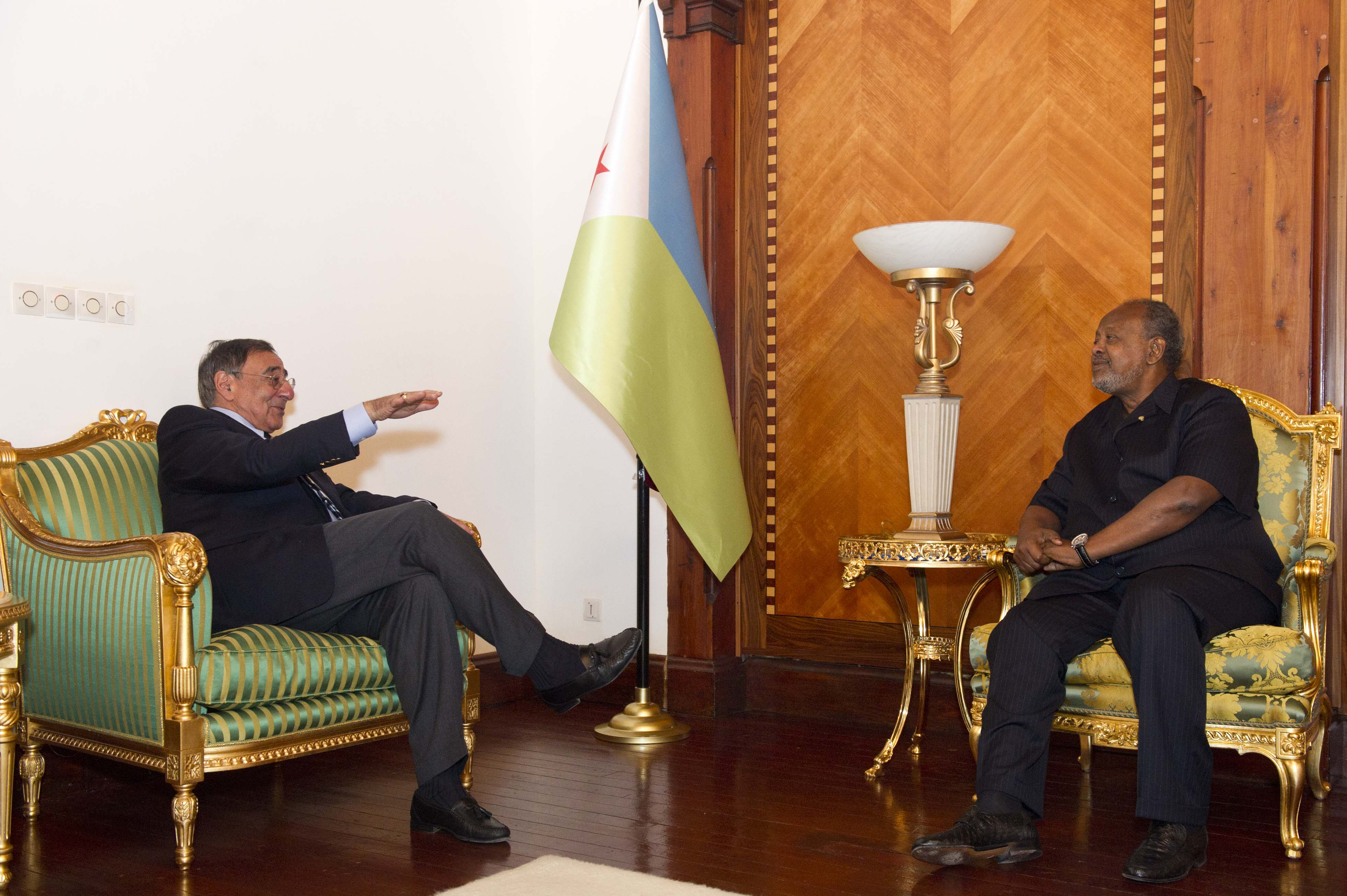

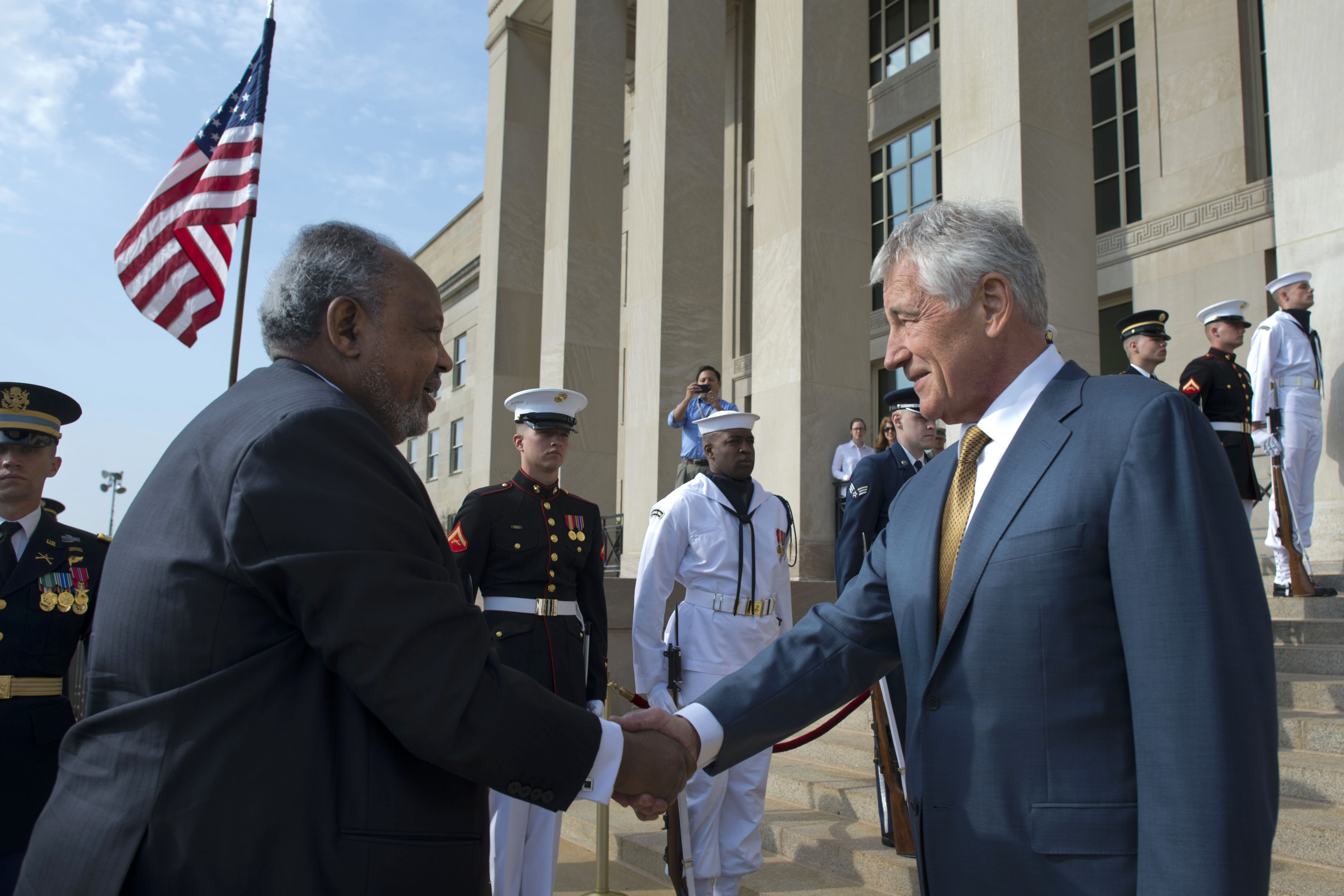

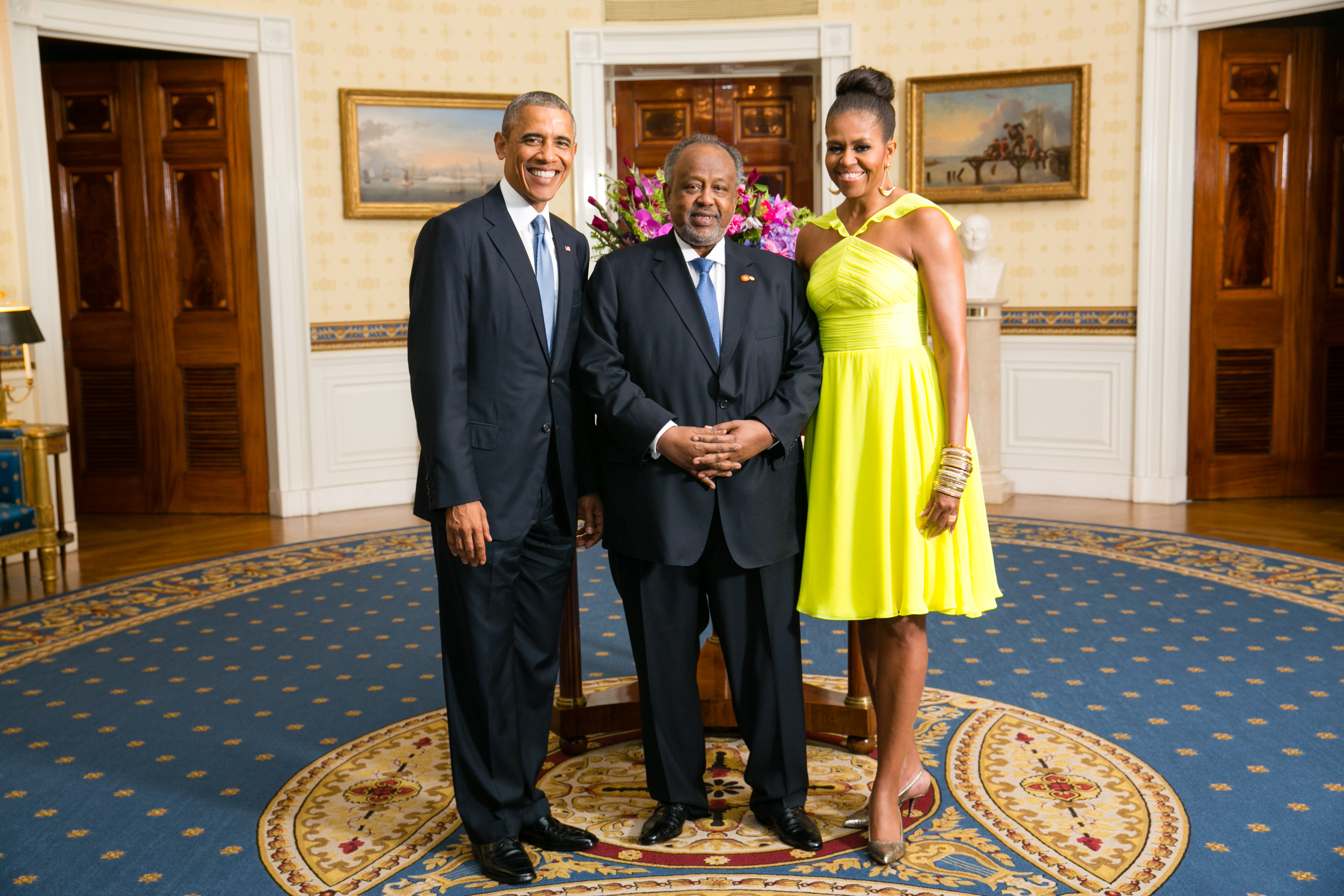

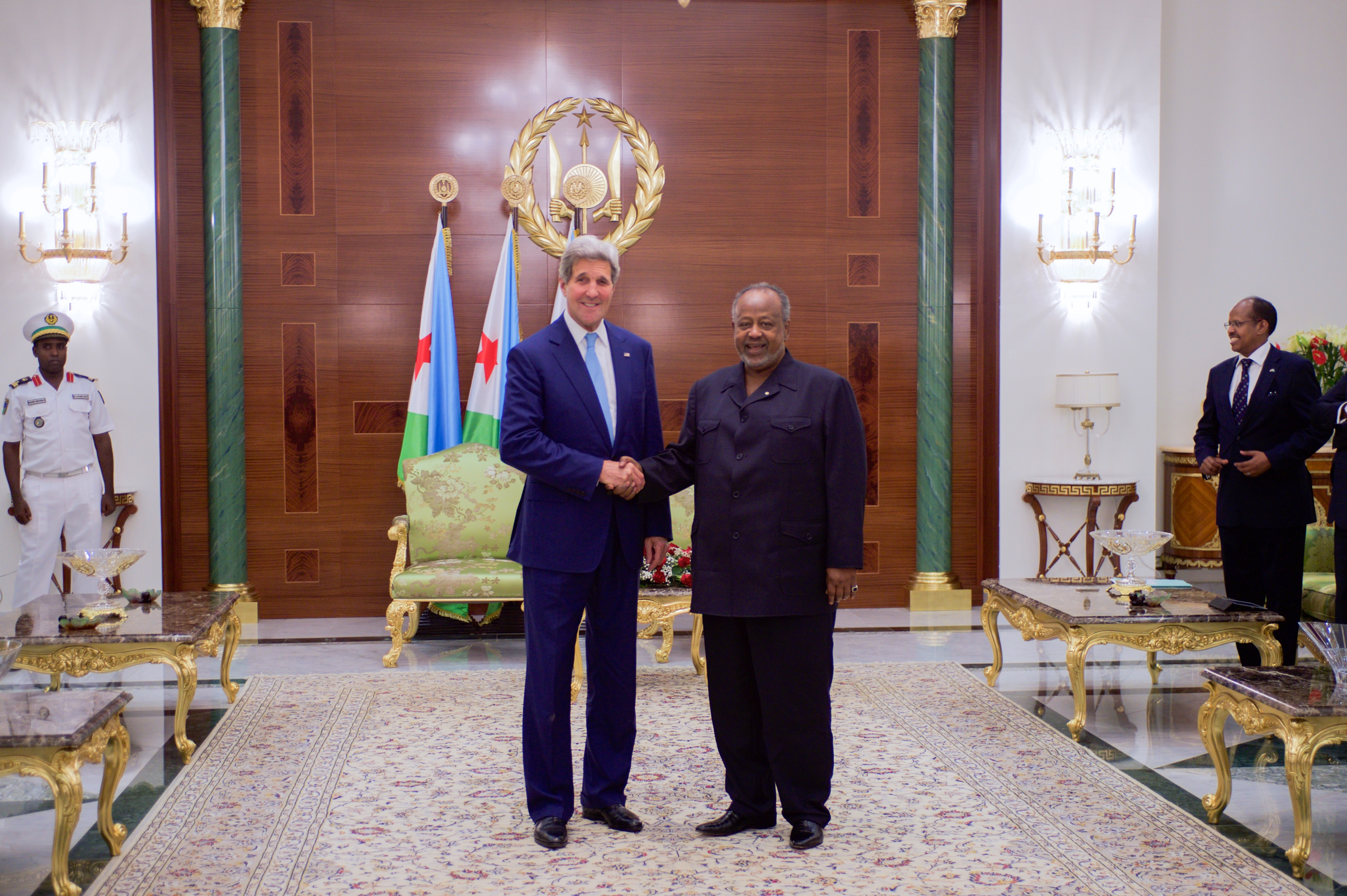

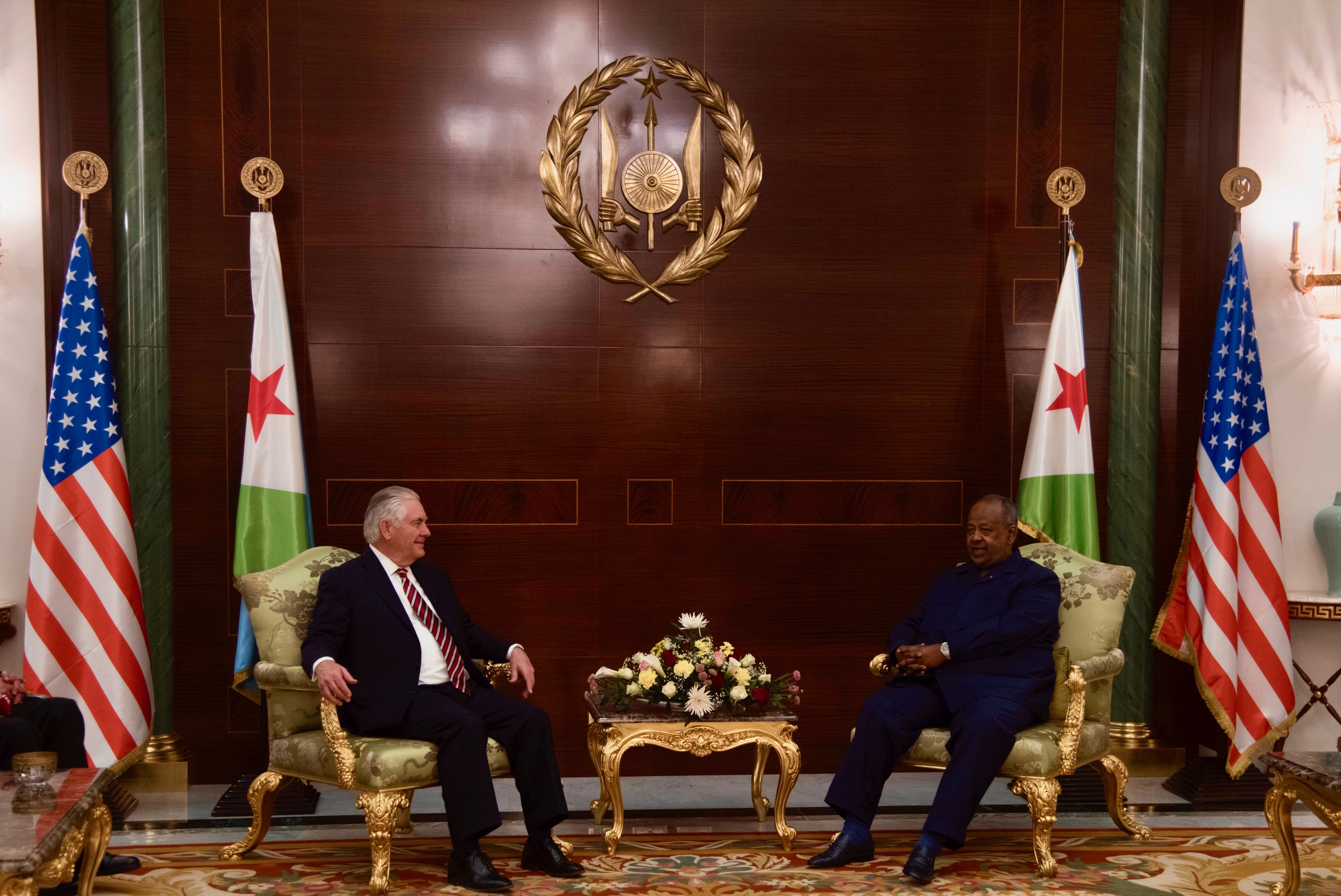

== Egypt ==
Table of trips
Dates	Guest	Title	Reason
September 26, 1960	Gamal Abdel Nasser	President	Met with President Eisenhower in New York City while attending a United Nations General Assembly session.
October 27 – November 5, 1975	Anwar El Sadat	President	State visit; met with President Ford in Jacksonville, Florida on November 2. Addressed a joint session of U.S. Congress on November 5. Also visited Williamsburg, New York City, Chicago, and Houston.
April 3–6, 1977	Anwar El Sadat	President	Official working visit
February 3–8, 1978	Anwar El Sadat	President	Official visit
September 5–19, 1978	Anwar El Sadat	President	See also: Camp David Accords Official visit. Met with President Carter and Israeli Prime Minister Menachem Begin at Camp David.
December 1, 1978	Mustafa Khalil	Prime Minister	Private visit to discuss progress of peace negotiations between Egypt and Israel.
February 20–25, 1979	Mustafa Khalil	Prime Minister	Official visit. Second meeting with President Carter and Israeli Prime Minister Menachem Begin at Camp David regarding the Camp David Accords.
March 24–29, 1979	Anwar El Sadat	President	Official visits. Signed the Egyptian-Israeli Peace Treaty on March 26.
March 24–29, 1979	Mustafa Khalil	Prime Minister	Official visits. Signed the Egyptian-Israeli Peace Treaty on March 26.
April 7–10, 1980	Anwar El Sadat	President	Official visit
August 4–9, 1981	Anwar El Sadat	President	State visit; visited New York City.
February 2–5, 1982	Hosni Mubarak	President	State visit
January 26–31, 1983	Hosni Mubarak	President	Official working visit
September 29 – October 3, 1983	Hosni Mubarak	President	Official working visit
February 11–15, 1984	Hosni Mubarak	President	Official working visit
March 11–13, 1985	Hosni Mubarak	President	Official working visit
September 21–23, 1985	Hosni Mubarak	President	Private visit; met with President Reagan on September 23. Afterwards visited New York City on September 24–28.
January 26–29, 1988	Hosni Mubarak	President	State visit; visited Dallas on January 30.
April 1–5, 1989	Hosni Mubarak	President	Official visit. Private visit to New York City afterwards.
October 1–3, 1989	Hosni Mubarak	President	Met with President Bush during a private visit.
April 3–6, 1993	Hosni Mubarak	President	Met with President Clinton during a private visit.
October 23–28, 1993	Hosni Mubarak	President	Met with President Clinton during a private visit.
April 1–5, 1995	Hosni Mubarak	President	Official working visit
September 28–30, 1995	Hosni Mubarak	President	Attended the signing of Israeli-Palestinian Interim Agreement.
July 28–31, 1996	Hosni Mubarak	President	Official working visit
March 8–13, 1997	Hosni Mubarak	President	Official working visit
June 26 – July 6, 1999	Hosni Mubarak	President	Official working visit
March 24–30, 2000	Hosni Mubarak	President	Official working visit
March 30 – April 4, 2001	Hosni Mubarak	President	Working visit
March 2–6, 2002	Hosni Mubarak	President	Working visit
June 5–8, 2002	Hosni Mubarak	President	Met with President Bush in Washington, D.C. and Camp David.
April 5–9, 2004	Hosni Mubarak	President	Official select visit. Met with President Bush on April 12 at his Prairie Chapel Ranch in Crawford, Texas.
May 8–17, 2005	Ahmed Nazif	Prime Minister	Working visit
August 17–19, 2009	Hosni Mubarak	President	Working visit
September 1, 2010	Hosni Mubarak	President	Attended Middle East peace talks.
September 26, 2012	Mohamed Morsi	President	Addressed the sixty-seventh session of the United Nations General Assembly in New York City.
August 4–6, 2014	Ibrahim Mahlab	Prime Minister	Attended the U.S.-Africa Leaders' Summit.
September 23, 2014	Abdel Fattah el-Sisi	President	Met with President Obama at the UN General Assembly in New York City.
September 24–29, 2015	Abdel Fattah el-Sisi	President	Addressed the seventieth session of the United Nations General Assembly in New York City on September 28. Met with President Obama. Attended a summit on addressing the Islamic State of Iraq and the Levant on September 29.
April 3, 2017	Abdel Fattah el-Sisi	President	Official Working Visit.
April 8–10, 2019	Abdel Fattah el-Sisi	President	Official Working Visit.
December 13–15, 2022	Abdel Fattah el-Sisi	President	Attended the U.S.-Africa Leaders' Summit.

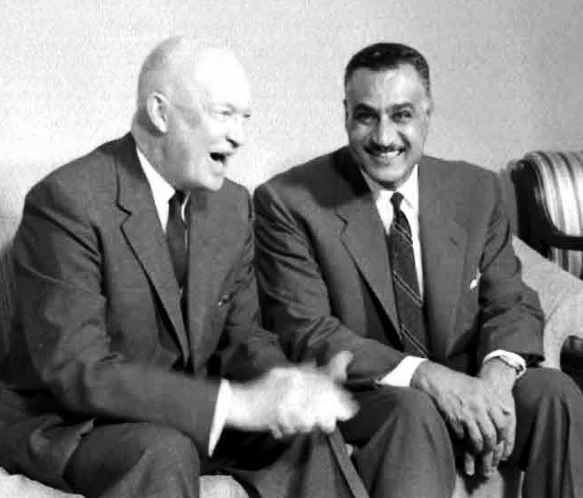

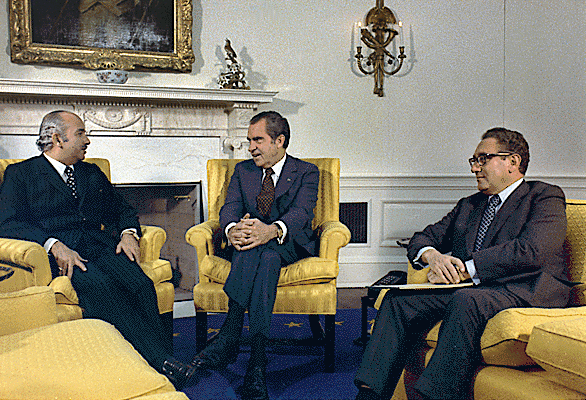

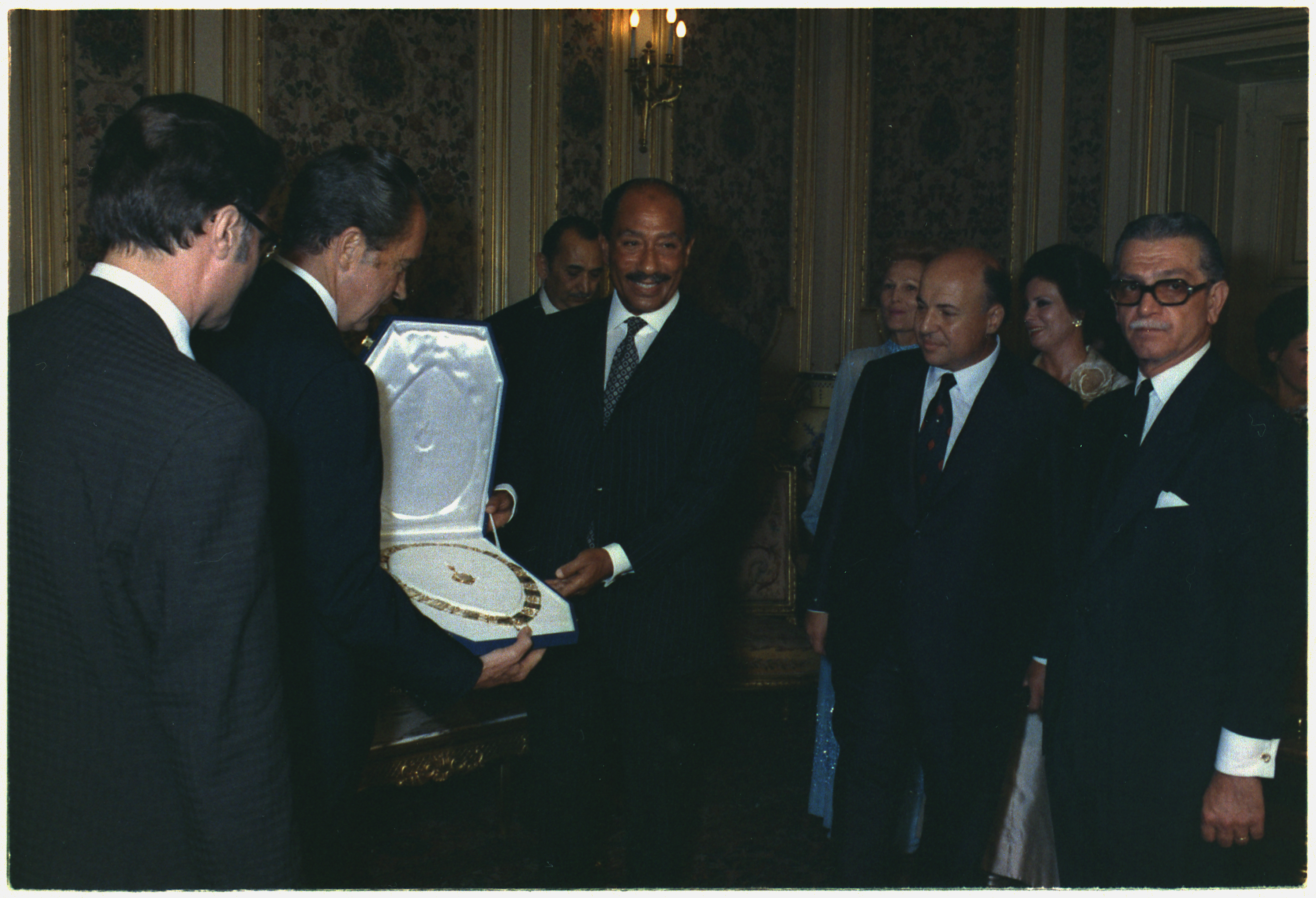

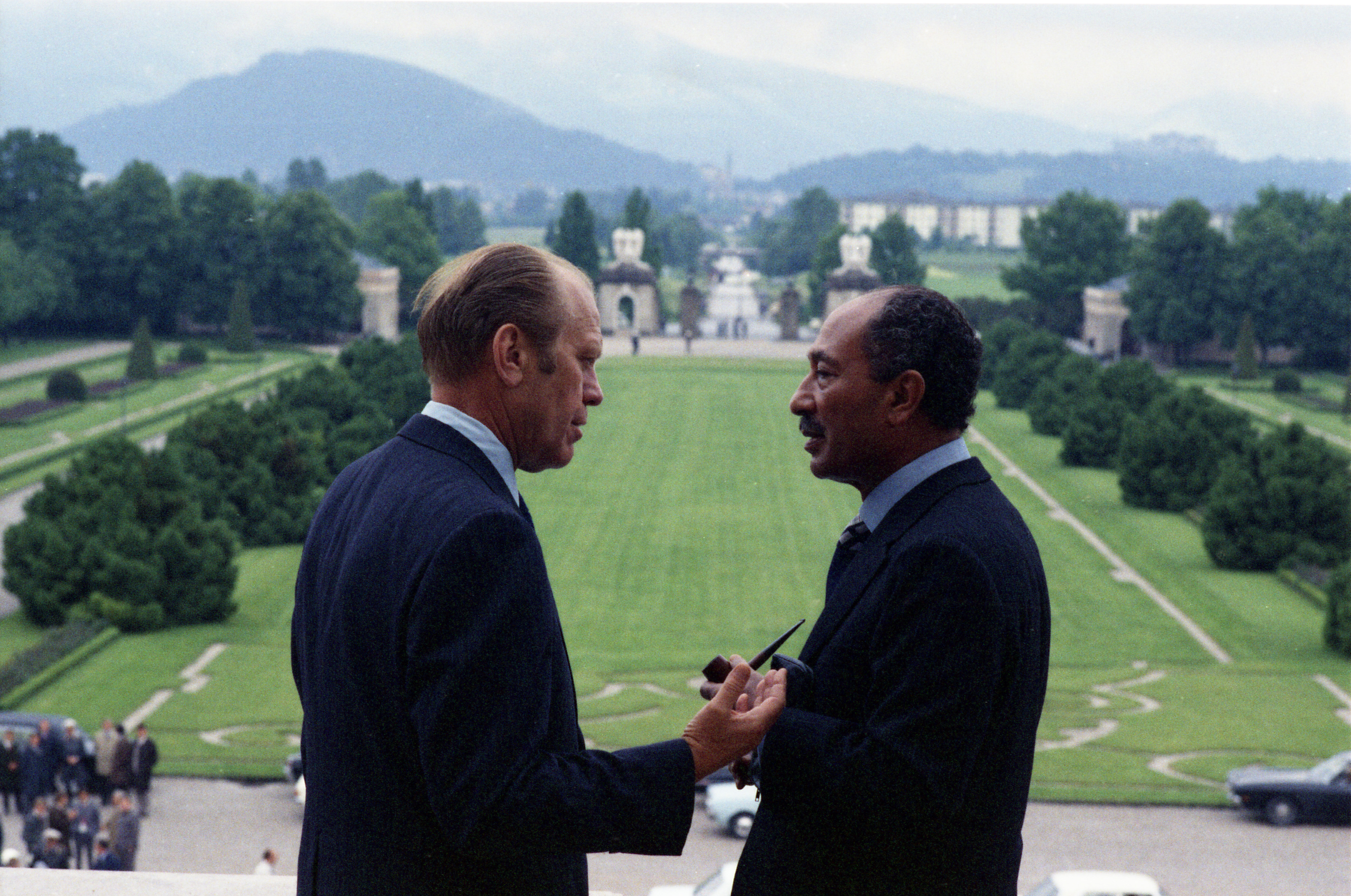

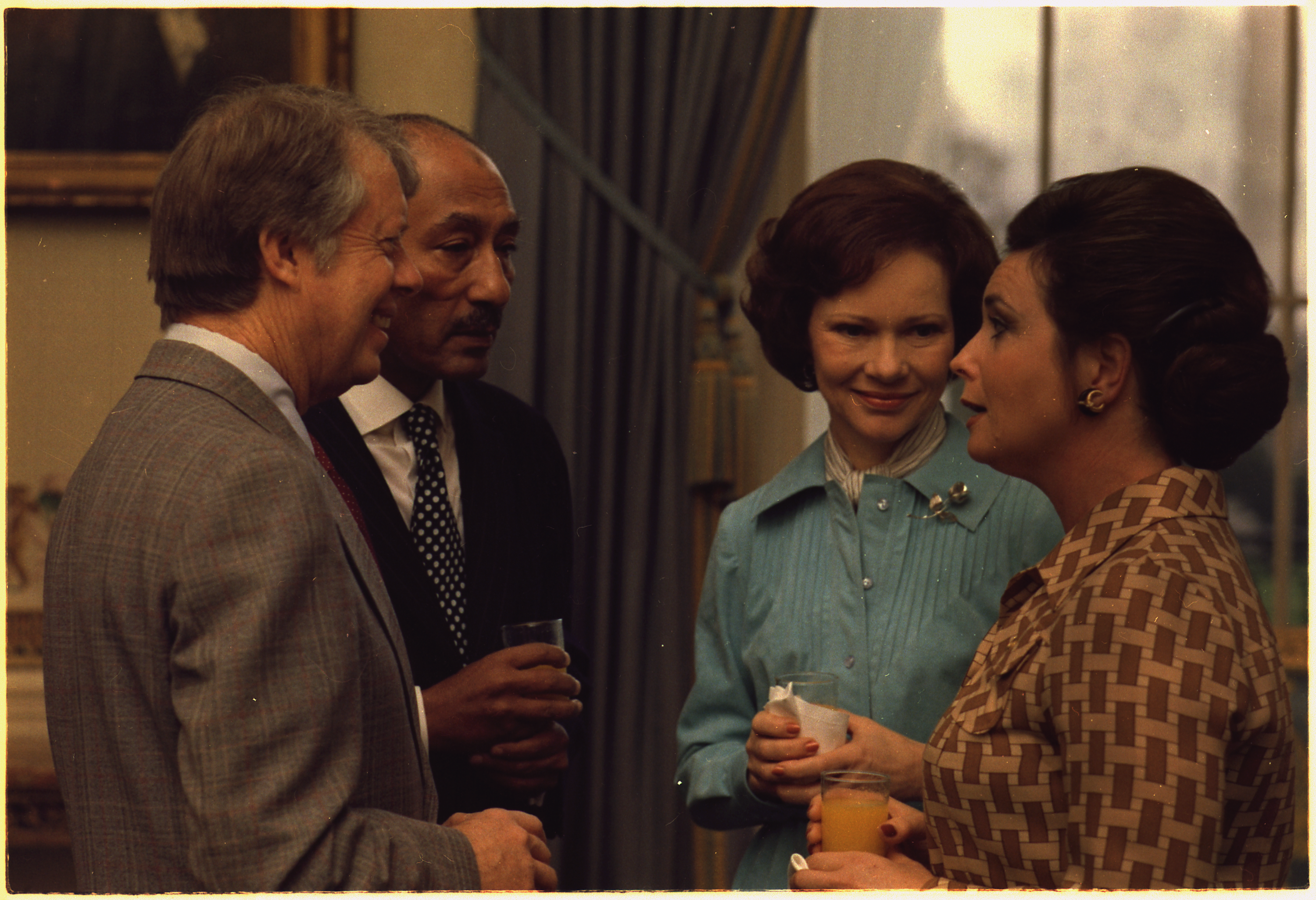

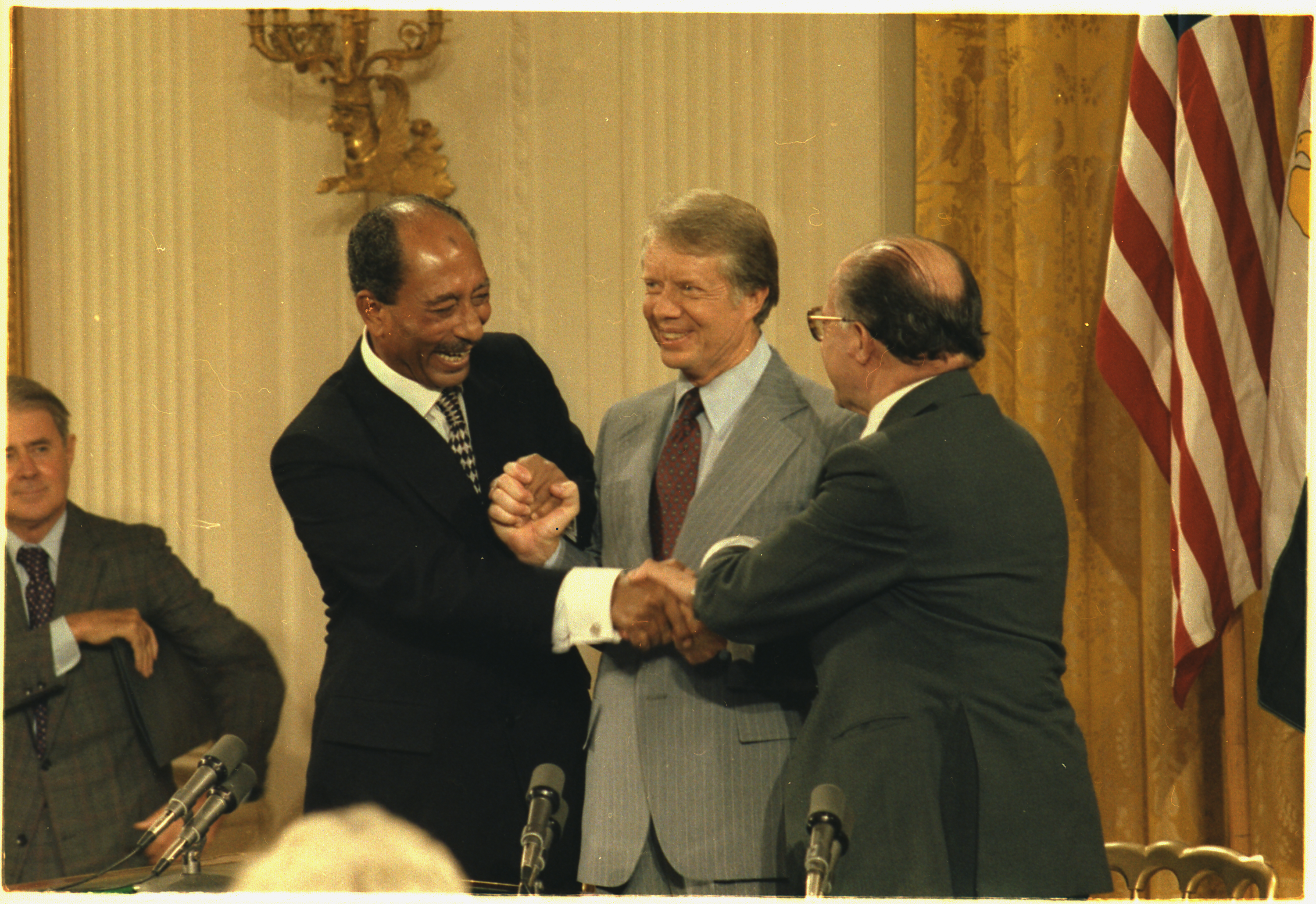

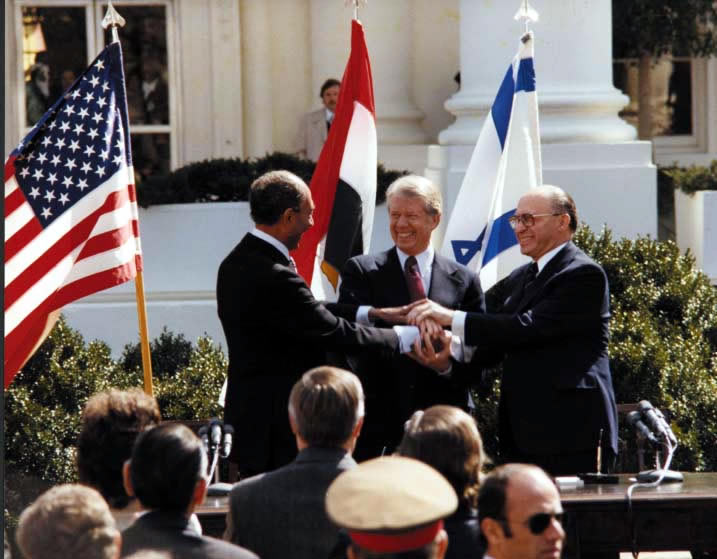

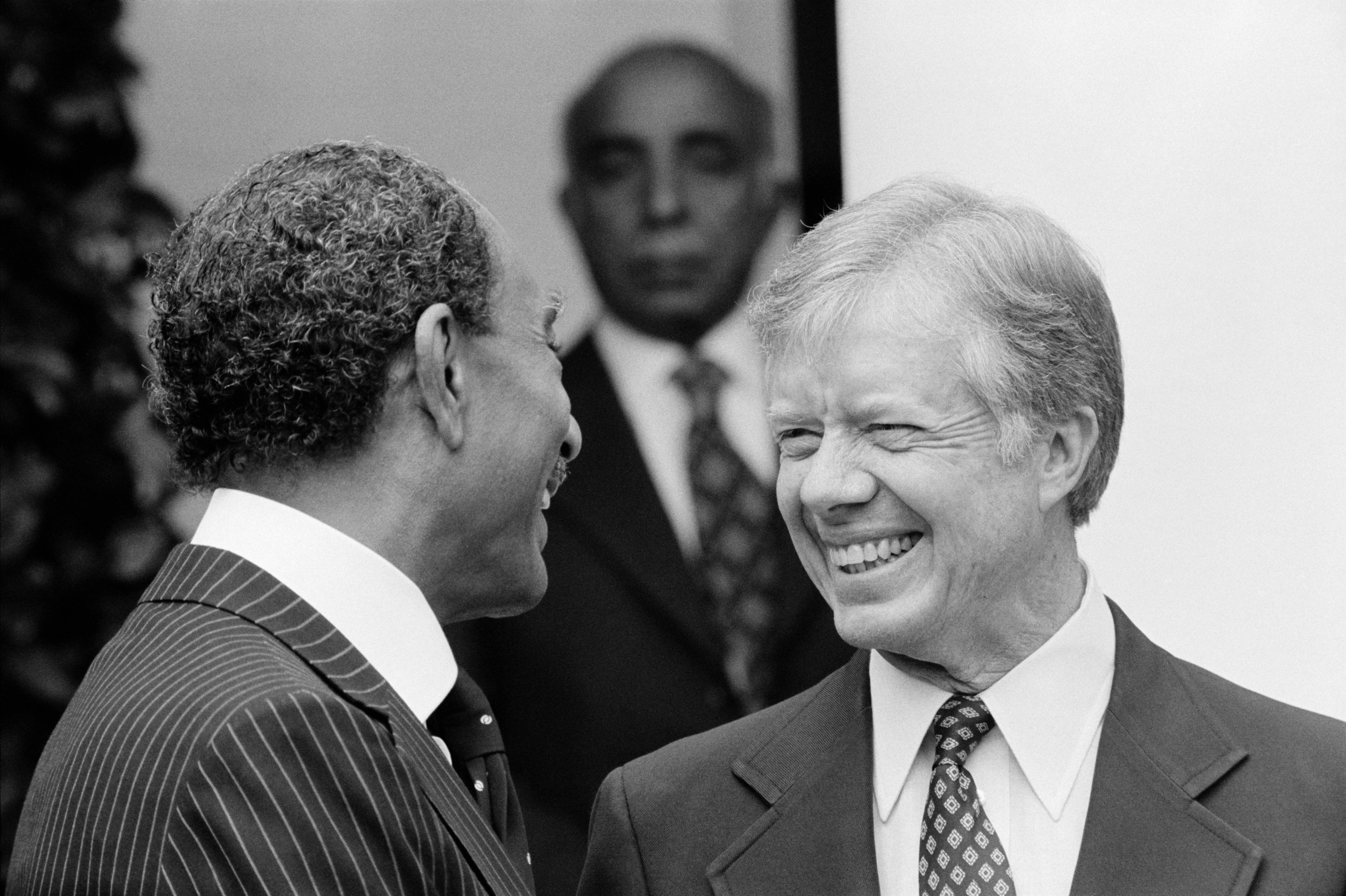

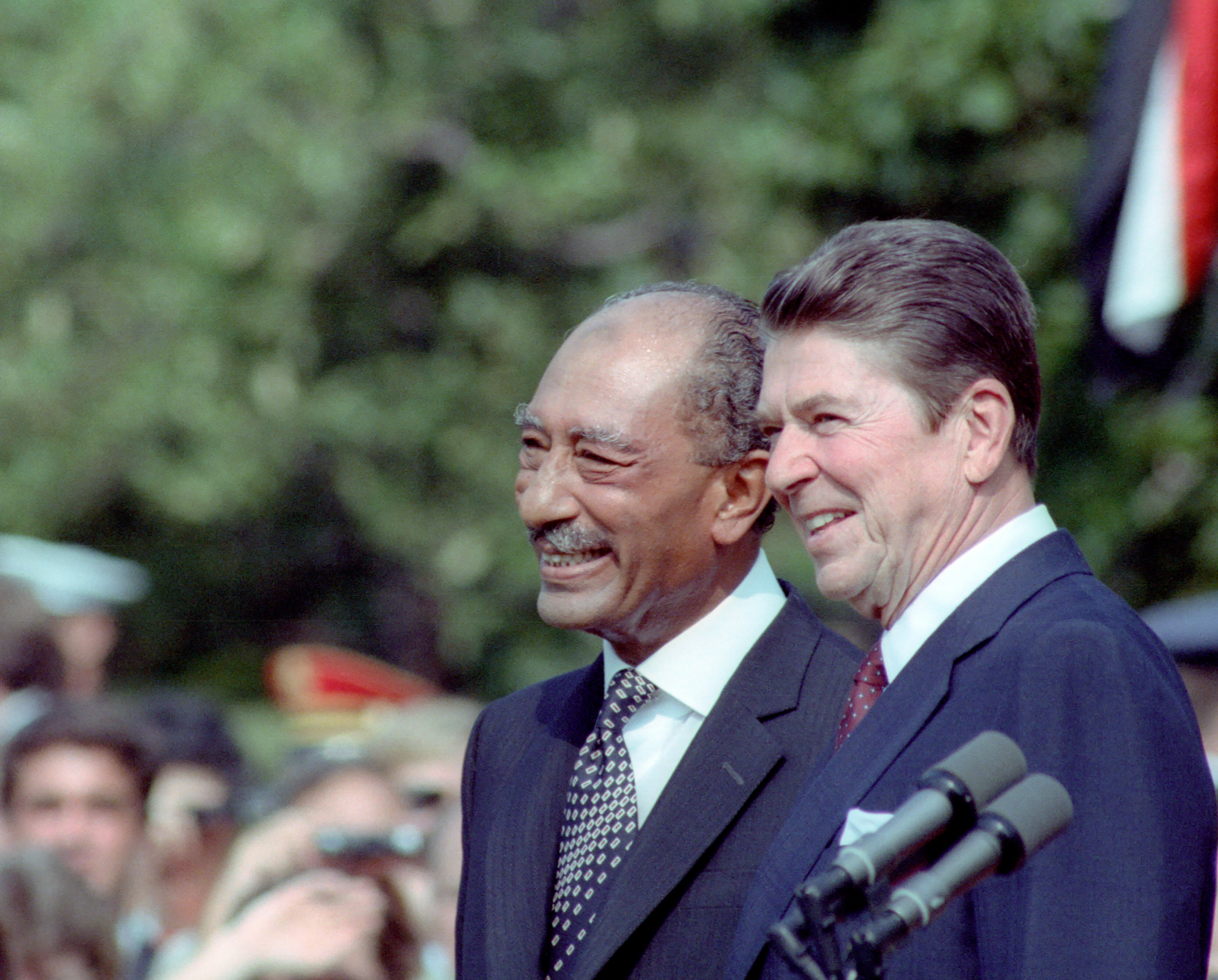

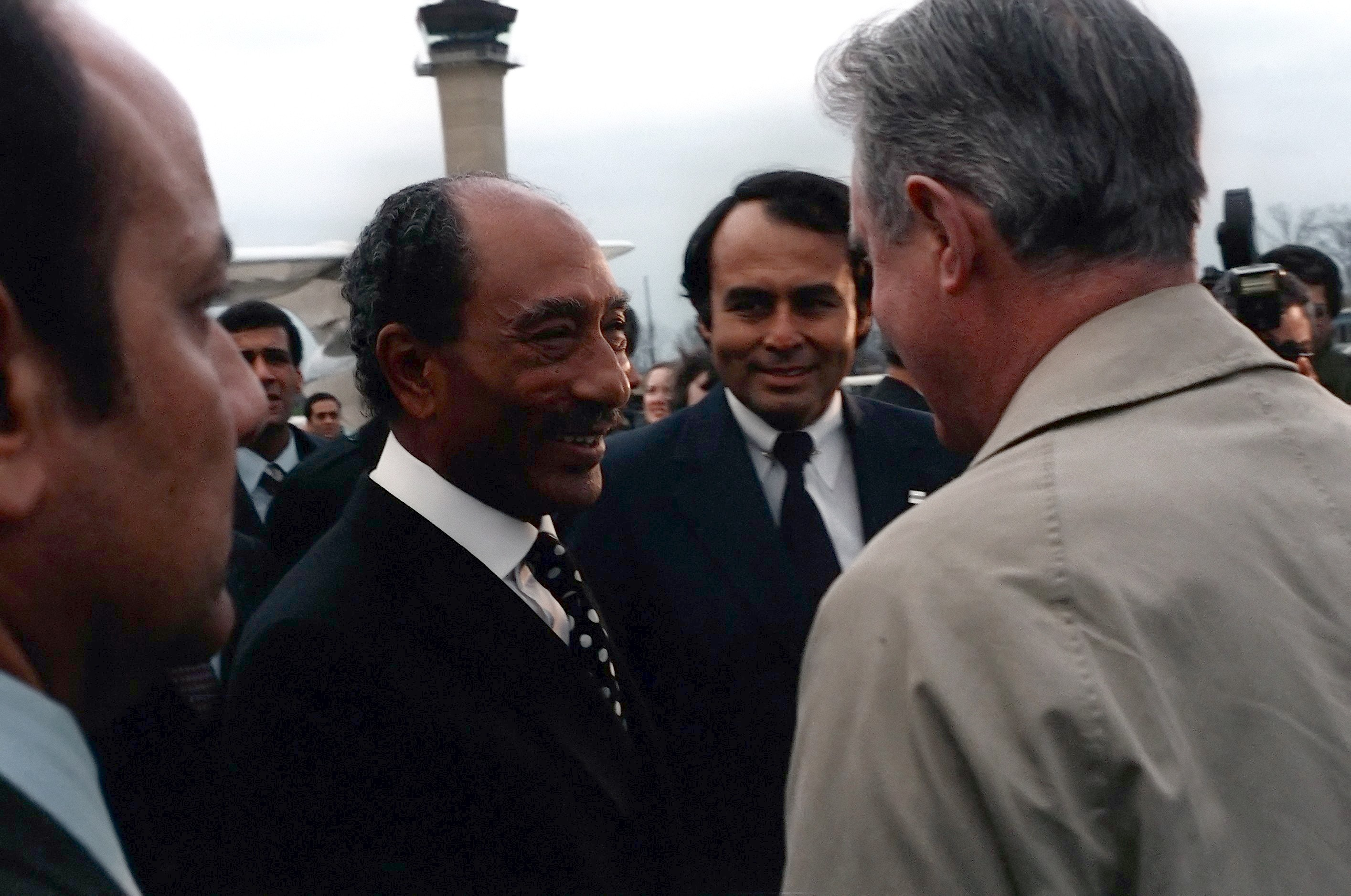

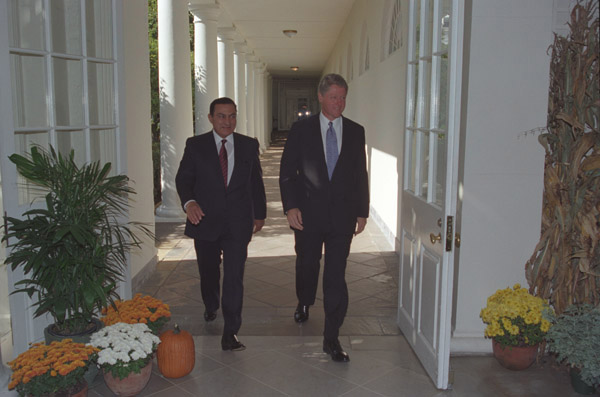

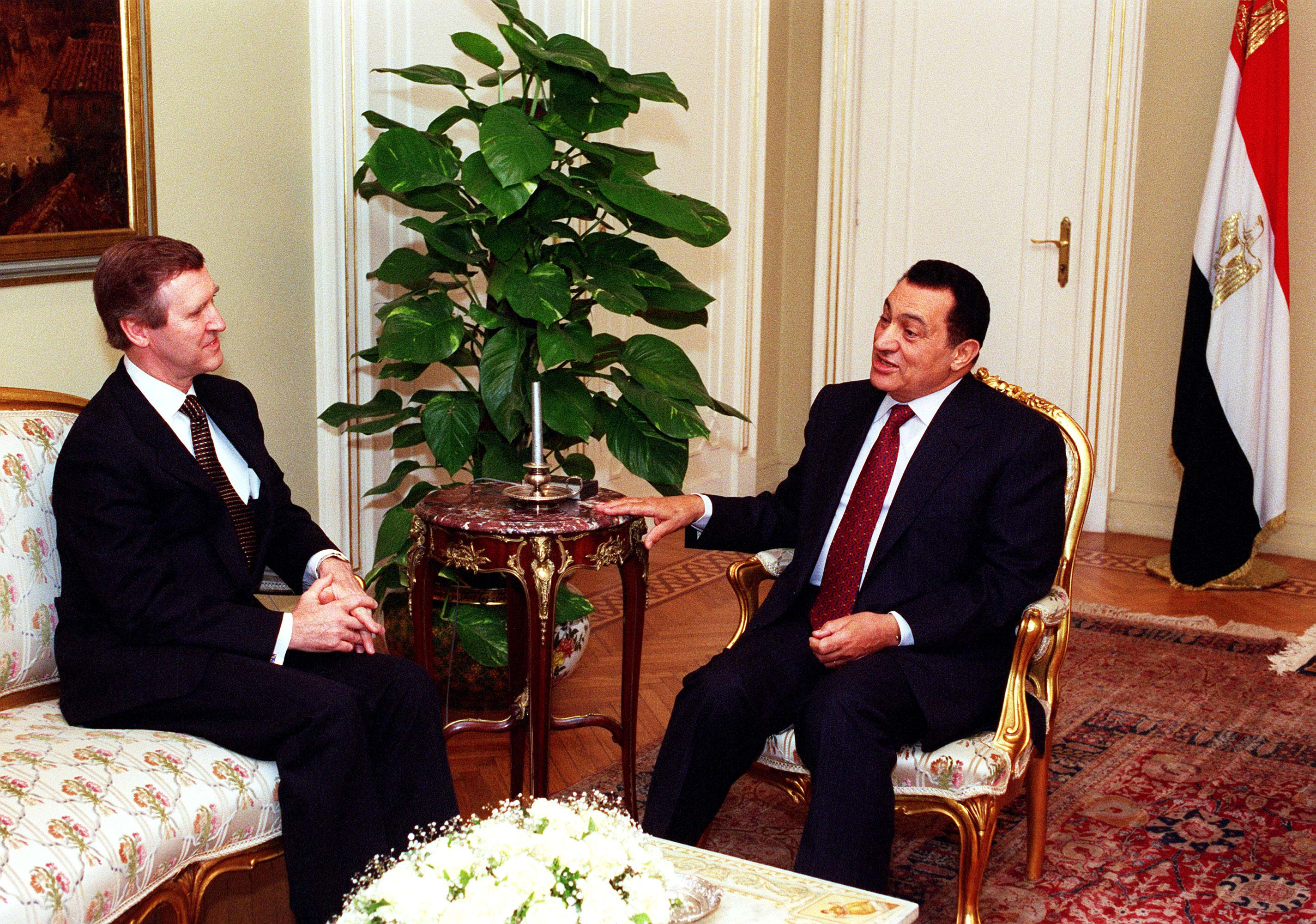

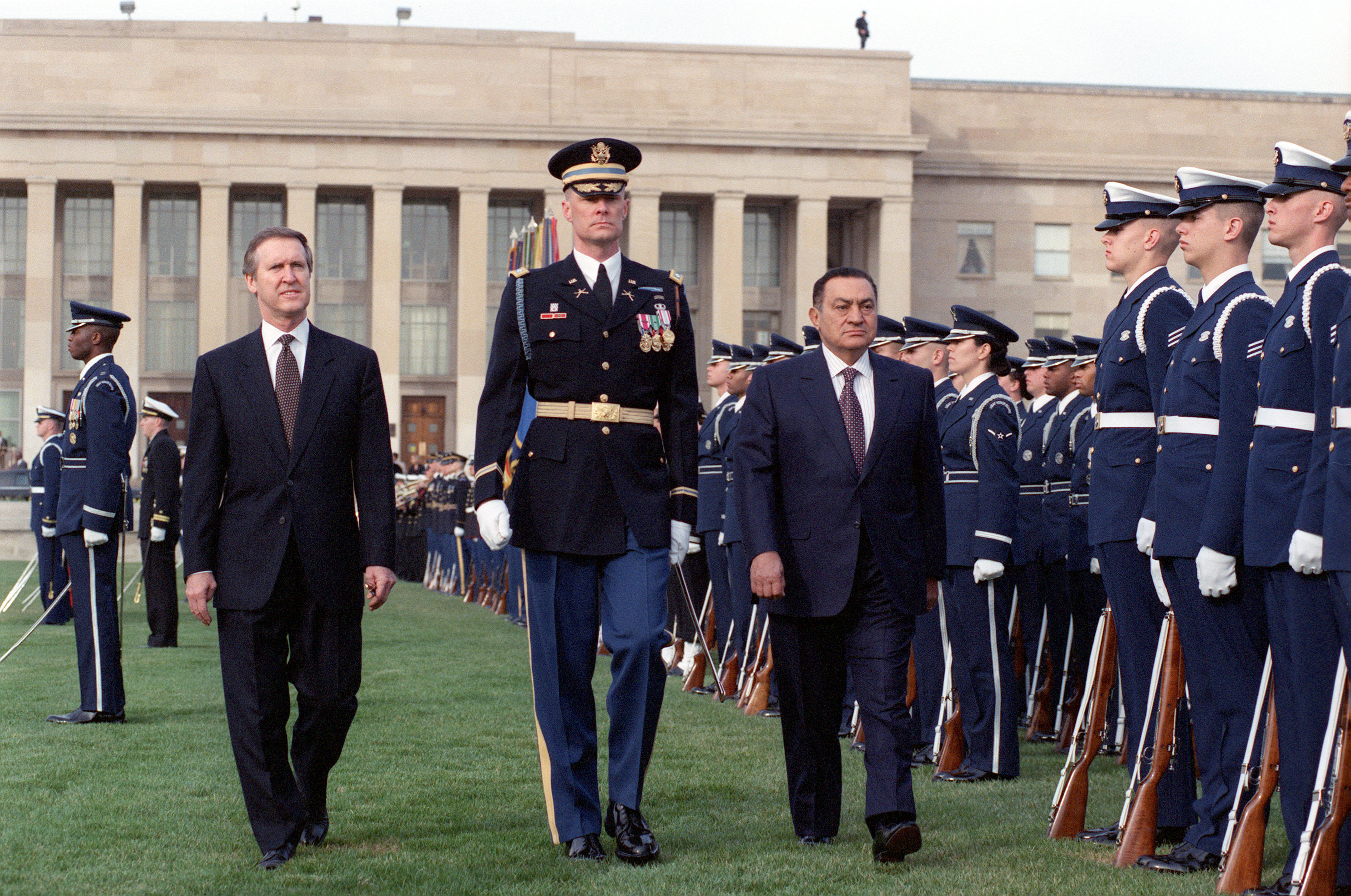

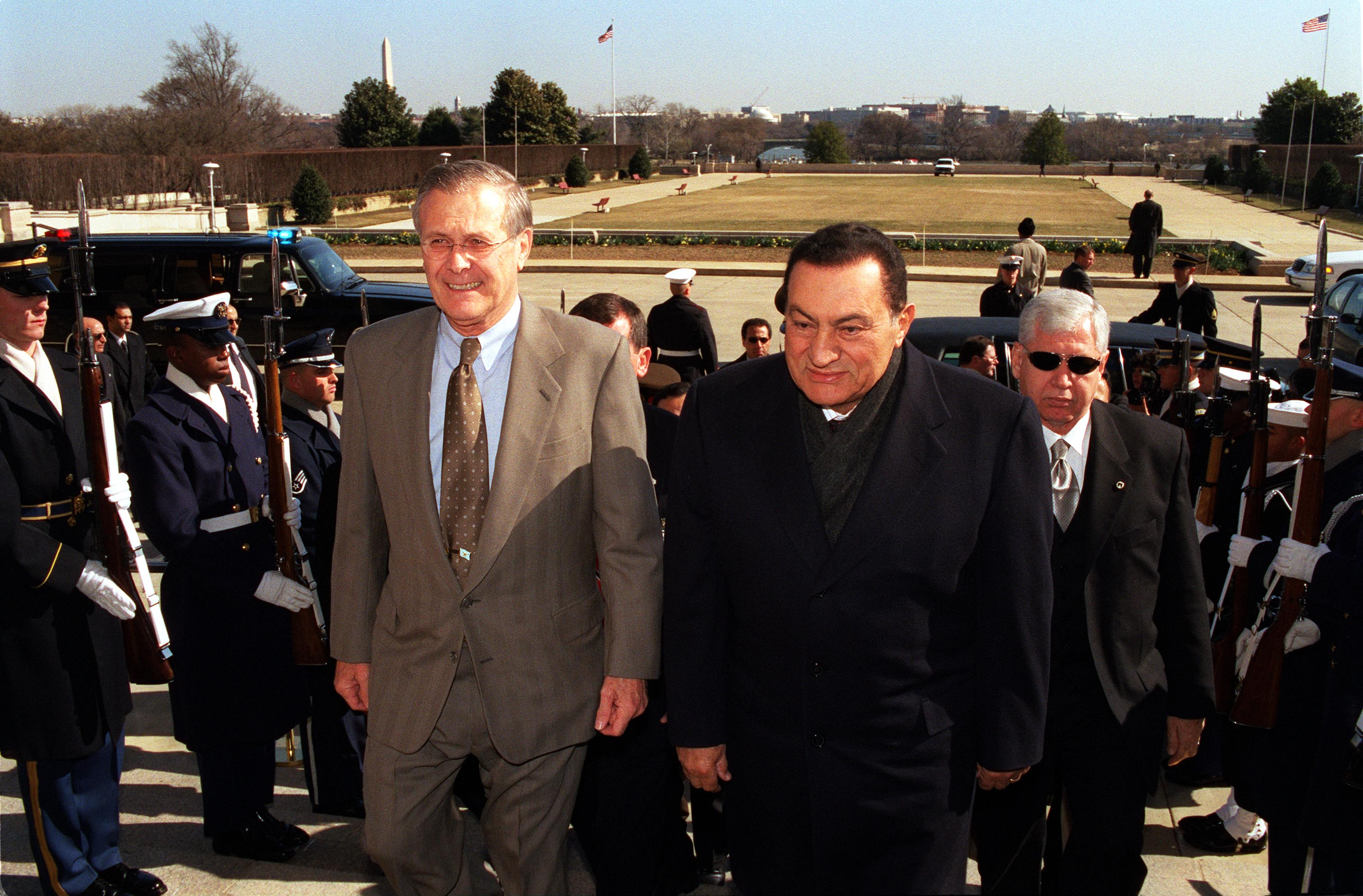

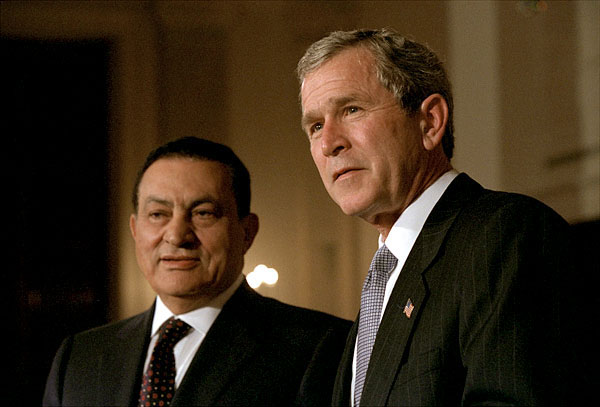

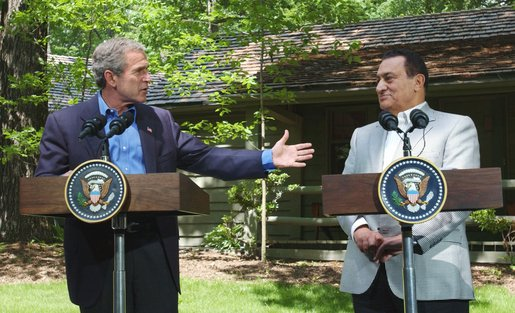

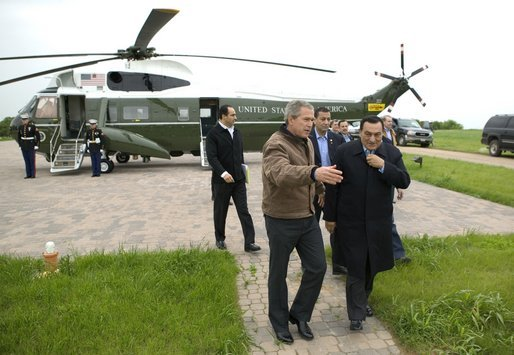

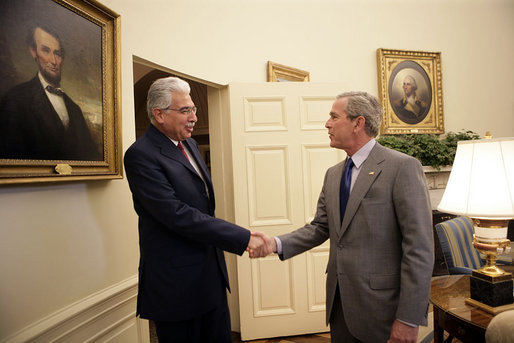

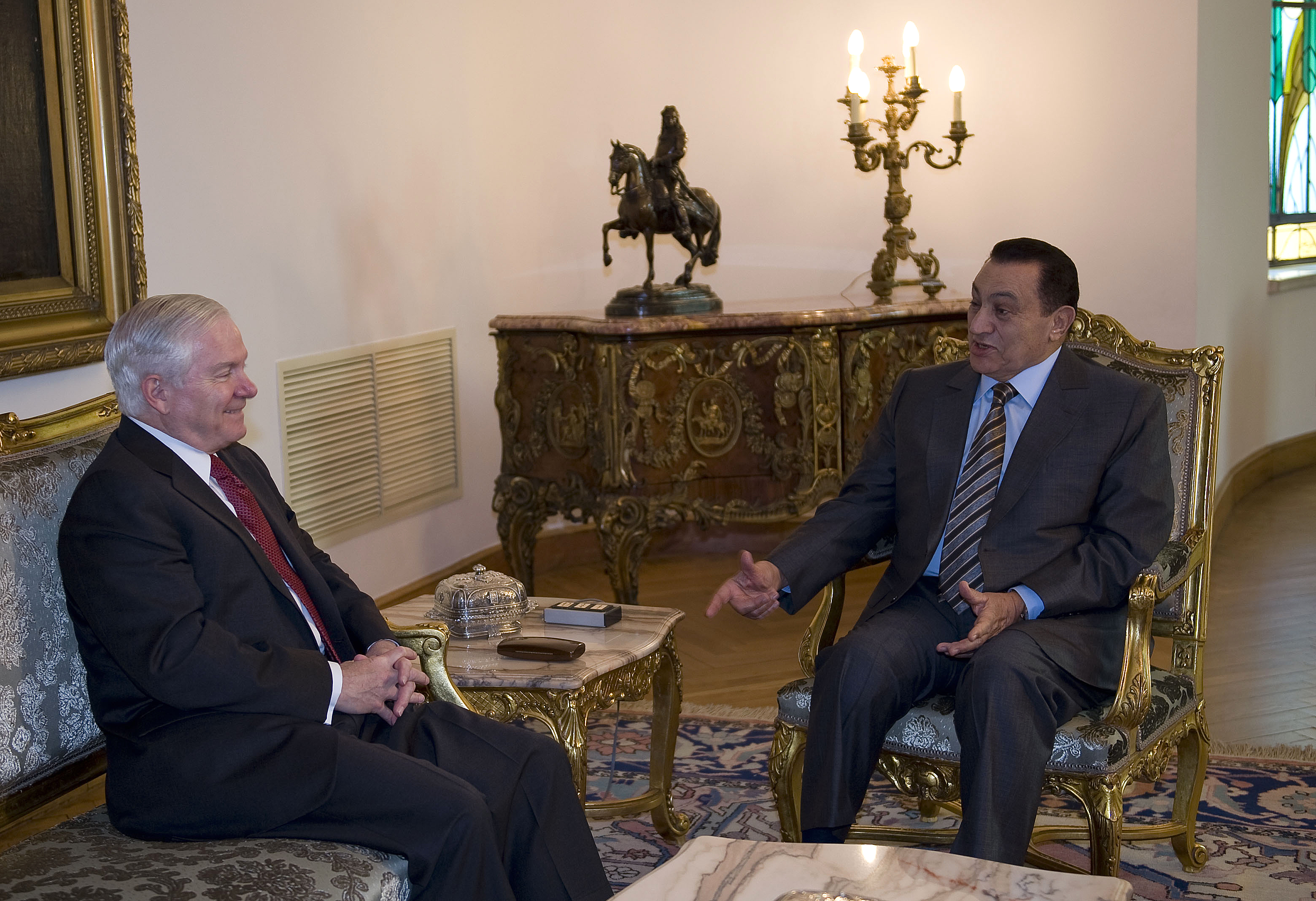

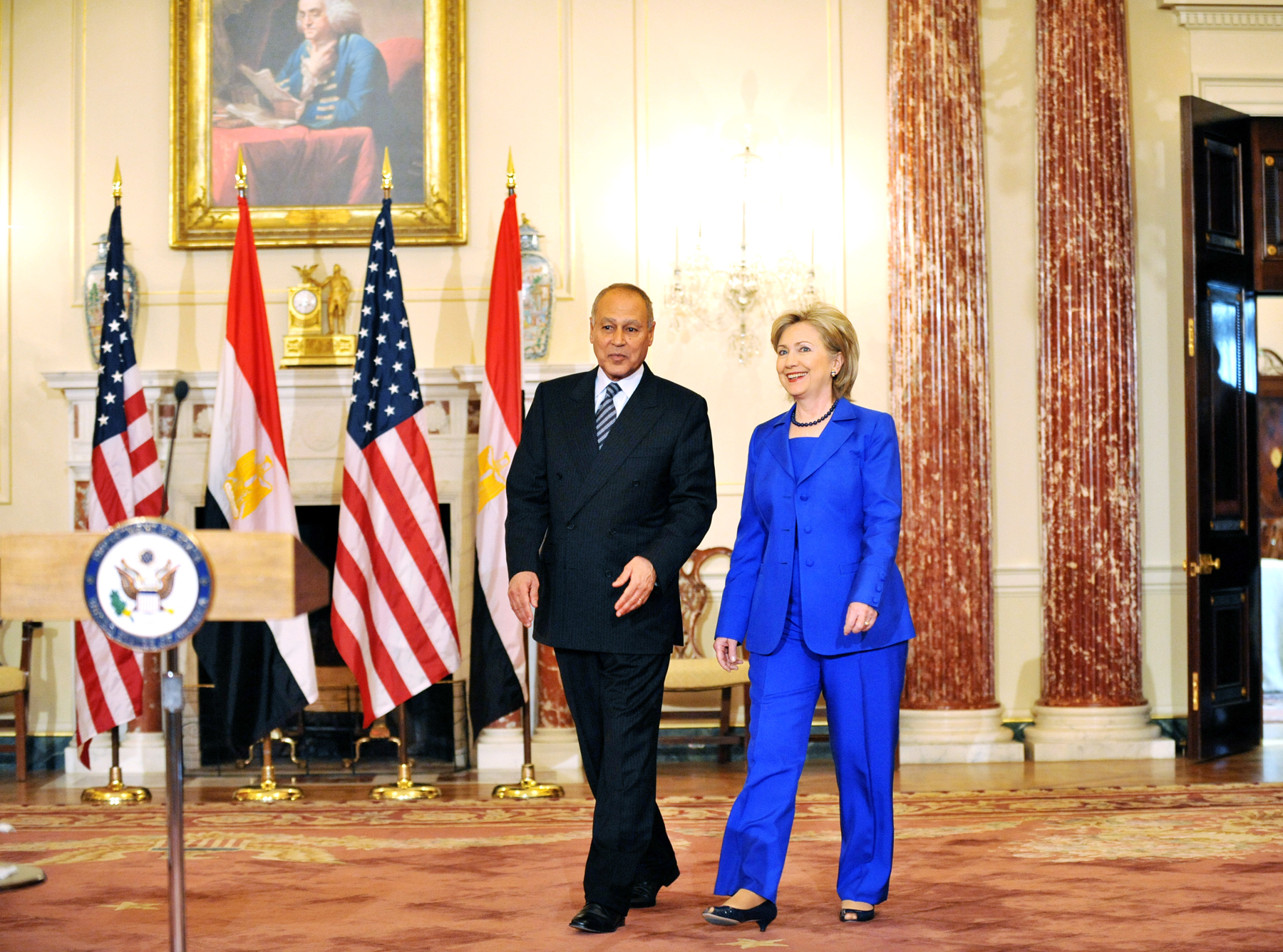

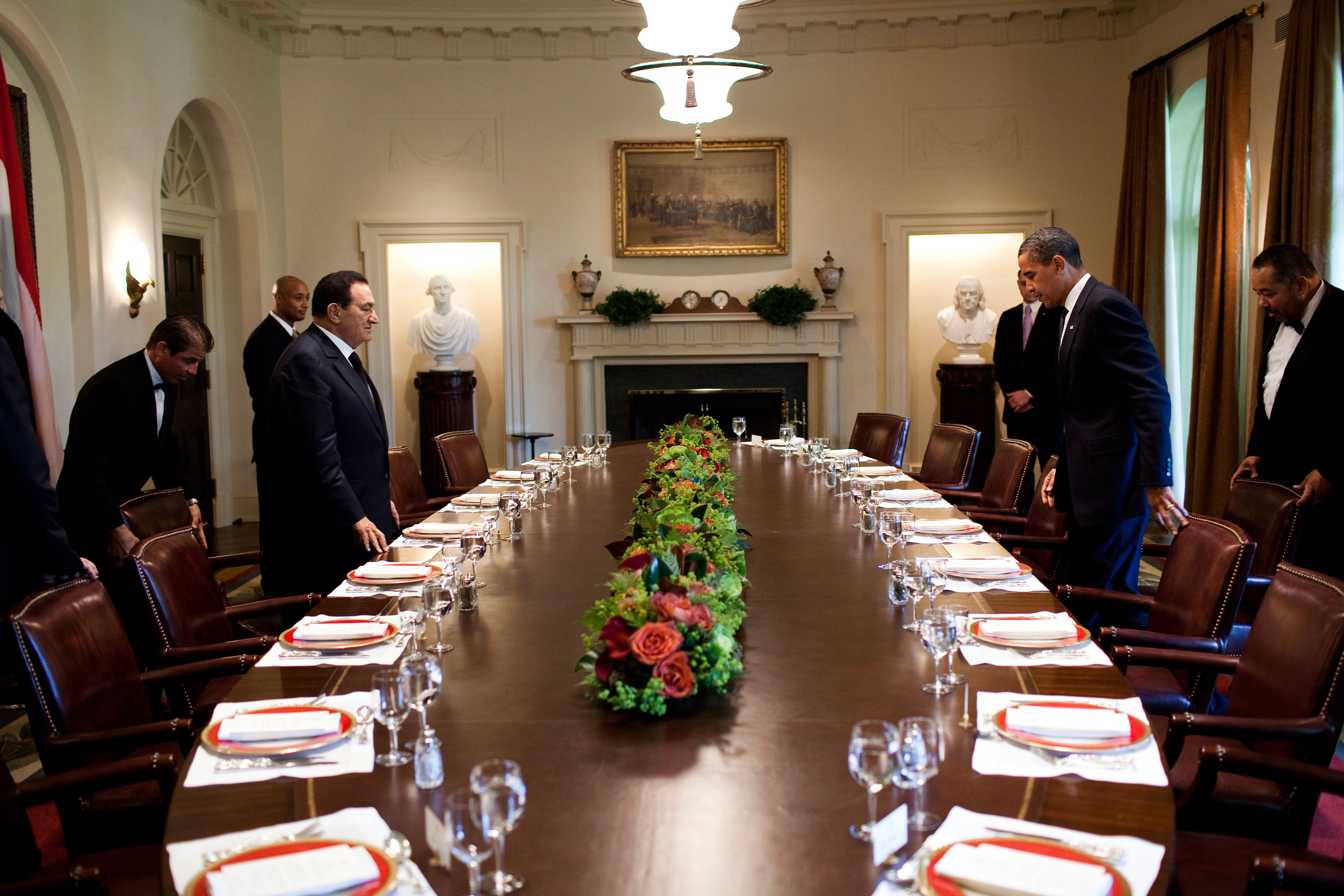

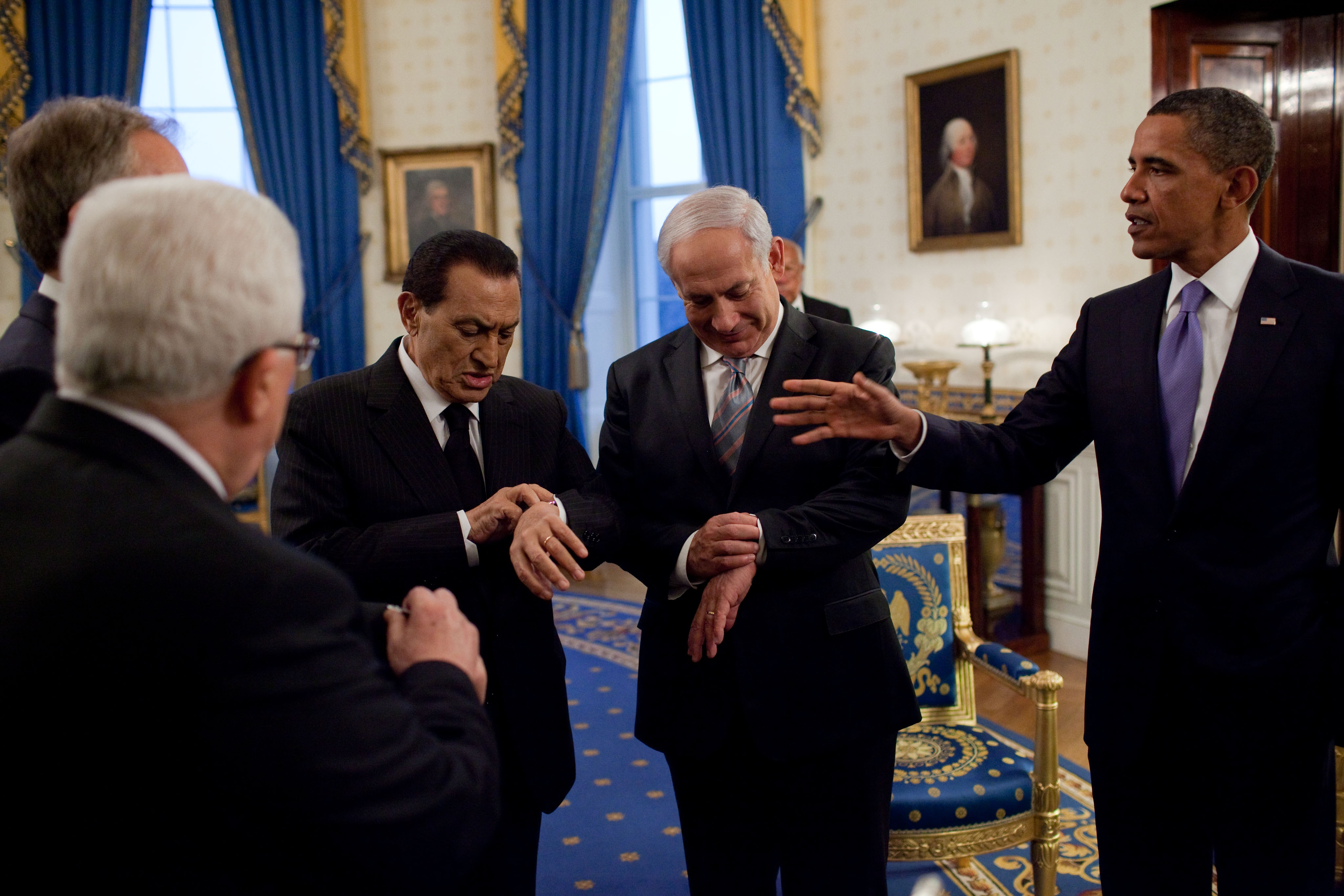

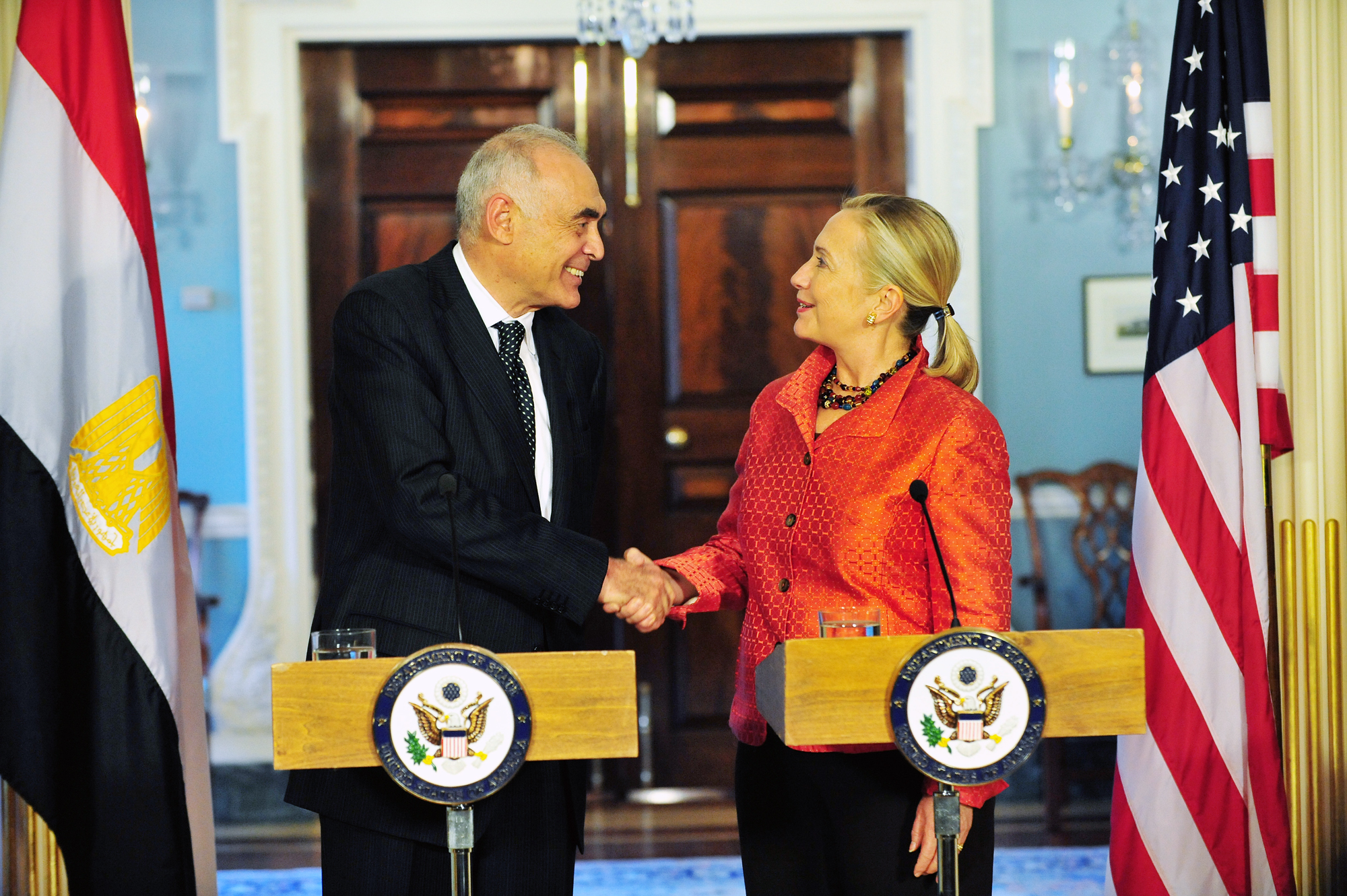

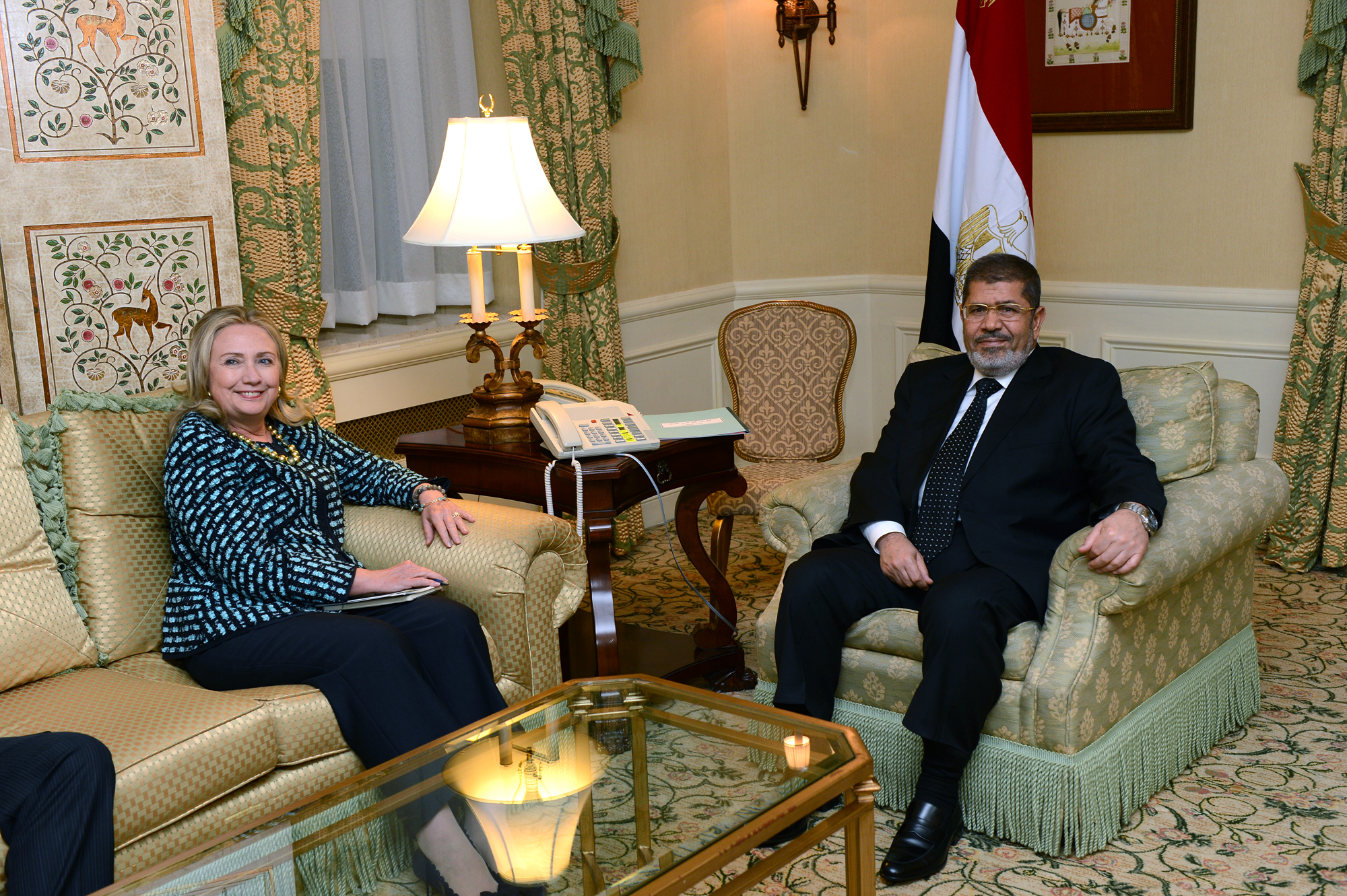

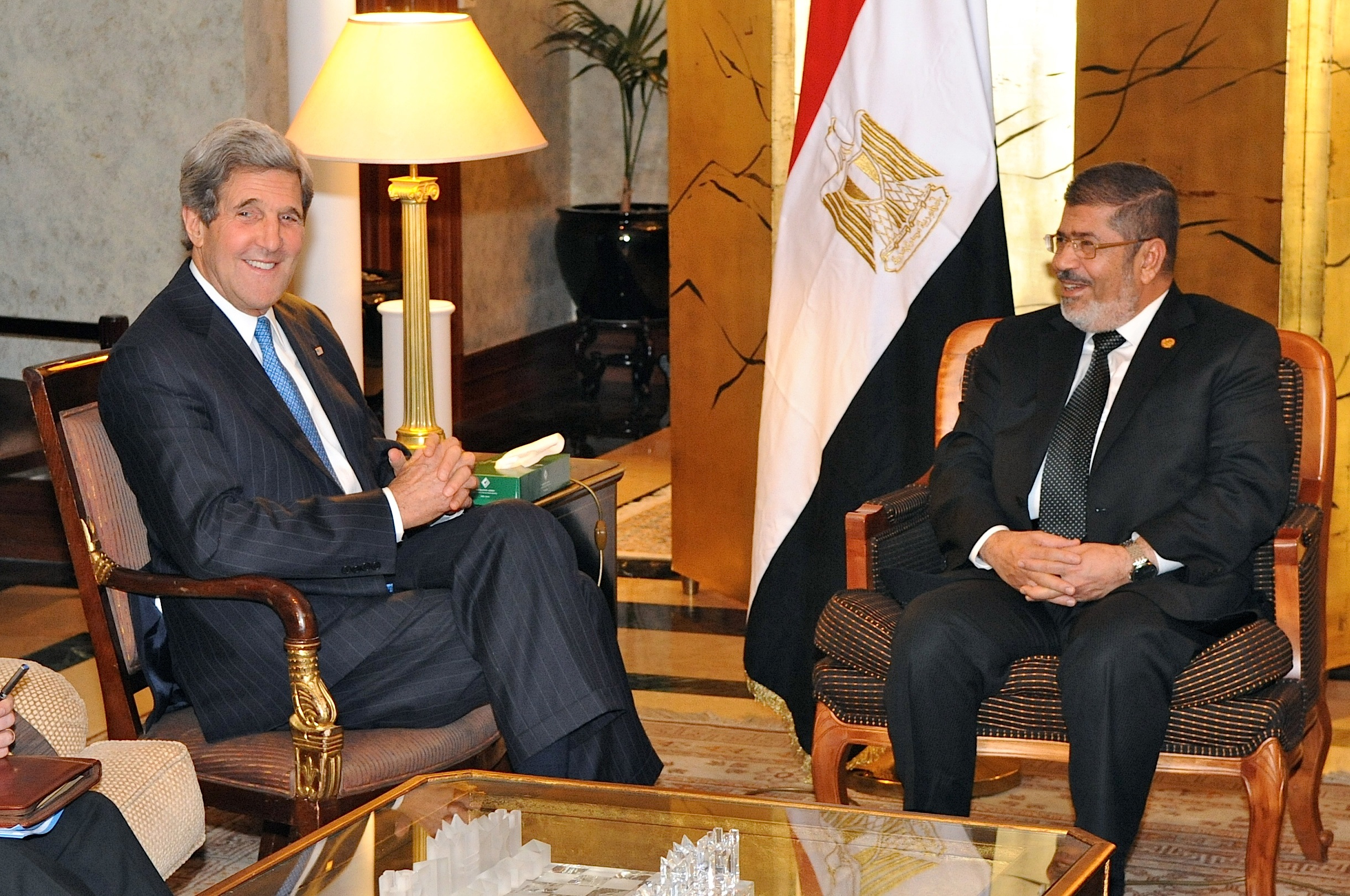

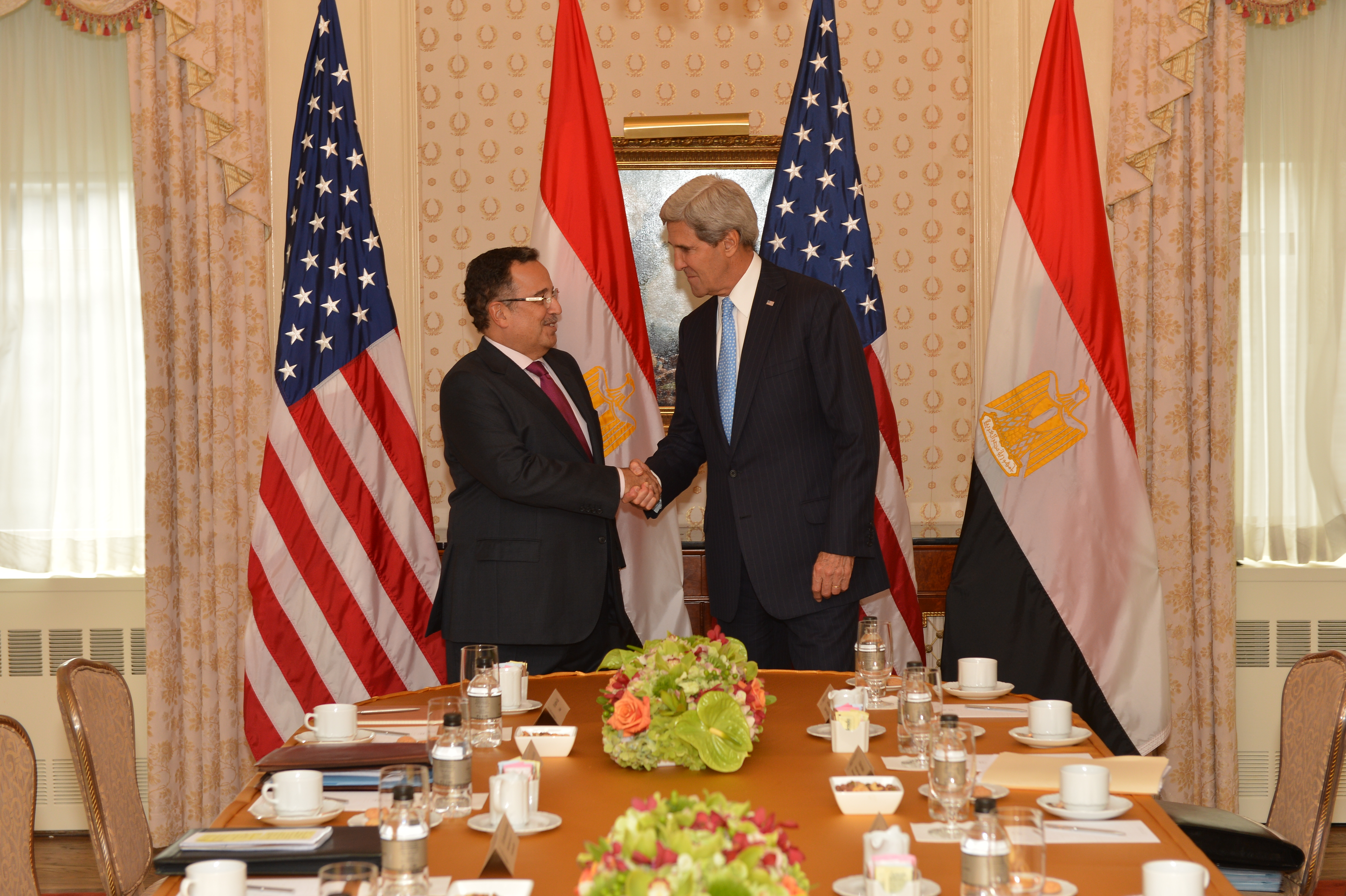

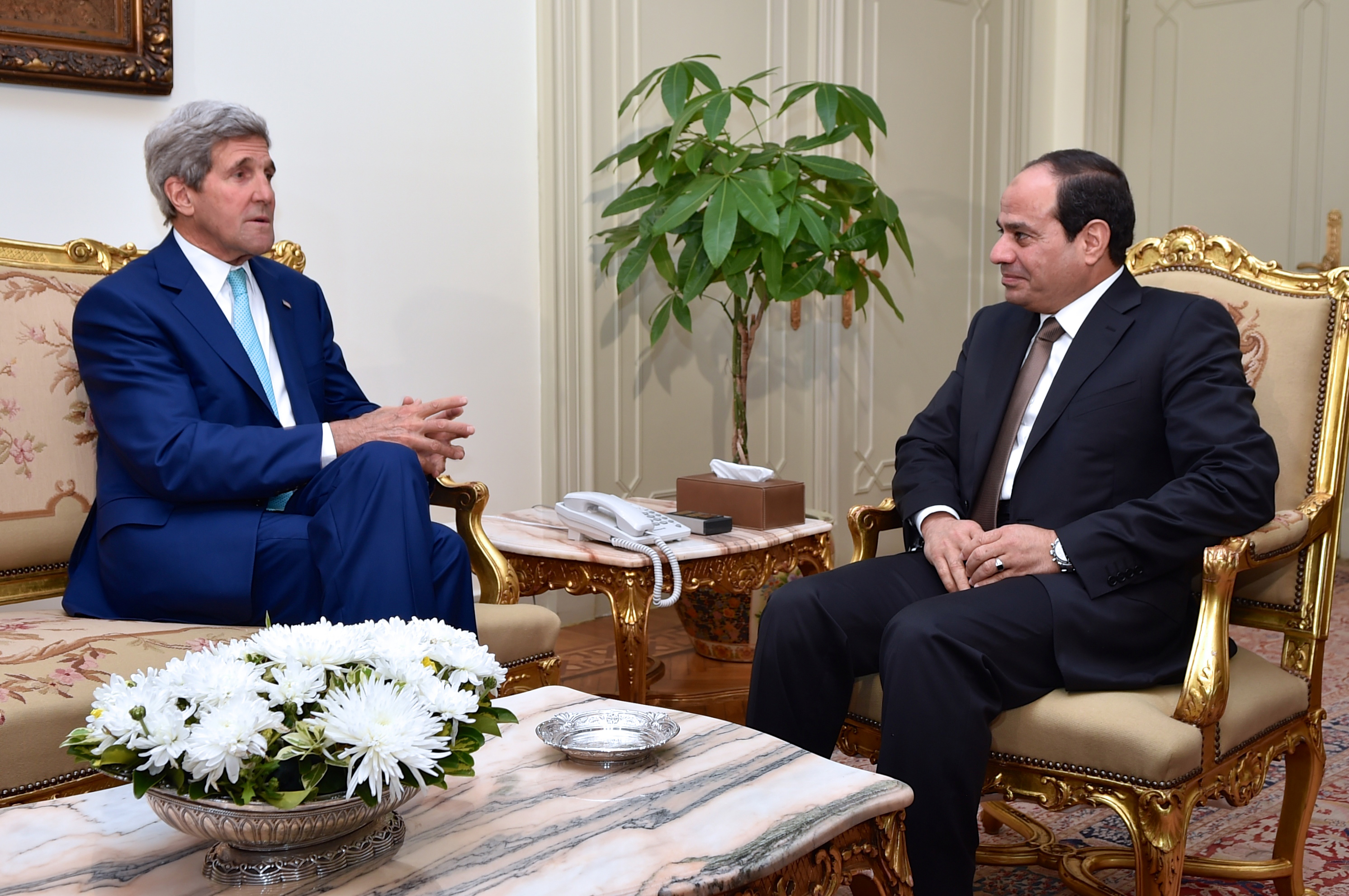

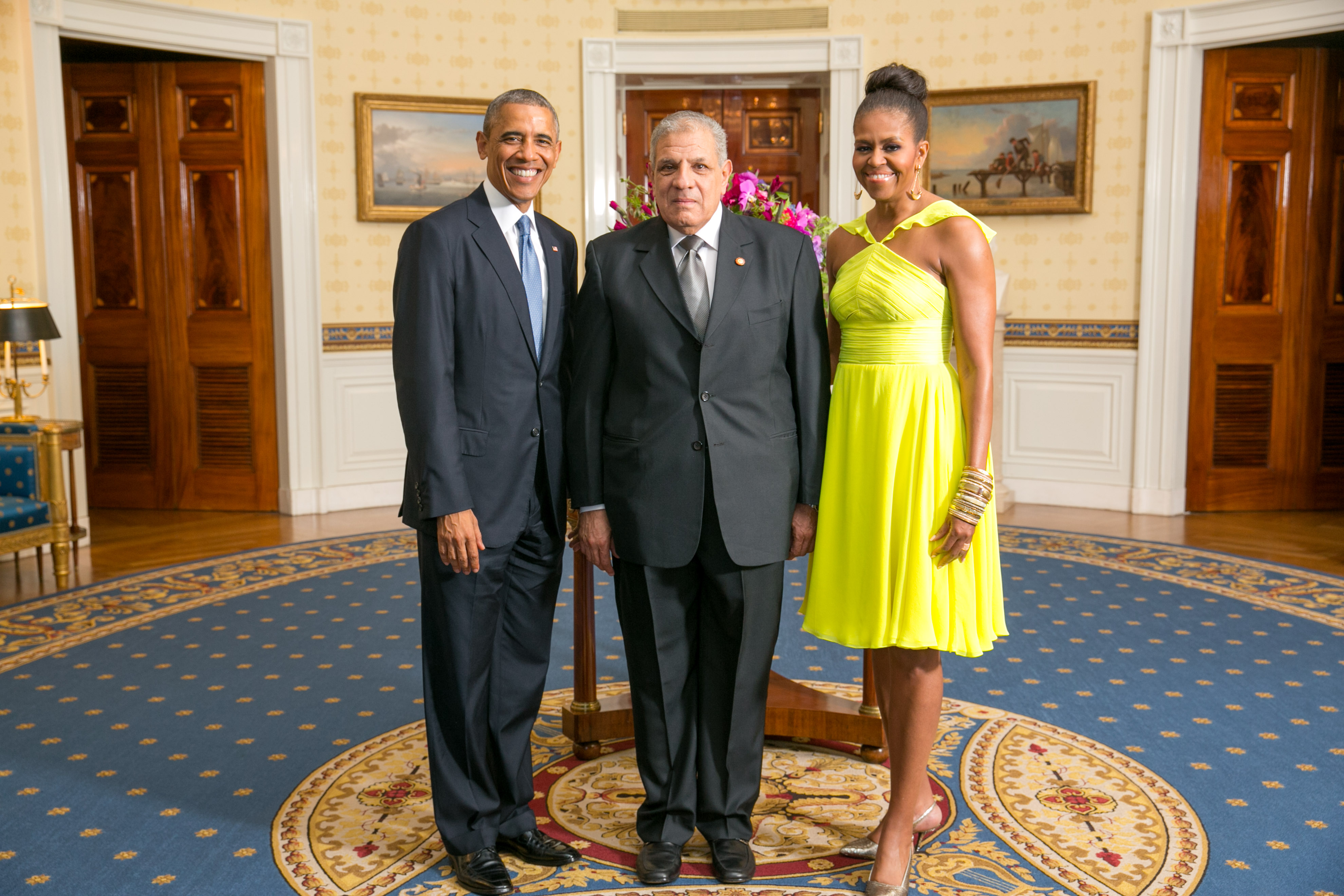

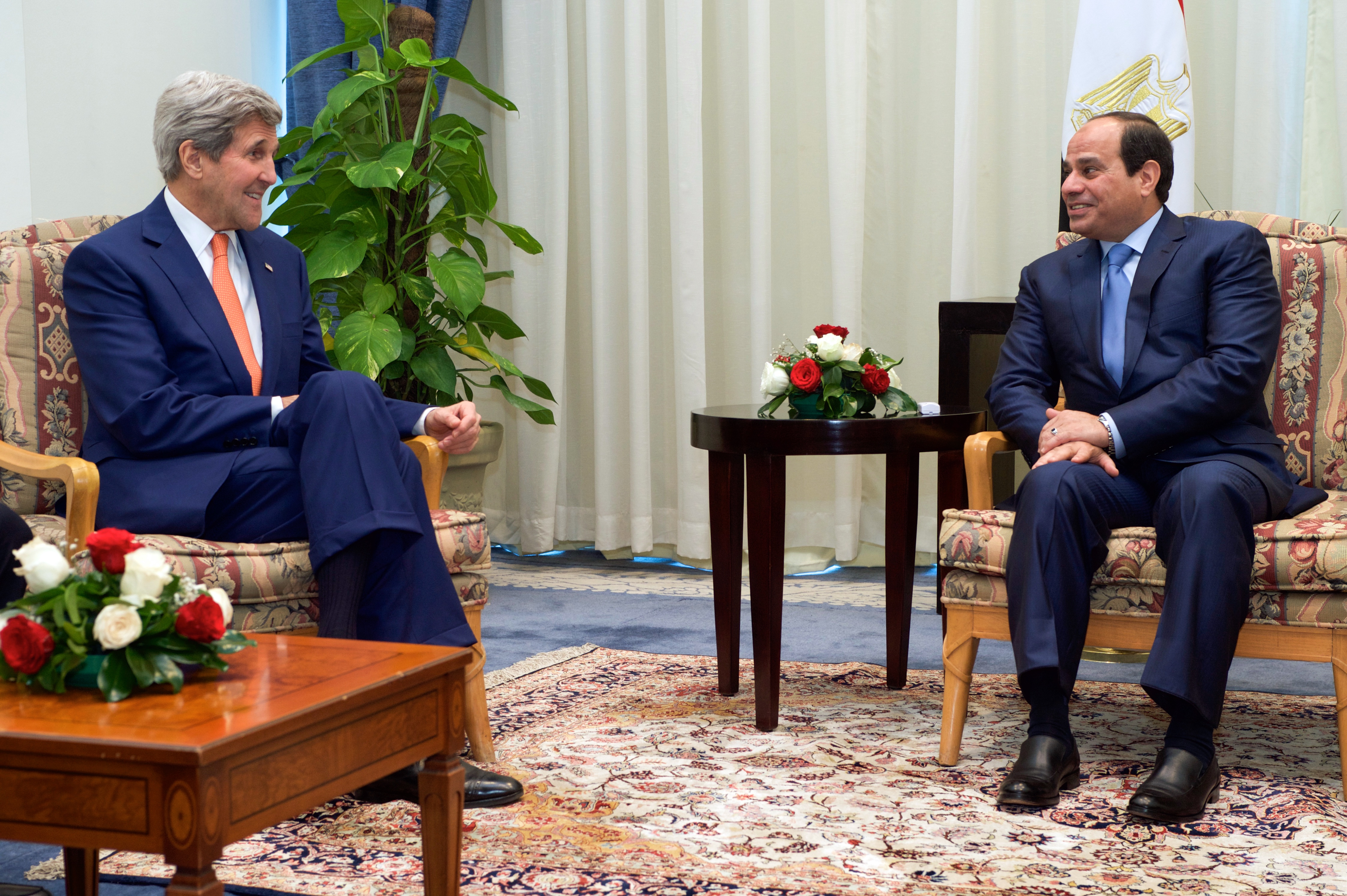

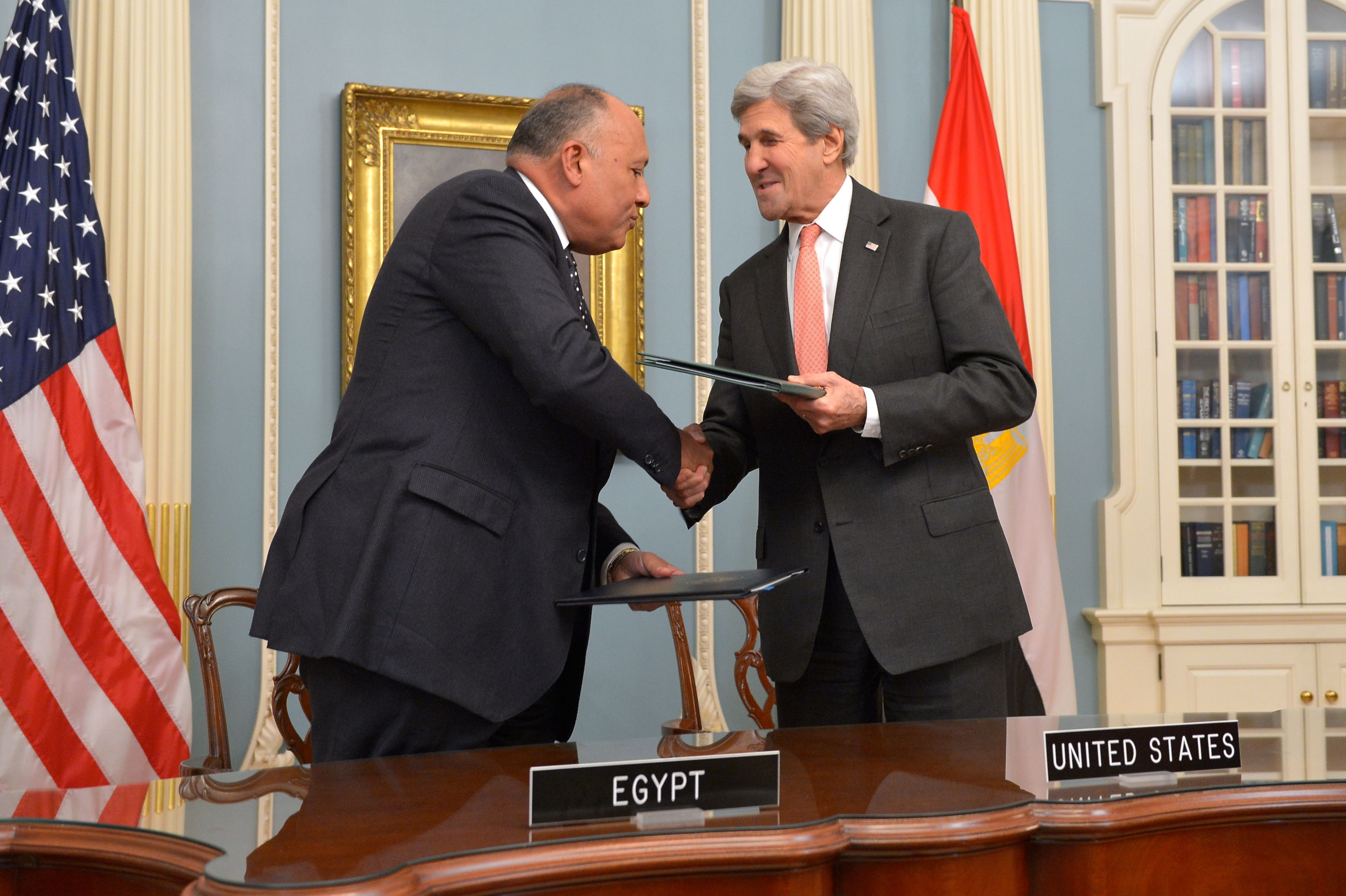

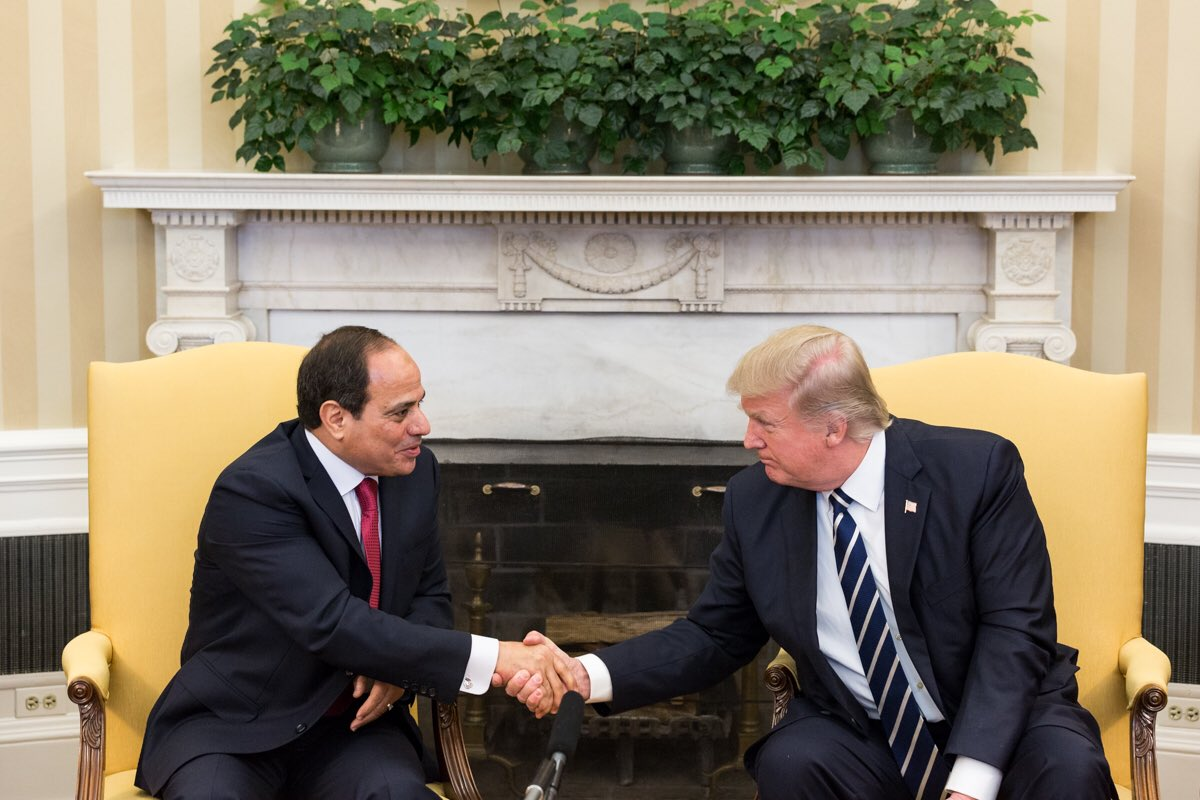

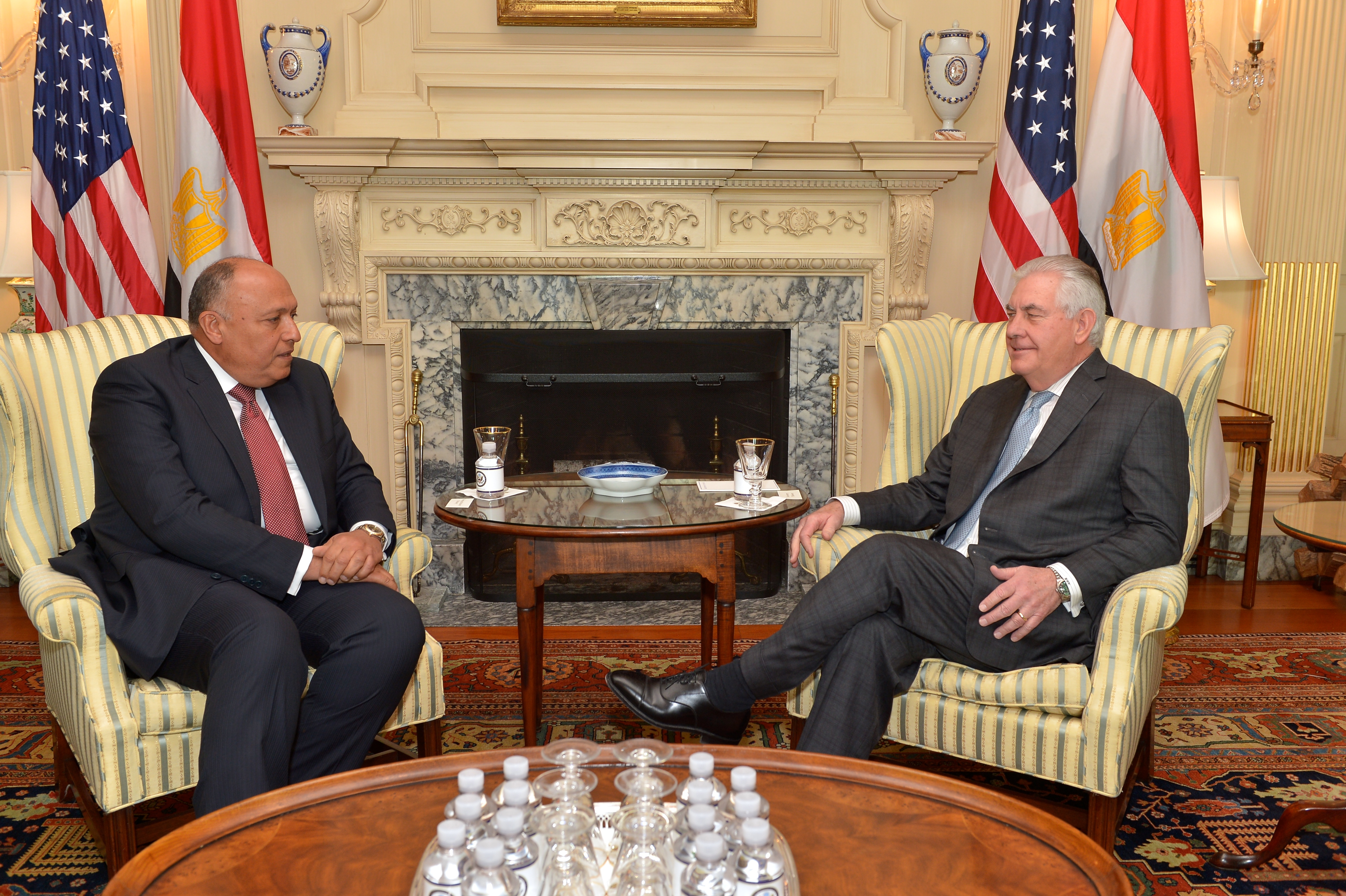

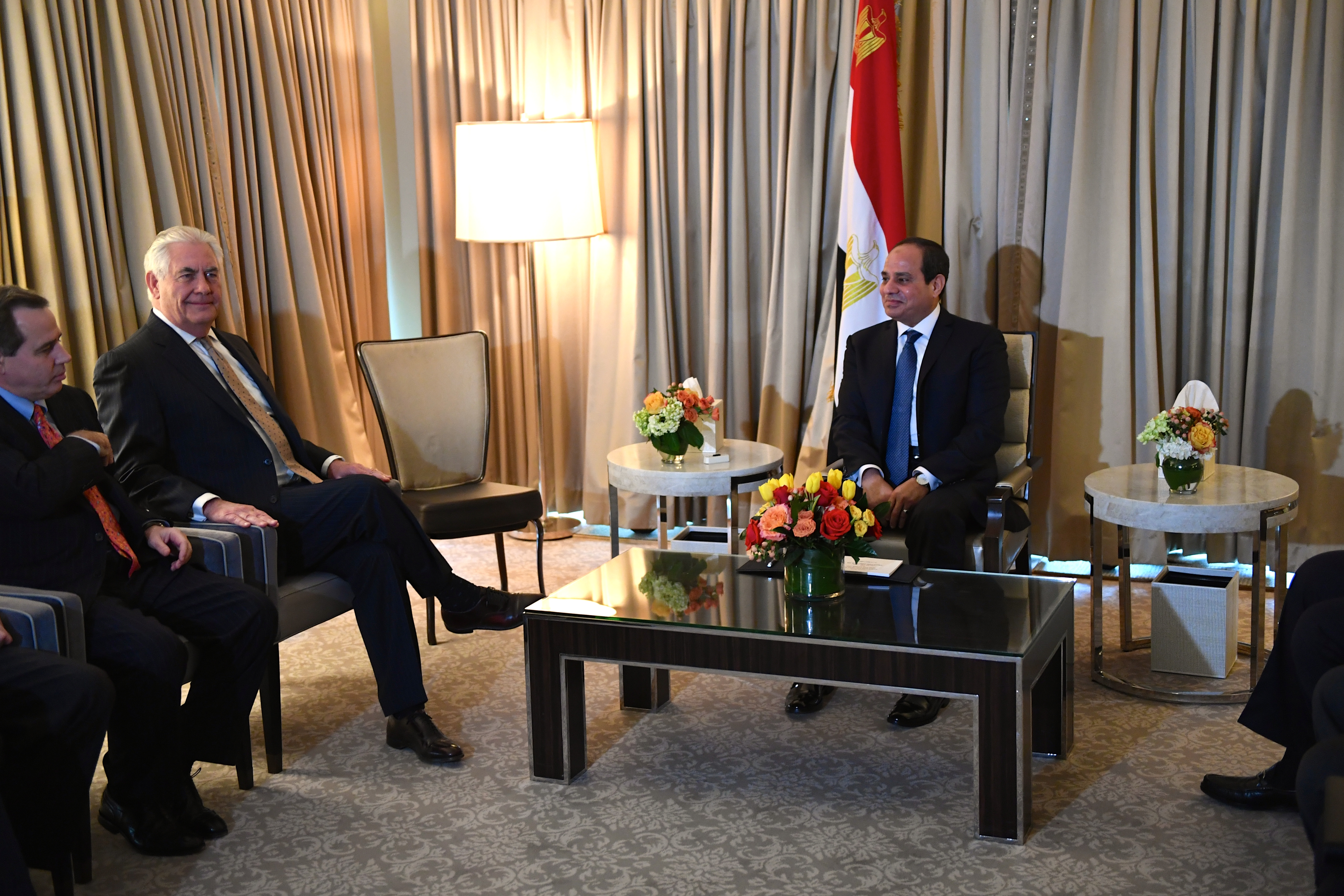

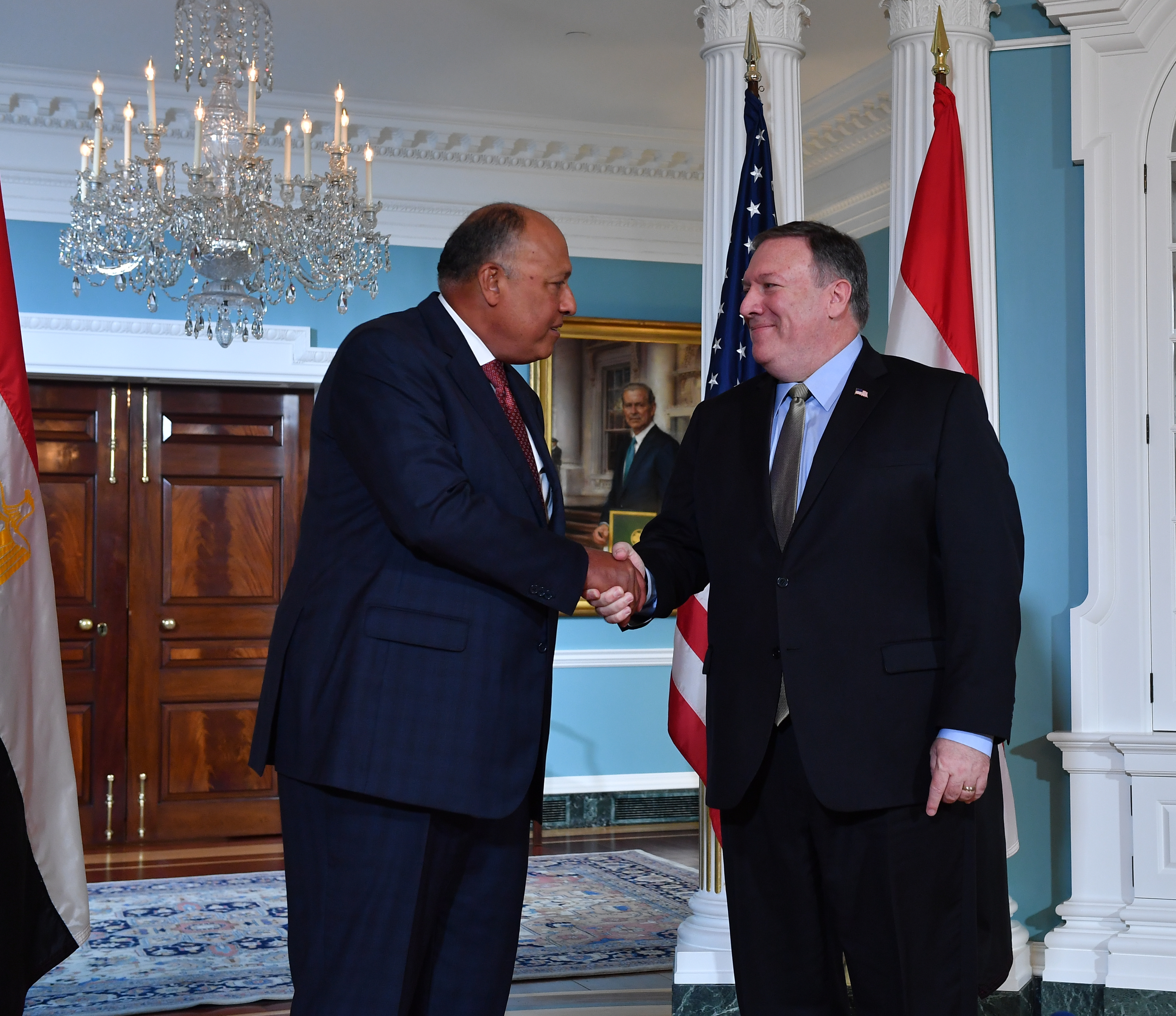

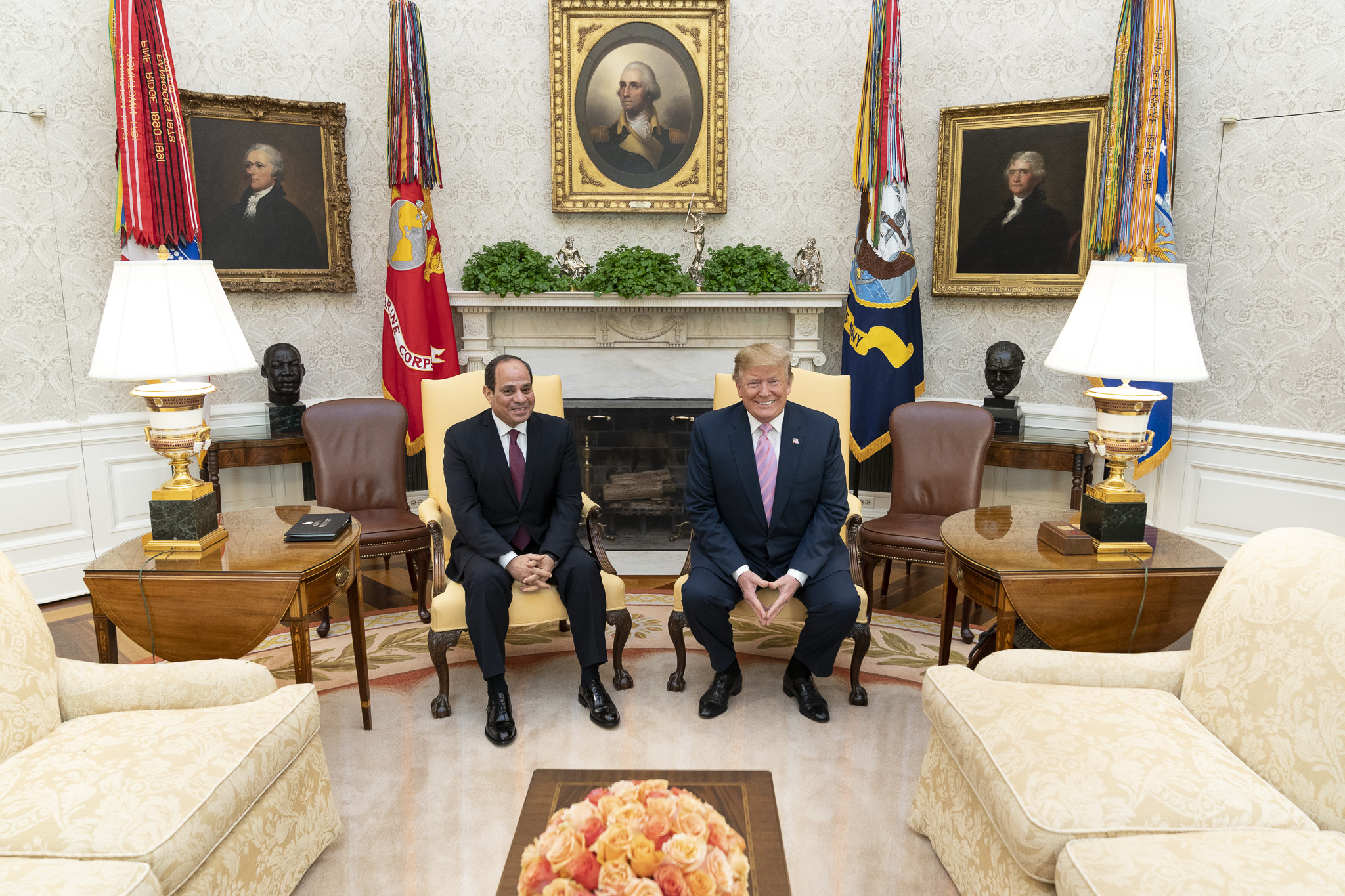

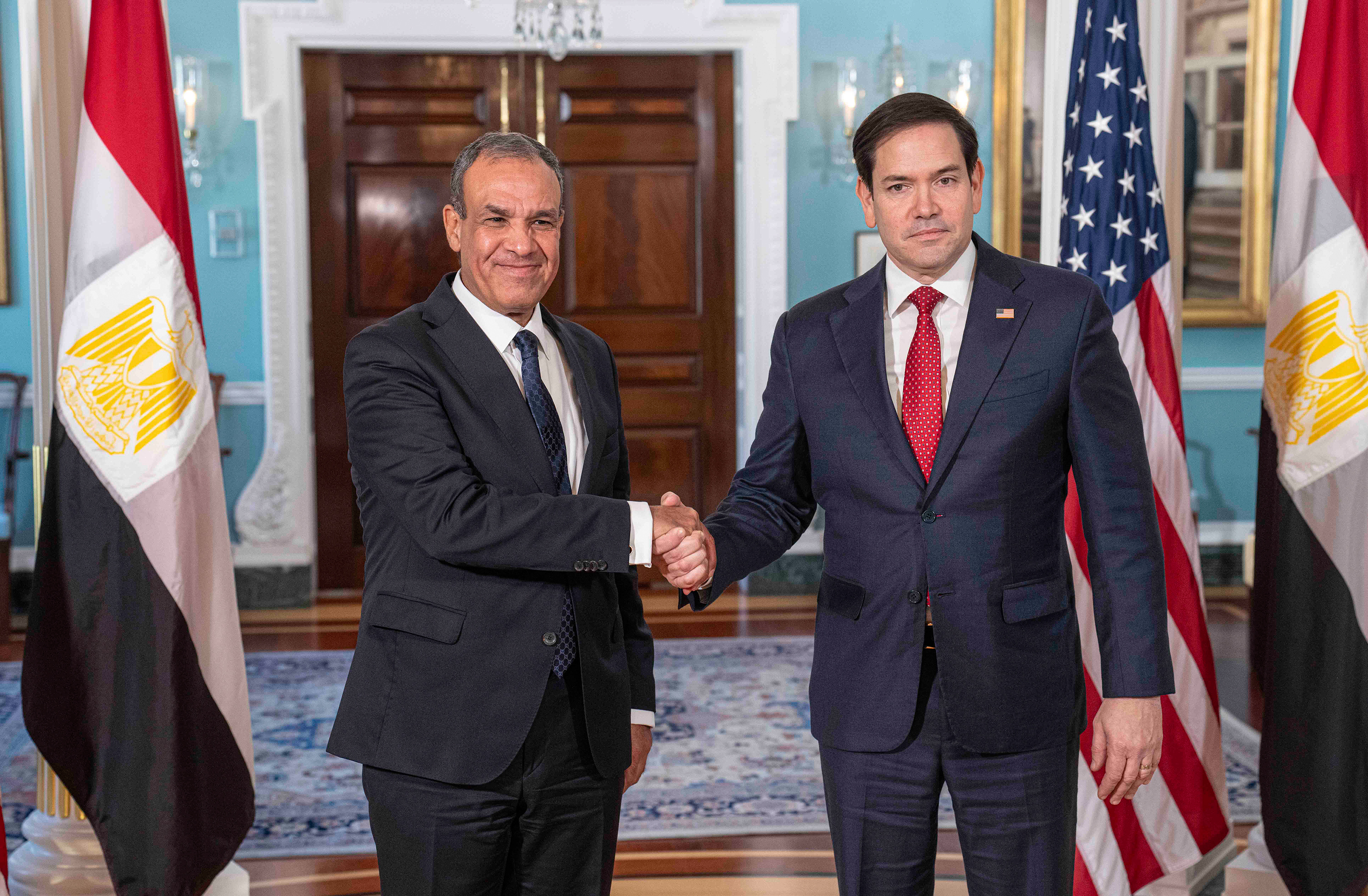

== Equatorial Guinea ==
Table of trips
Dates	Guest	Title	Reason
April 12, 2006	Teodoro Obiang Nguema Mbasogo	President	Met with Secretary of State Condoleezza Rice.
September 23, 2009	Teodoro Obiang Nguema Mbasogo	President	Addressed the sixty-fourth session of the United Nations General Assembly in New York City.
August 4–6, 2014	Teodoro Obiang Nguema Mbasogo	President	Attended the U.S.-Africa Leaders' Summit.
September 24–25, 2014	Teodoro Obiang Nguema Mbasogo	President	Addressed the sixty-ninth session of the United Nations General Assembly in New York City. Met with Russian Foreign Minister Sergey Lavrov.
December 13–15, 2022	Teodoro Obiang Nguema Mbasogo	President	Attended the U.S.-Africa Leaders' Summit.

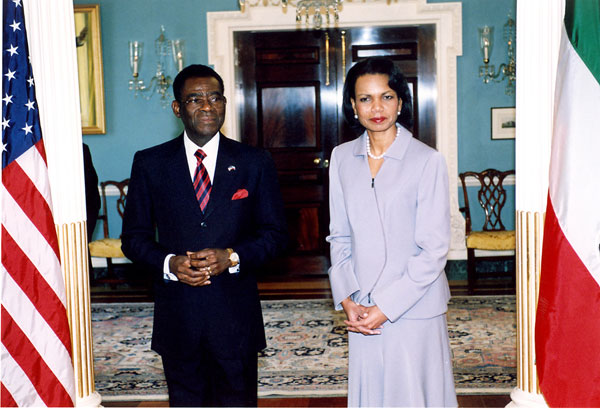

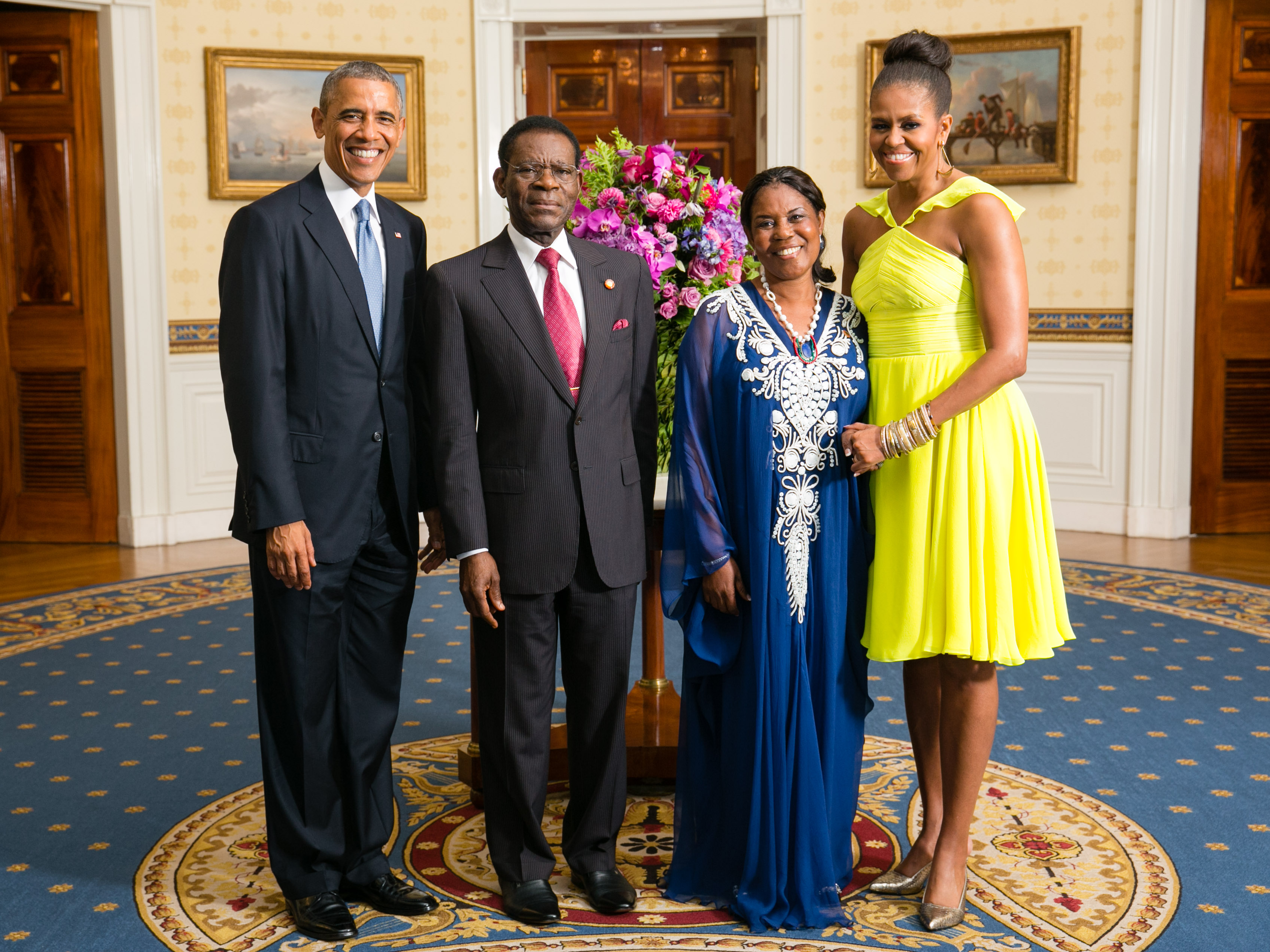

== Eritrea ==
Table of trips
Dates	Guest	Title	Reason
February 5–15, 1995	Isaias Afwerki	President	Working visit
April 25 – May 3, 1998	Isaias Afwerki	President	Met with President Clinton during a private visit.
September 23–25, 2011	Isaias Afwerki	President	Addressed the sixty-sixth session of the United Nations General Assembly in New York City.

== Eswatini ==
Table of trips
Dates	Guest	Title	Reason
December 13–15, 2022	Cleopas Dlamini	Prime Minister	Attended the U.S.-Africa Leaders' Summit.

== Ethiopia ==
Table of trips
Dates	Guest	Title	Reason
April 26 – June 14, 1945	Endelkachew Makonnen	Prime Minister	Led Ethiopian delegation to the United Nations Conference on International Organization in San Francisco.
May 26 – July 12, 1954	Haile Selassie	Emperor	At the invitation of the President Eisenhower. Addressed joint session of U.S. Congress on May 4. Afterwards, visited Princeton, New York City, Boston, Ann Arbor and Lansing, Chicago, St. Paul, Spokane and Seattle, San Francisco, Los Angeles, New Orleans, Stillwater and Fort Benning.
September 30 – October 7, 1963	Haile Selassie	Emperor	State visit; visited Philadelphia and New York City.
November 24–25, 1963	Haile Selassie	Emperor	Attended the funeral of President Kennedy.
February 13–17, 1967	Haile Selassie	Emperor	State visit. Afterwards visited New York City.
July 7–11, 1969	Haile Selassie	Emperor	State visit. Afterwards visited Atlanta and Cape Canaveral to view the Apollo 11 launch.
October 24–25, 1970	Haile Selassie	Emperor	Attended a dinner at the White House for the 25th anniversary of the United Nations; met privately with President Nixon on October 25.
May 14–15, 1973	Haile Selassie	Emperor	Official visit
August 10–16, 1994	Meles Zenawi	President	Working visit
October 19, 1995	Meles Zenawi	Prime Minister	Attended an Africare dinner with President Clinton.
December 4–5, 2002	Meles Zenawi	Prime Minister	Working visit
August 4–6, 2014	Hailemariam Desalegn	Prime Minister	Attended the United States–Africa Leaders Summit. Met with Secretary of State John Kerry.
September 21–23, 2014	Hailemariam Desalegn	Prime Minister	Participated in the Climate Summit on September 23. Addressed the sixty-ninth session of the United Nations General Assembly in New York City on September 25. Met with President Obama on September 25.

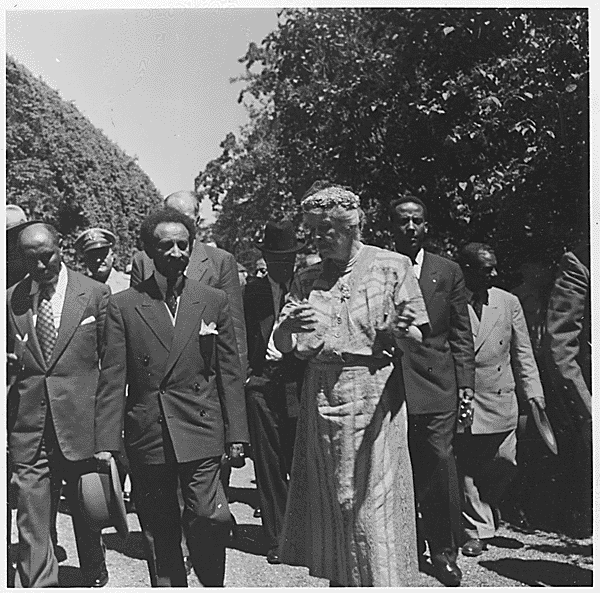

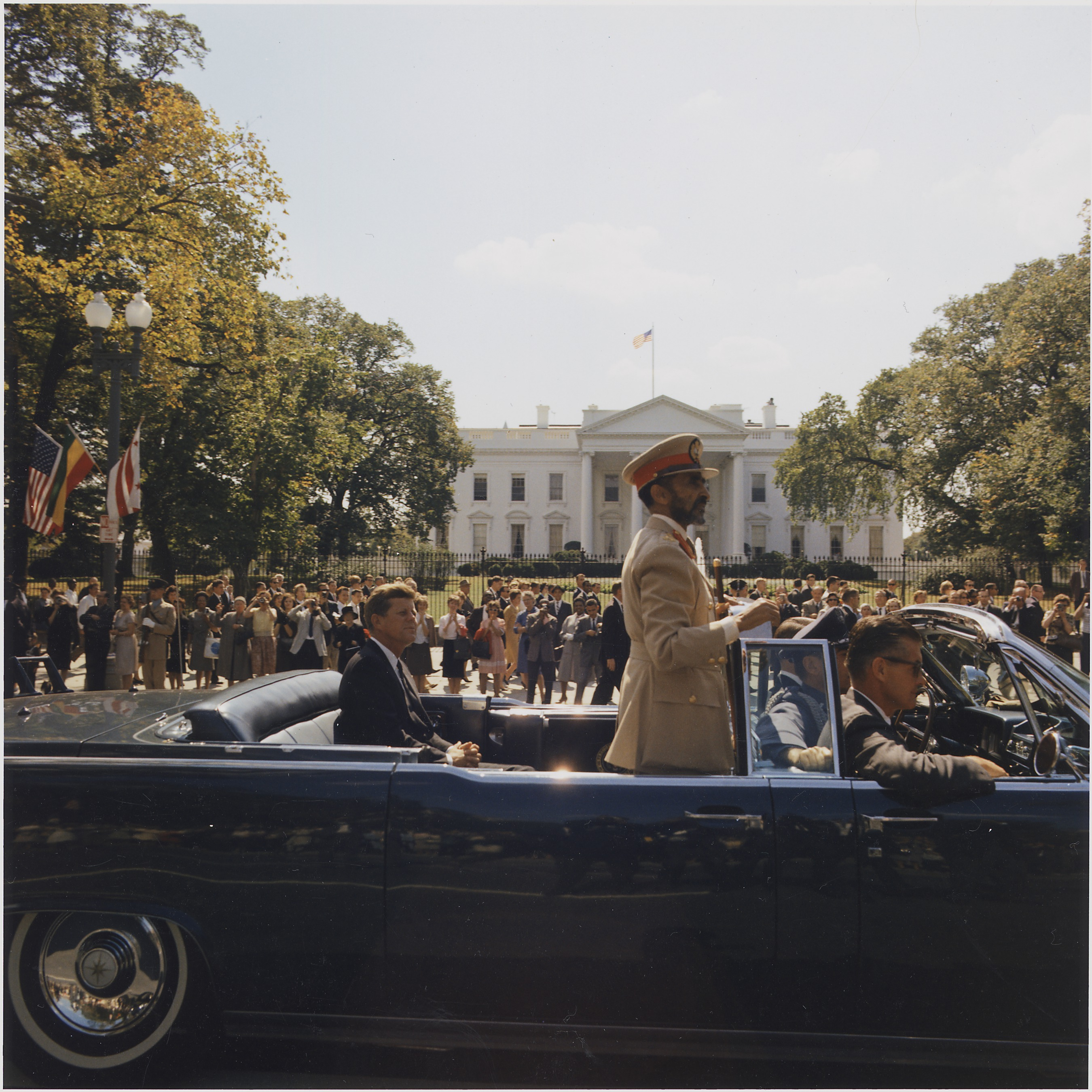

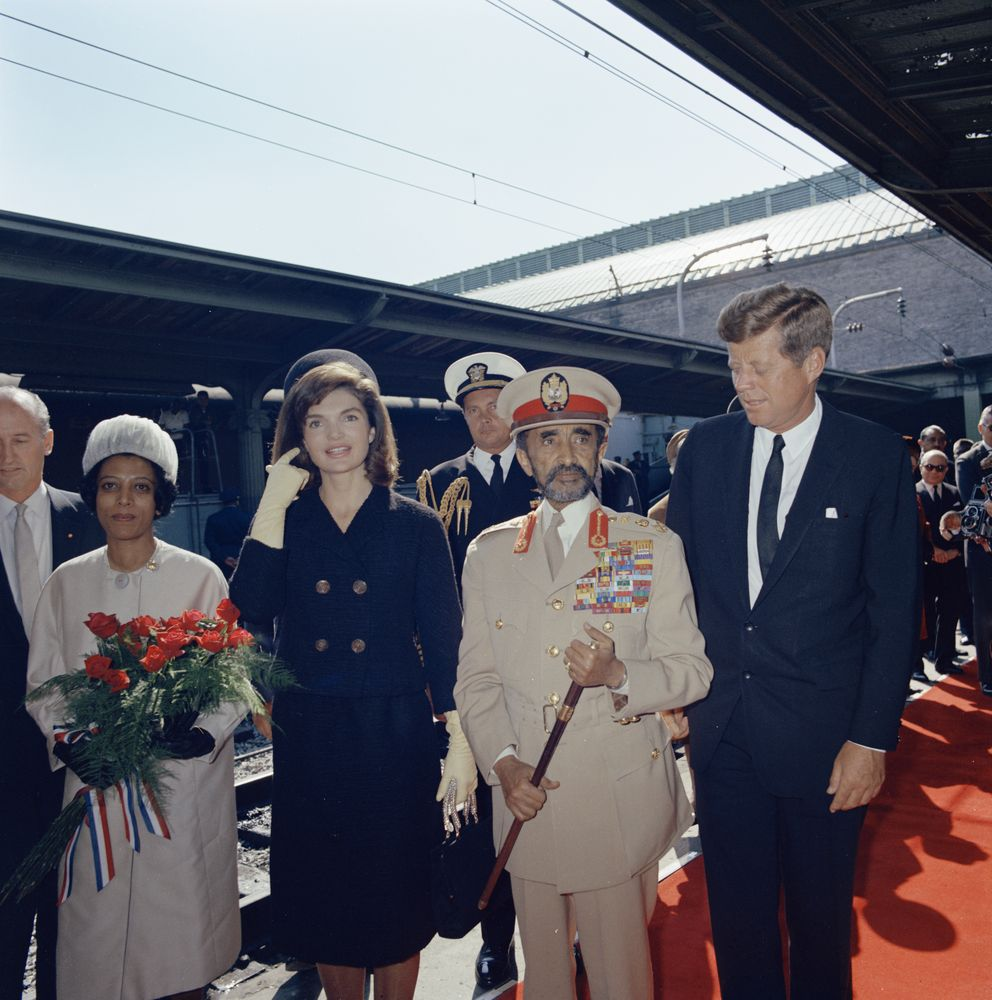

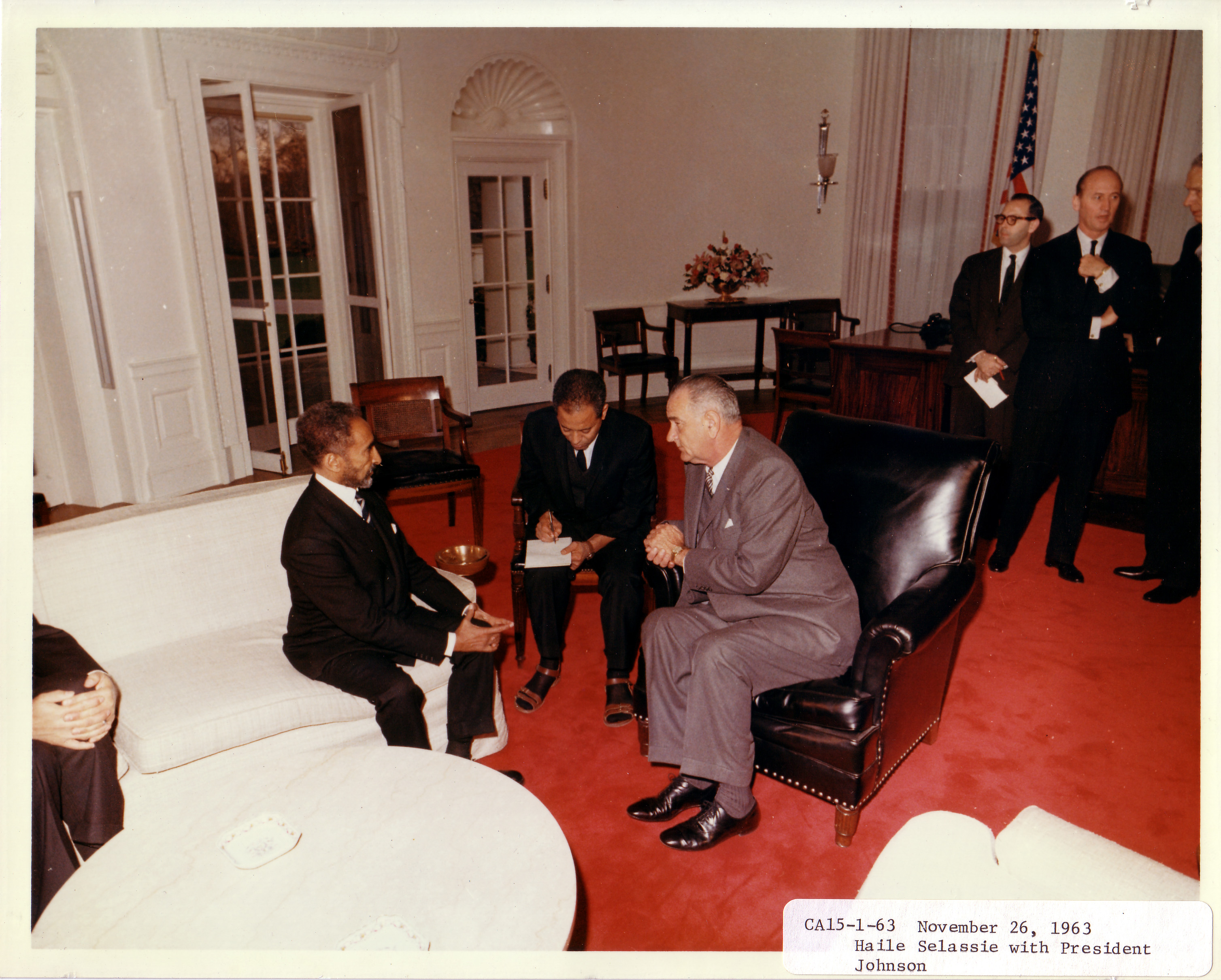

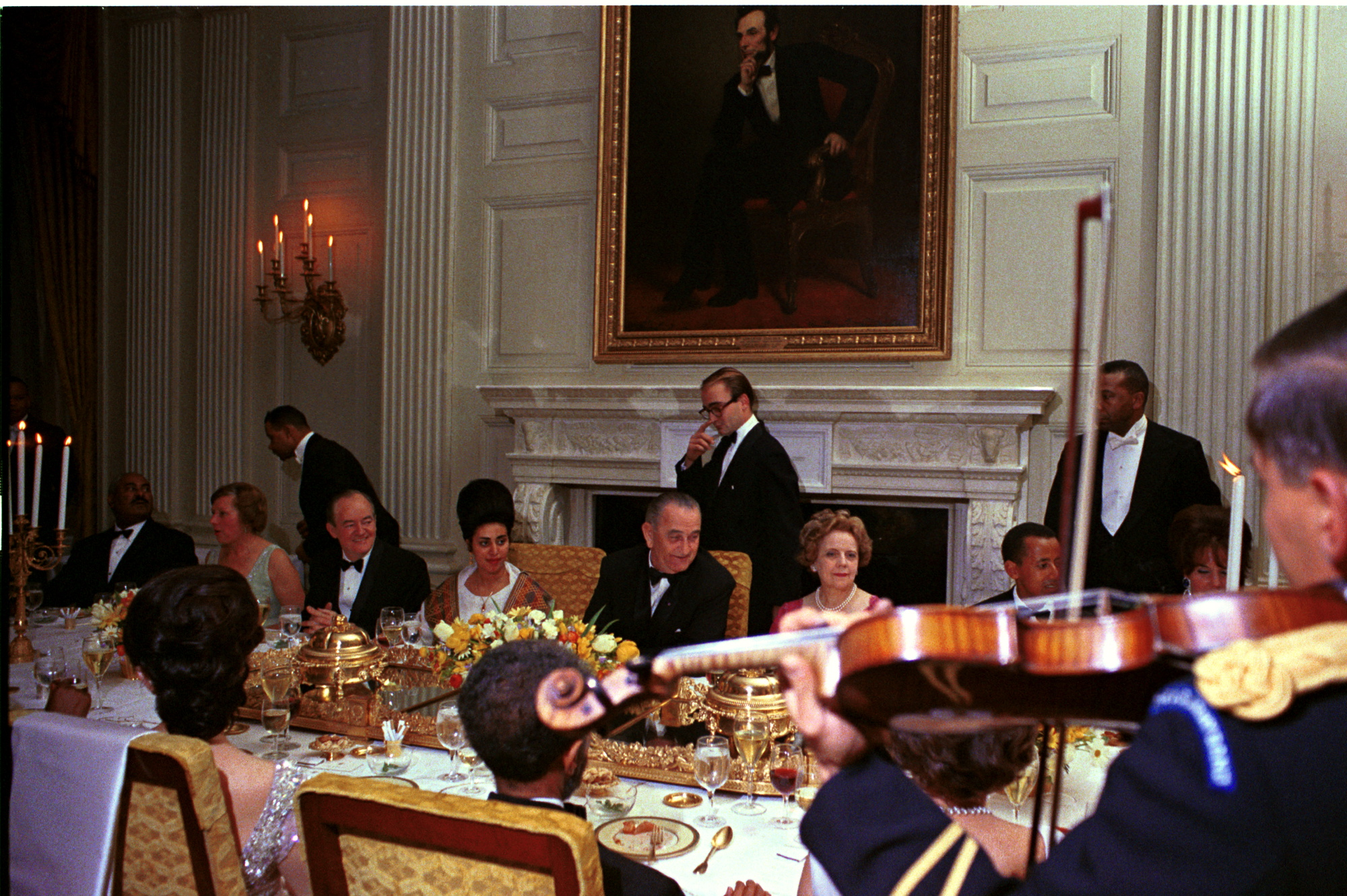

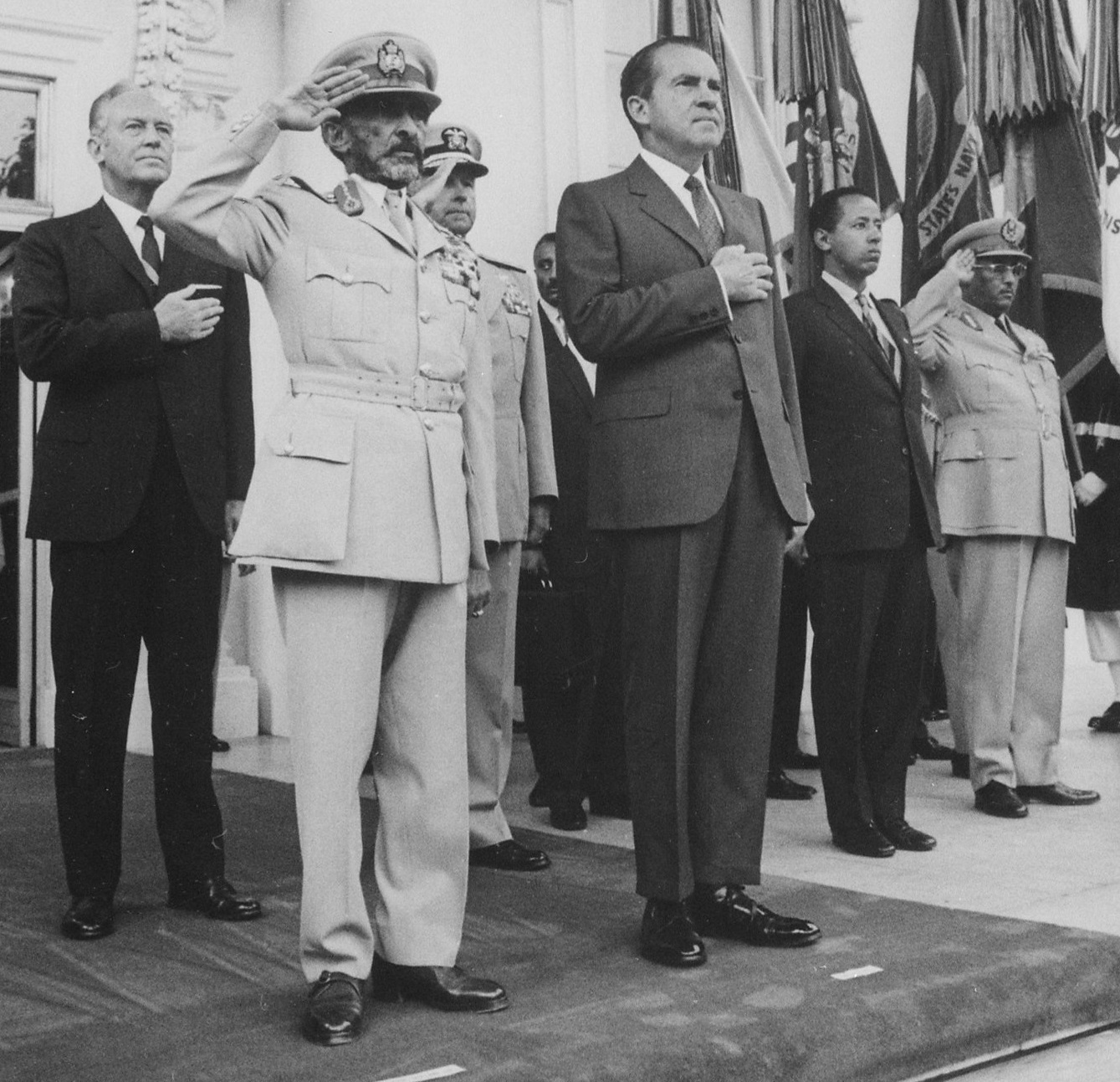

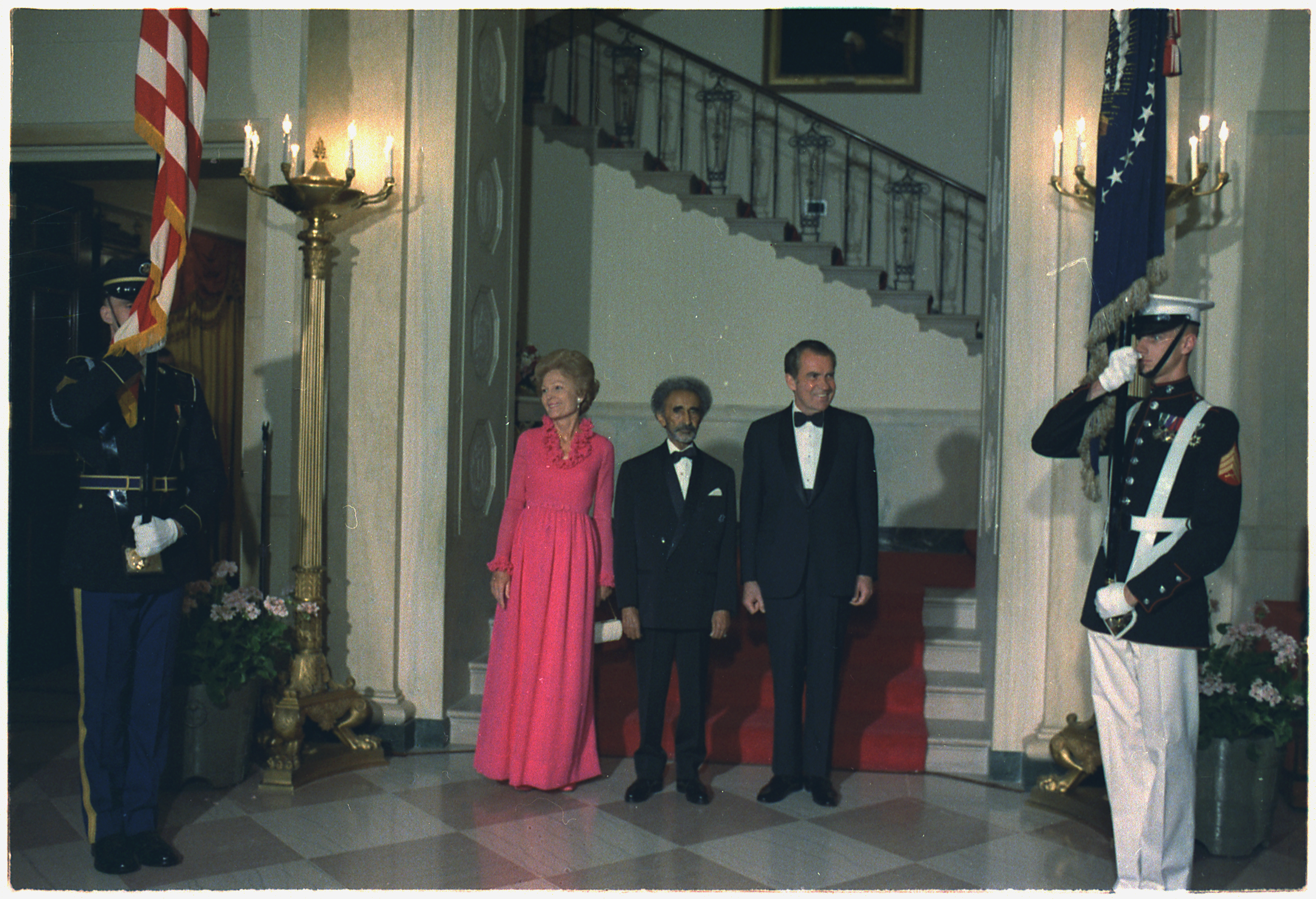

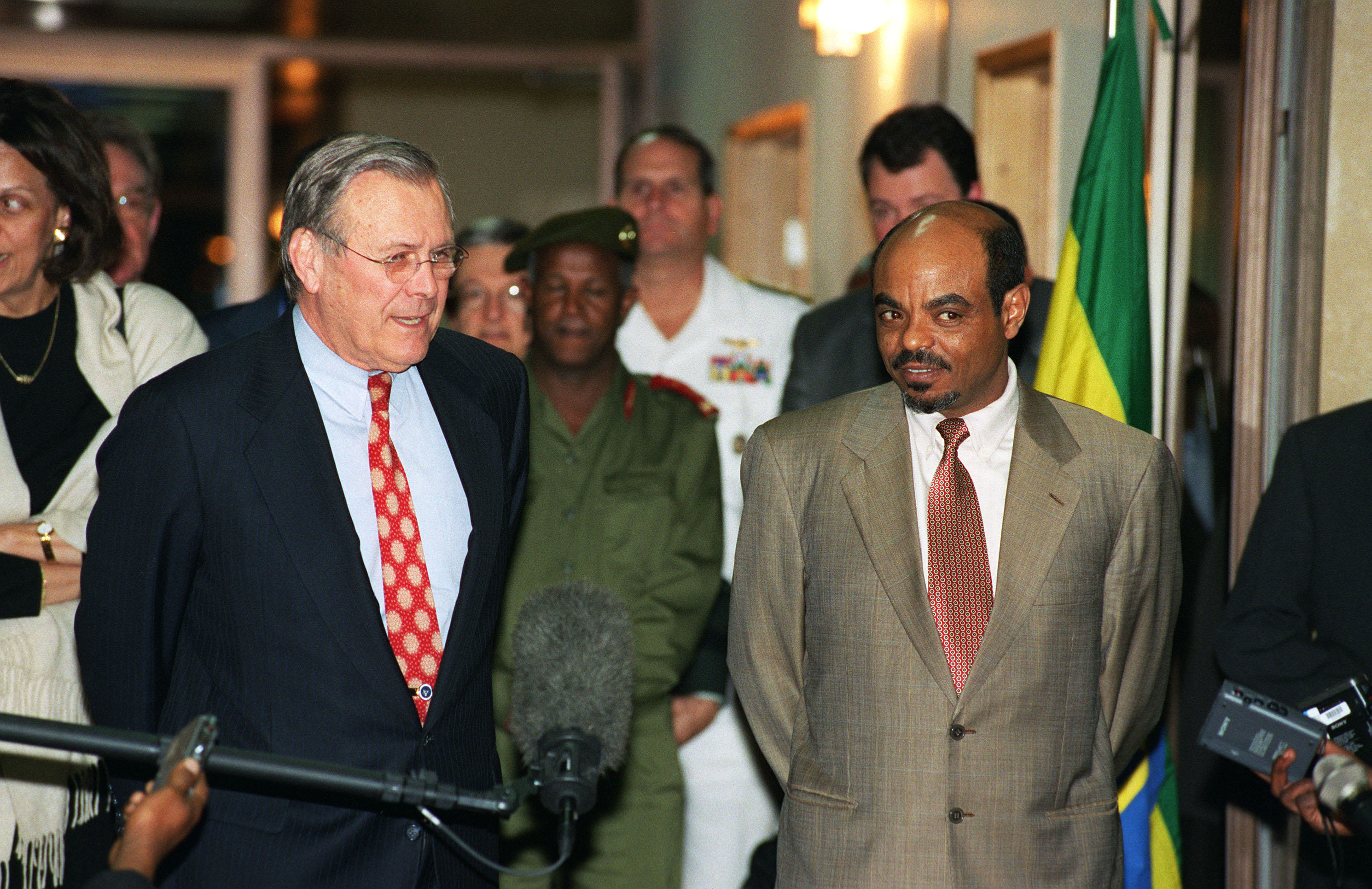

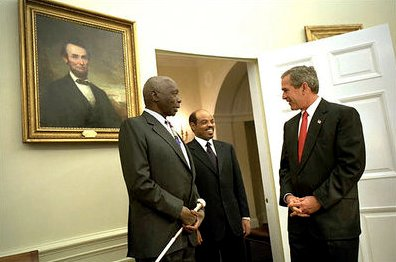

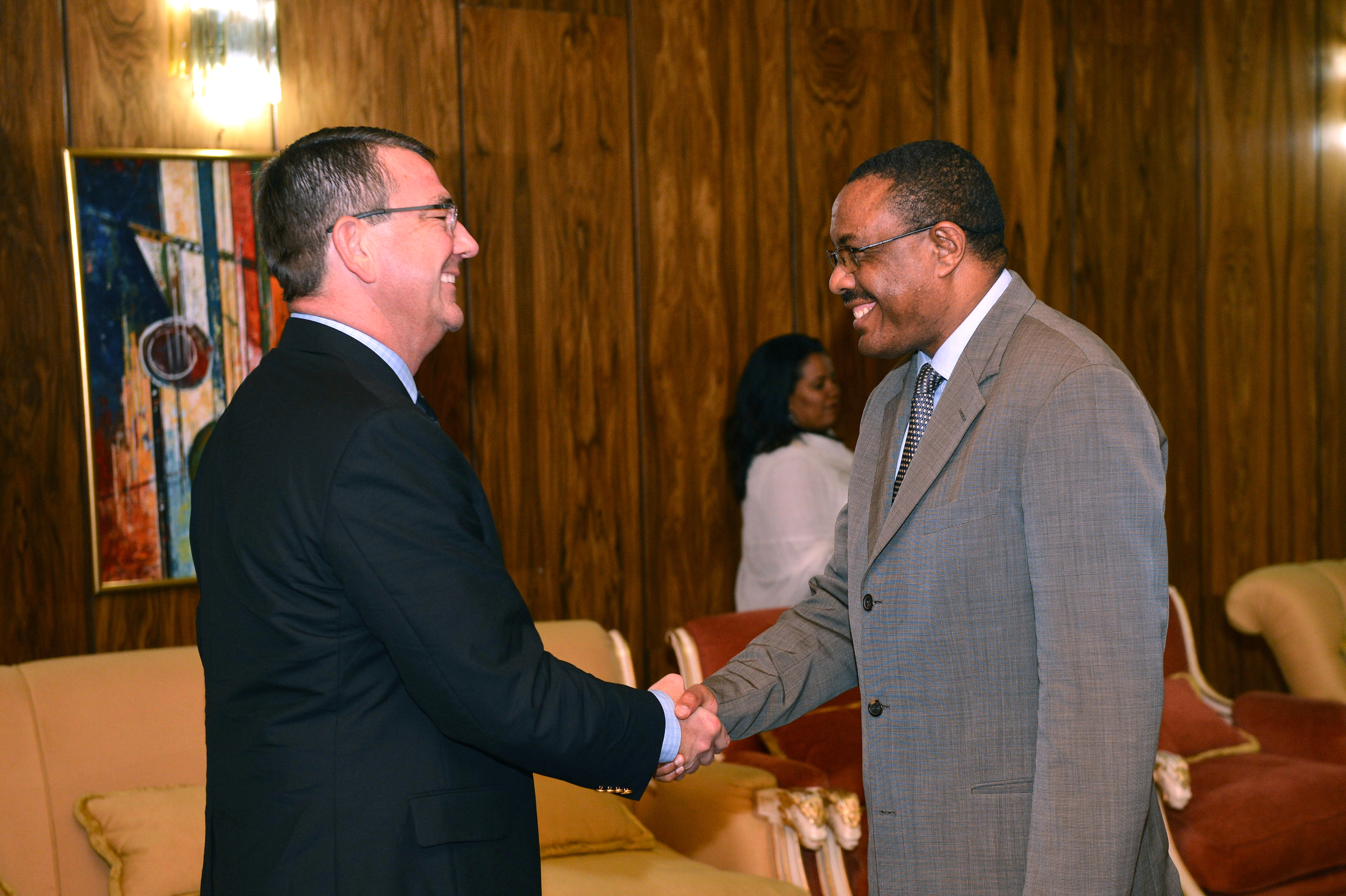

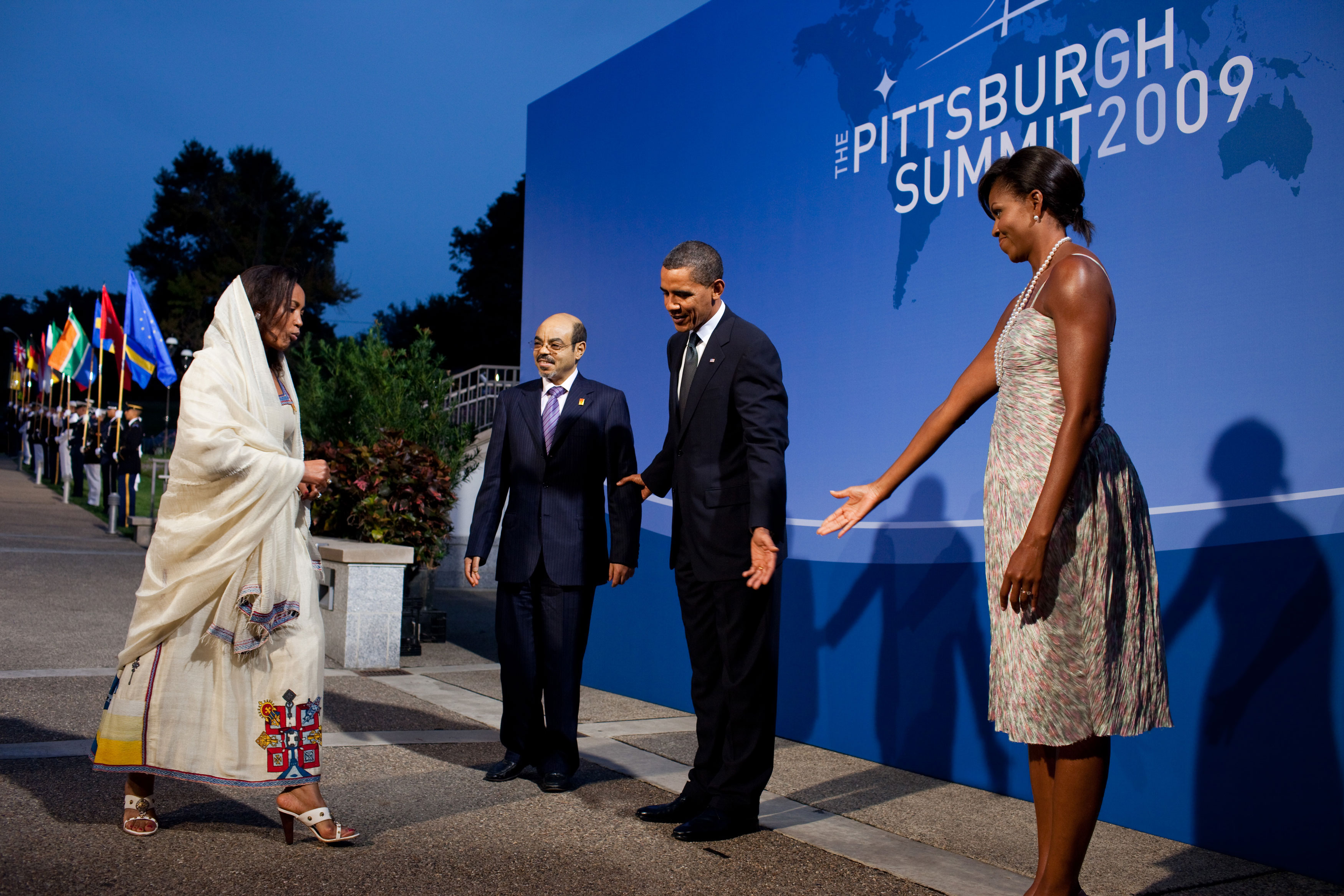

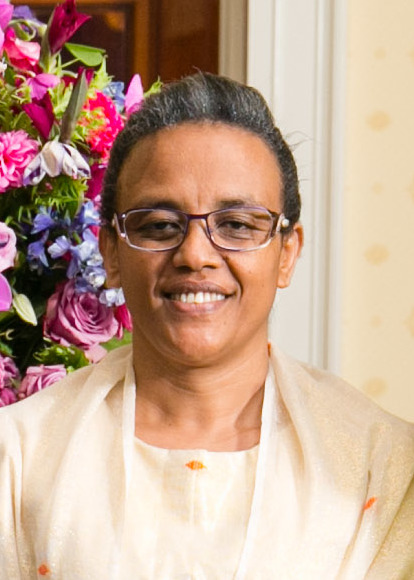

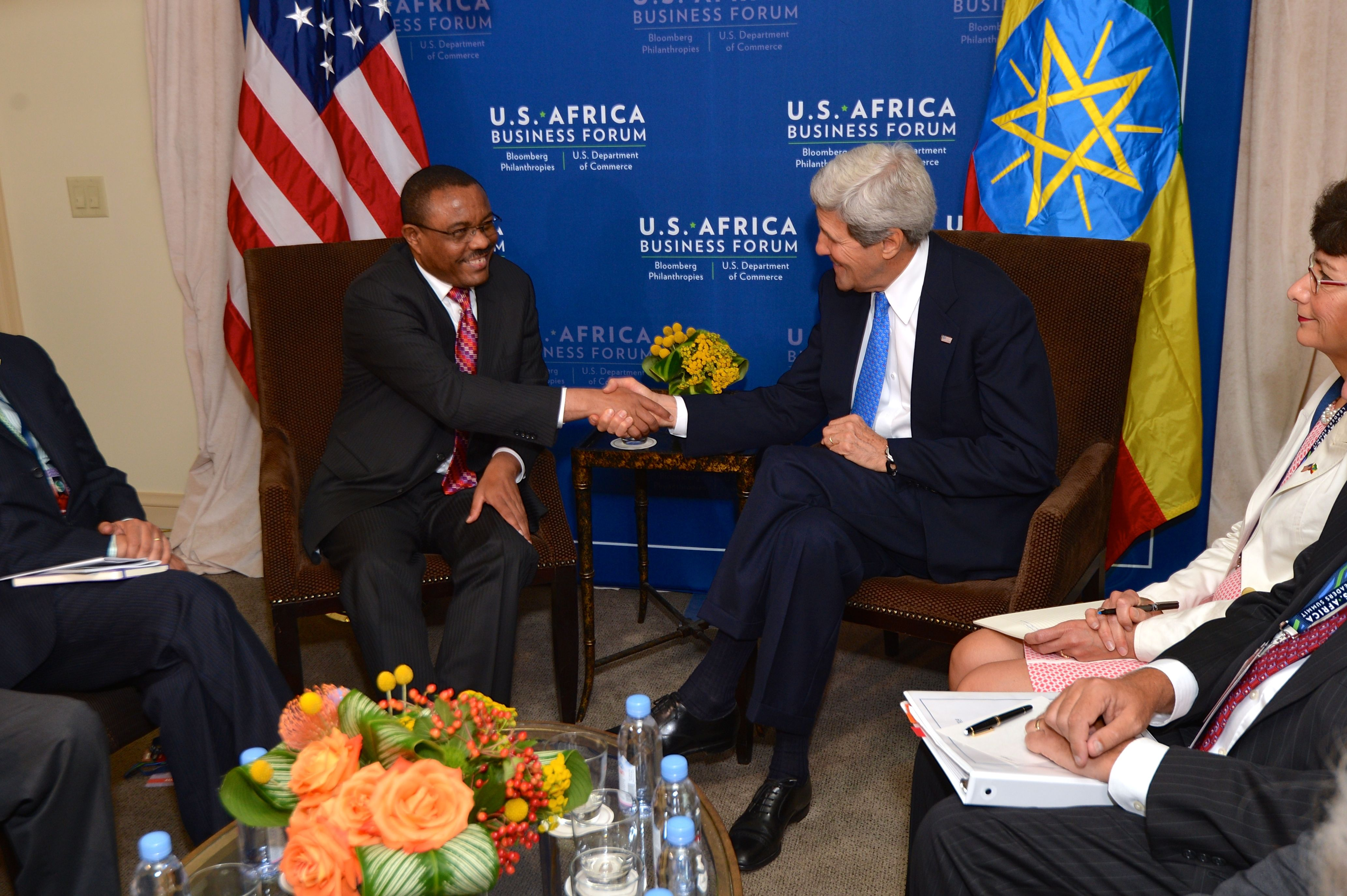

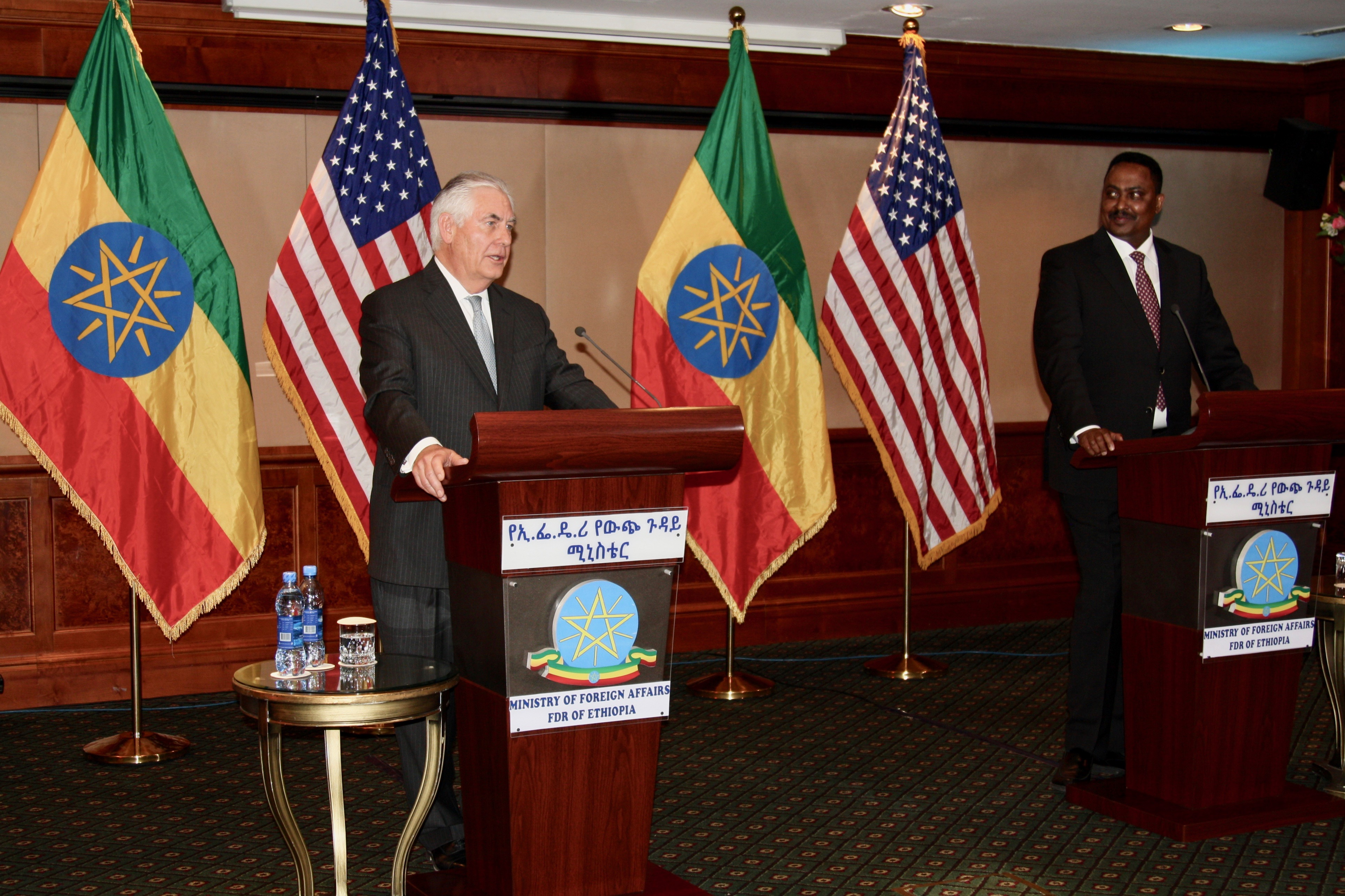

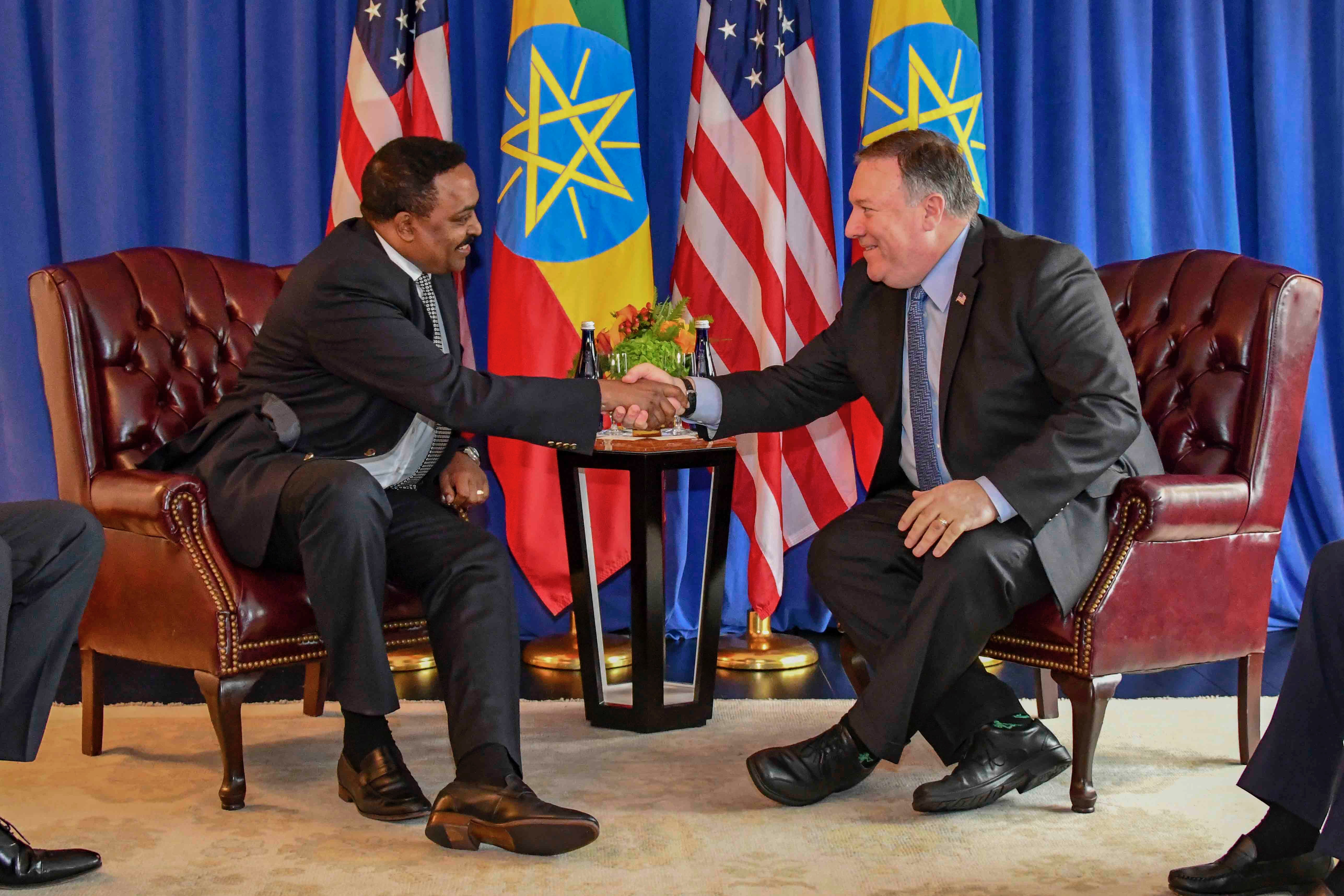

== Gabon ==
Table of trips
Dates	Guest	Title	Reason
August 2, 1973	Omar Bongo	President	Private visit; met with President Nixon at the White House.
March 3, 1977	Omar Bongo	President	Met with President Carter during a private visit.
October 17, 1977	Omar Bongo	President	Met with President Carter during a private visit.
June 15, 1981	Omar Bongo	President	Met with President Reagan during a private visit.
July 30 – August 3, 1987	Omar Bongo	President	Official working visit. Also visited Atlanta on August 1–2. Private visit to Houston afterwards.
May 26, 2004	Omar Bongo	President	Working visit
June 9, 2011	Ali Bongo Ondimba	President	Working visit
August 4–6, 2014	Ali Bongo Ondimba	President	Attended the United States–Africa Leaders Summit.
March 31 – April 1, 2016	Ali Bongo Ondimba	President	Attended the Nuclear Security Summit.

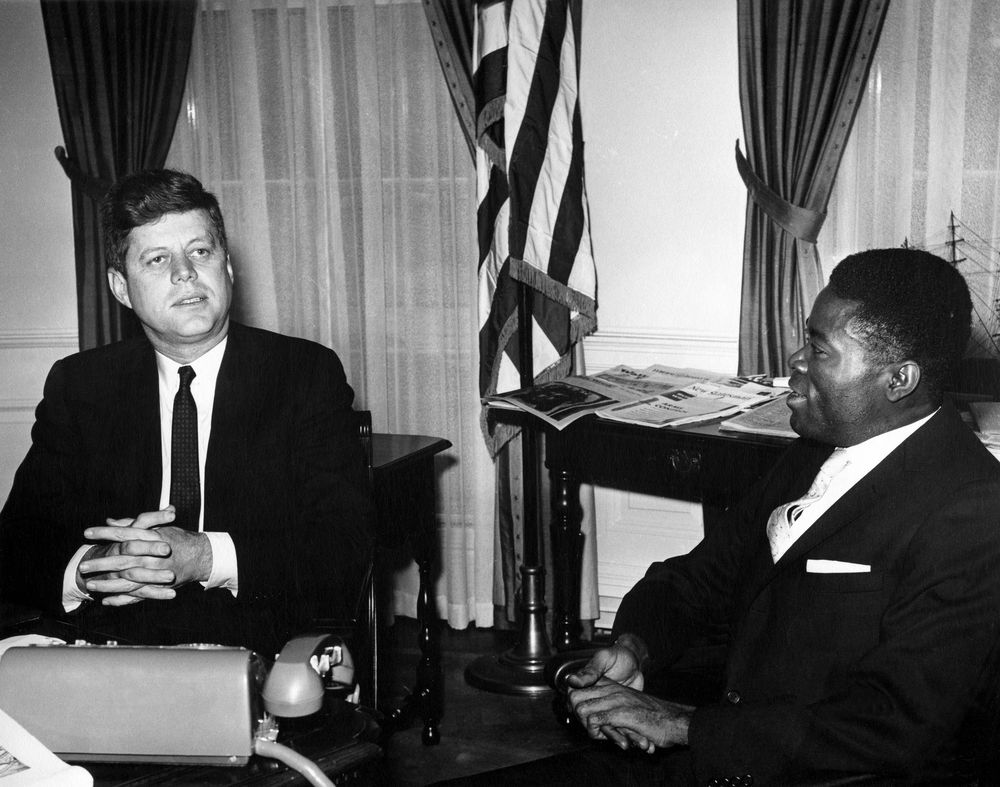

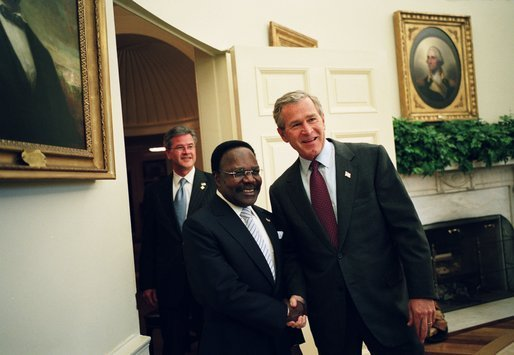

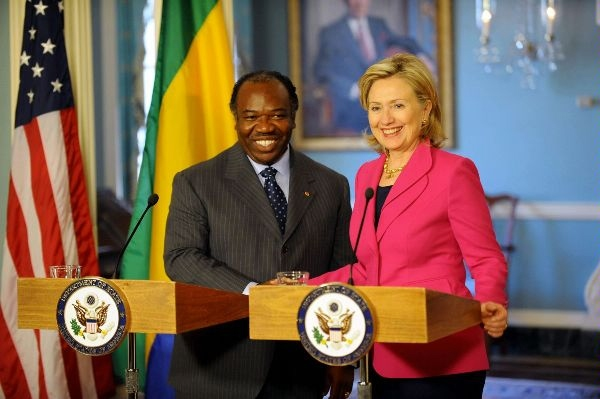

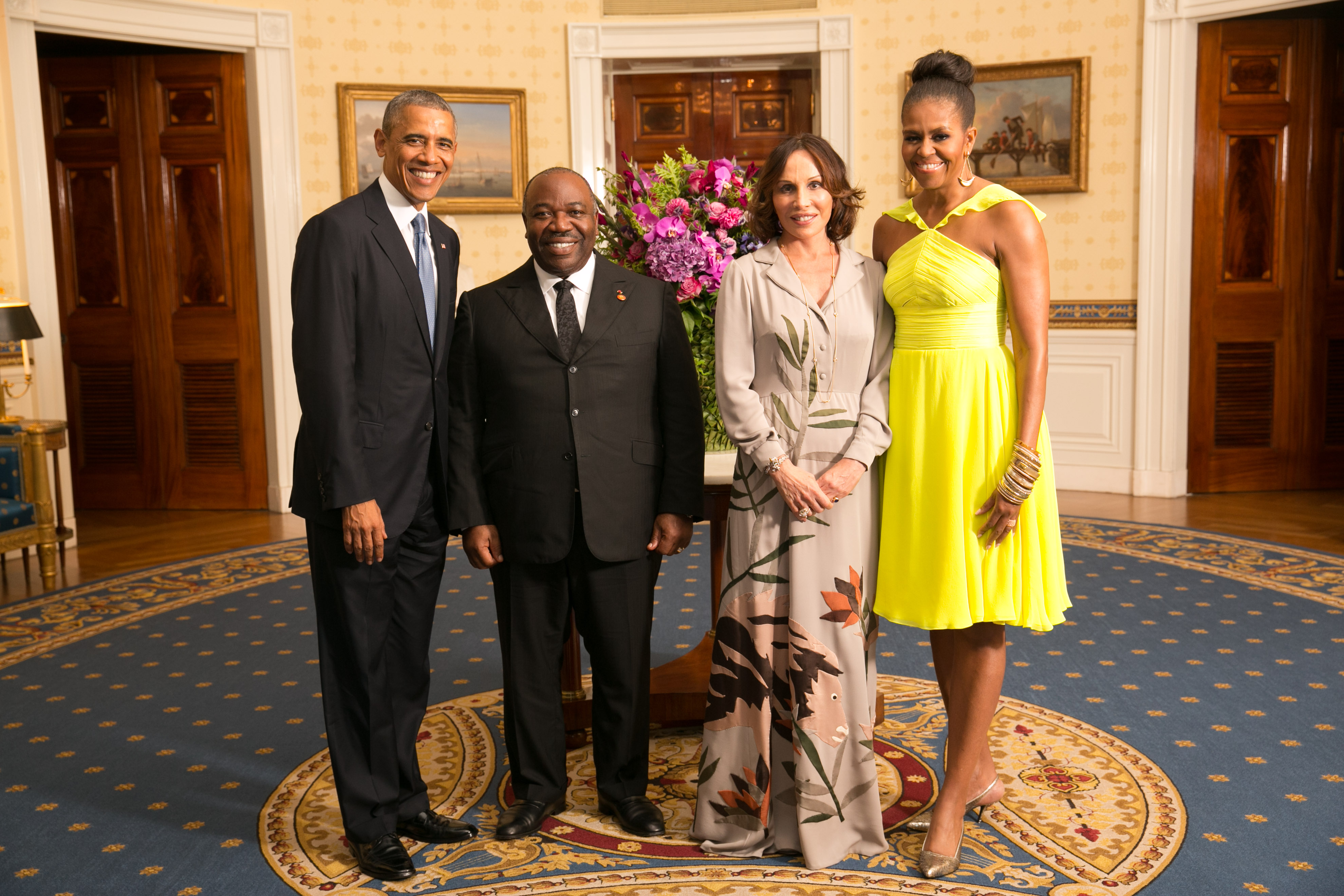

== Gambia ==
Table of trips
Dates	Guest	Title	Reason
May 15–18, 1989	Dawda Jawara	President	Met with President Bush during a private visit. Also visited Cornell University in Ithaca, New York and Cape Canaveral.
June 21–29, 2003	Yahya Jammeh	President	Attended United States-Africa Business Summit; met with President Bush during a private visit on June 26.
August 4–6, 2014	Yahya Jammeh	President	Attended the United States–Africa Leaders Summit.
August 5–6, 2015	Yahya Jammeh	President	Attended the United States–Africa Leaders Summit.

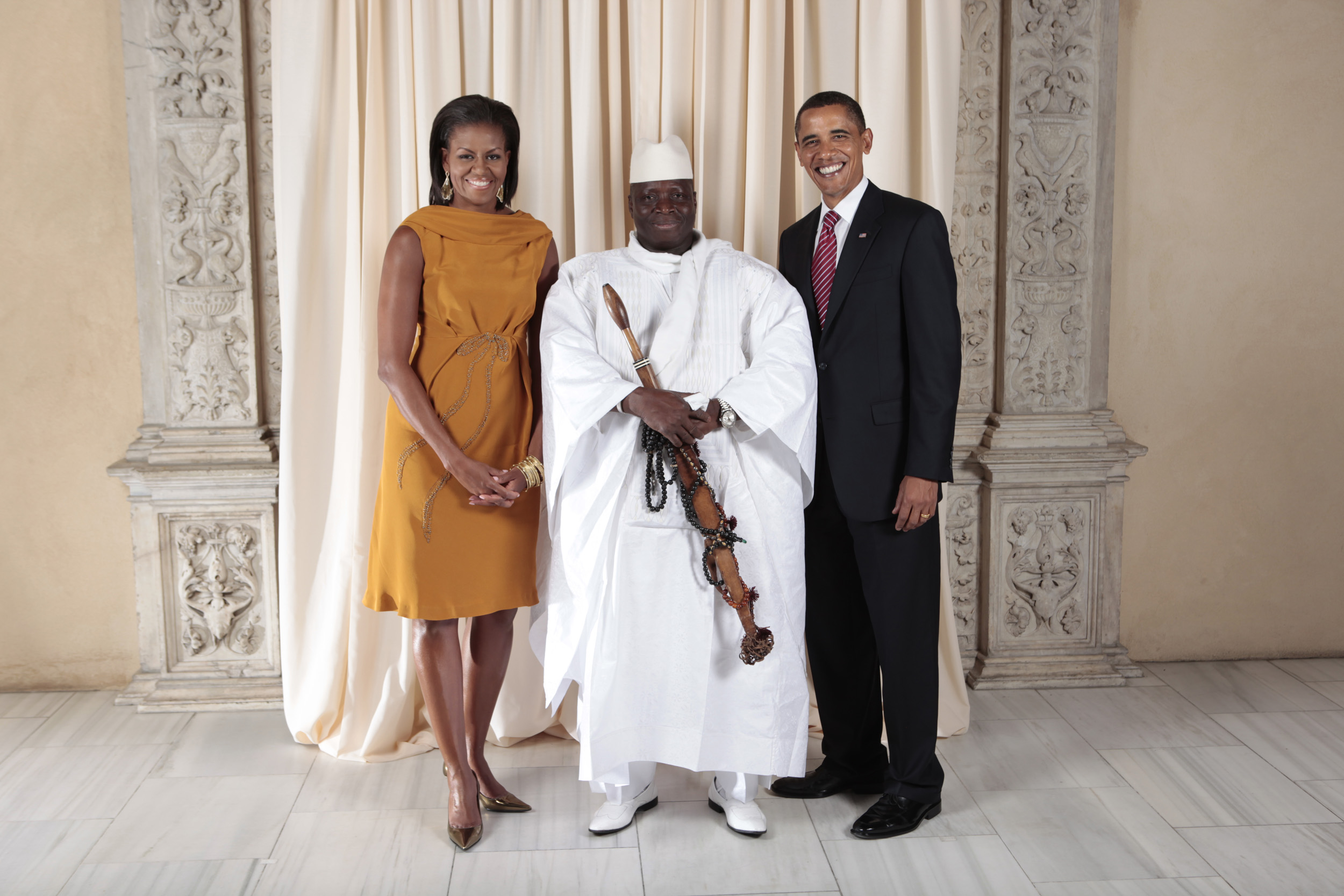

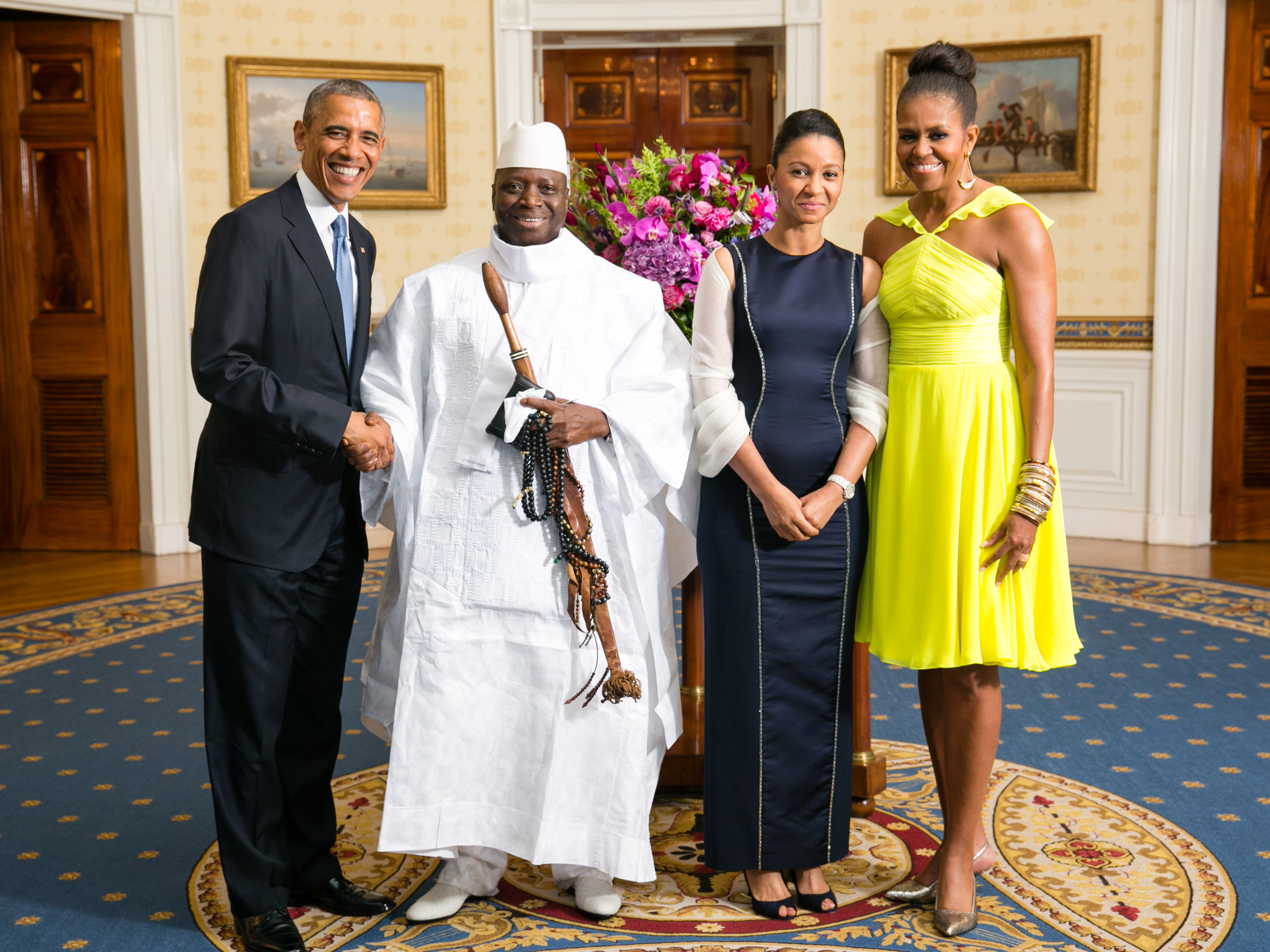

== Ghana ==
Table of trips
Dates	Guest	Title	Reason
July 23 – August 2, 1958	Kwame Nkrumah	Prime Minister	Official visit. Afterwards visited Pennsylvanian cities of Hershey, Harrisburg and Philadelphia, New York City, and Chicago.
September 22, 1960	Kwame Nkrumah	President	Met with President Eisenhower in New York City while attending a United Nations General Assembly session.
March 8, 1961	Kwame Nkrumah	President	Informal visit while attending a U.N. meeting.
October 9–14, 1967	Joseph Arthur Ankrah	Chairman	Private visit; visited Tampa, Cape Kennedy, and New York City.
October 20, 1969	Kofi Abrefa Busia	Prime Minister	Private visit
October 24, 1970	Kofi Abrefa Busia	Prime Minister	Attended a dinner at the White House on 25th anniversary of the U.N.
November 3–4, 1971	Kofi Abrefa Busia	Prime Minister	Private visit while en route to Mexico.
March 8–9, 1995	Jerry Rawlings	President	Official working visit
February 3–6, 1999	Jerry Rawlings	President	State visit
June 27–29, 2001	John Kufuor	President	Working visit; attended a forum of the Partnership to Cut Hunger in Africa.
September 24, 2003	John Kufuor	President	Met with President Bush at a U.N. General Assembly session in New York City.
June 9–10, 2004	John Kufuor	President	Met with President Bush at the 30th G8 summit in Sea Island, Georgia.
June 12–13, 2005	John Kufuor	President	Working visit; discussed the African Growth and Opportunity Act.
October 26, 2005	John Kufuor	President	Working visit.
April 11–13, 2006	John Kufuor	President	Working visit
September 14–17, 2008	John Kufuor	President	State visit
March 7–12, 2012	John Atta Mills	President	Working visit
August 4–6, 2014	John Dramani Mahama	President	Attended the United States–Africa Leaders Summit., then attended private event in Springfield, Missouri
September 21–27, 2014	John Dramani Mahama	President	Working visit; participated in the Climate Summit in New York City on September 23. Addressed the sixty-ninth session of the United Nations General Assembly in New York City on September 25. Delivered lectures at Harvard University in Cambridge, Massachusetts and at Brandeis University in Waltham, Massachusetts on September 26–27.
September 26–30, 2015	John Dramani Mahama	President	Working visit; co-hosted an event on health crisis with German Chancellor Angela Merkel and Norwegian Prime Minister Erna Solberg on September 26 in New York City. Also addressed the seventieth session of the United Nations General Assembly on September 30.

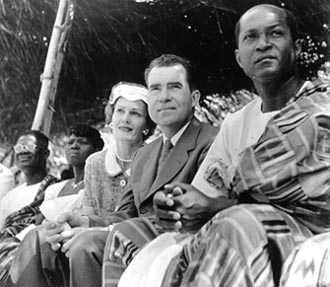

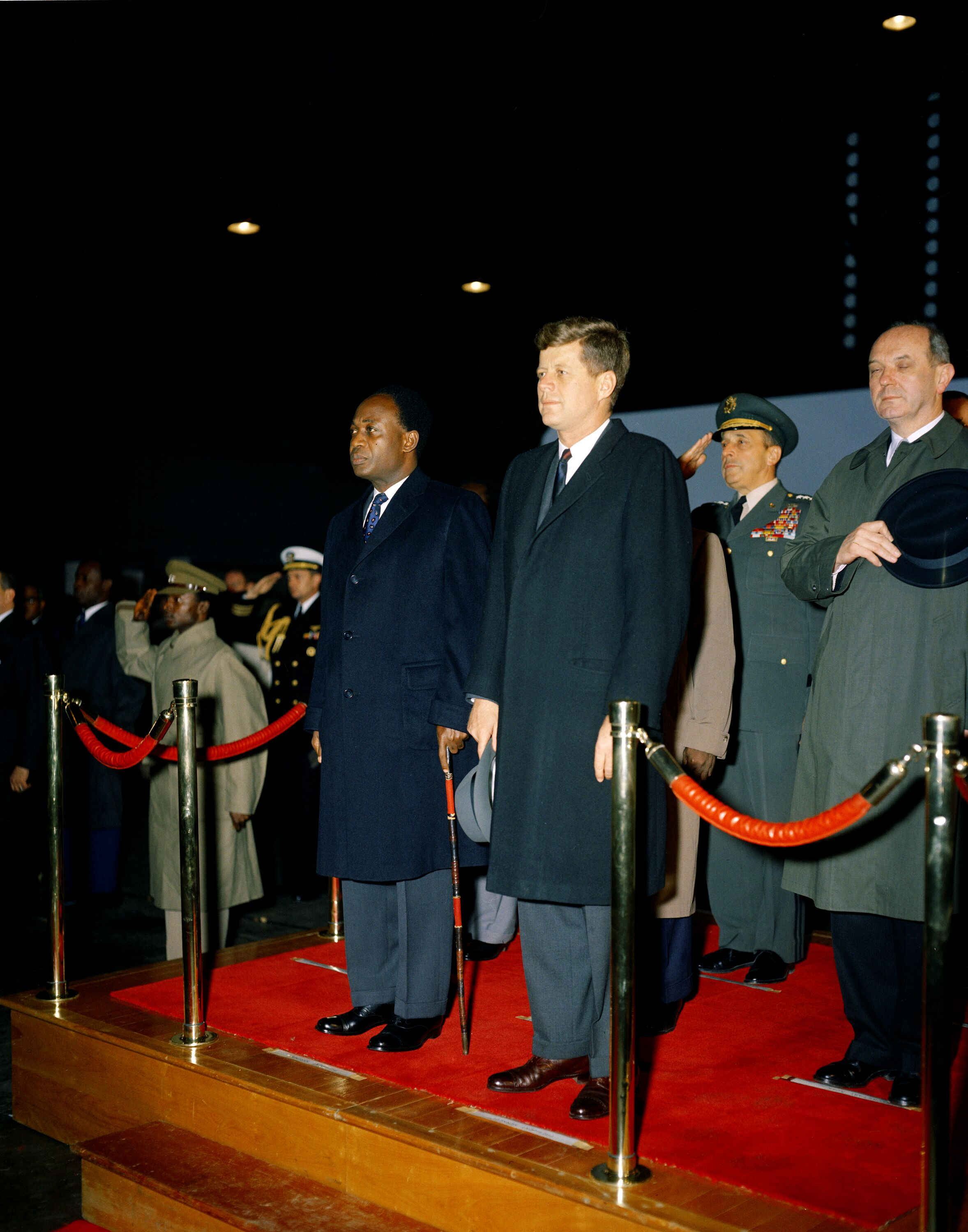

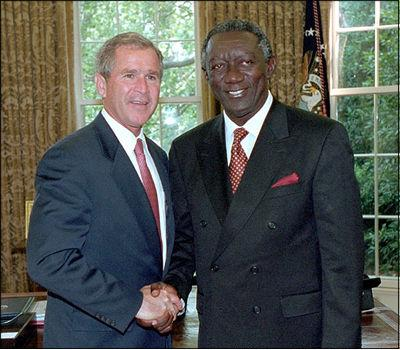

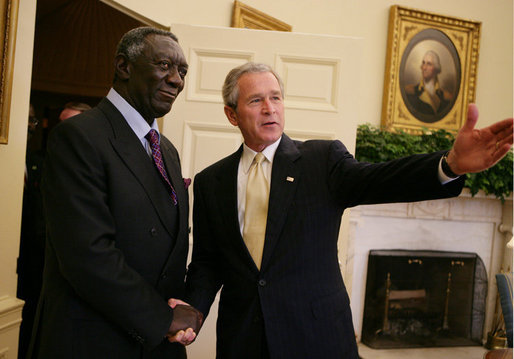

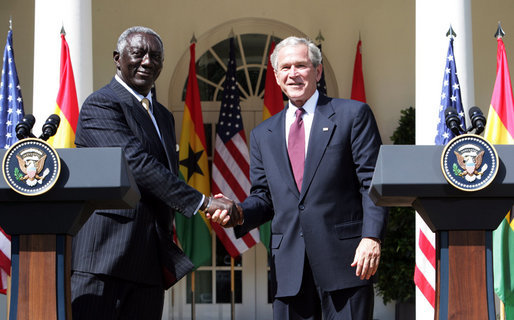

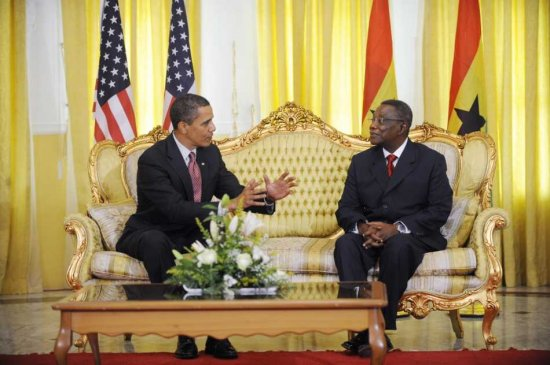

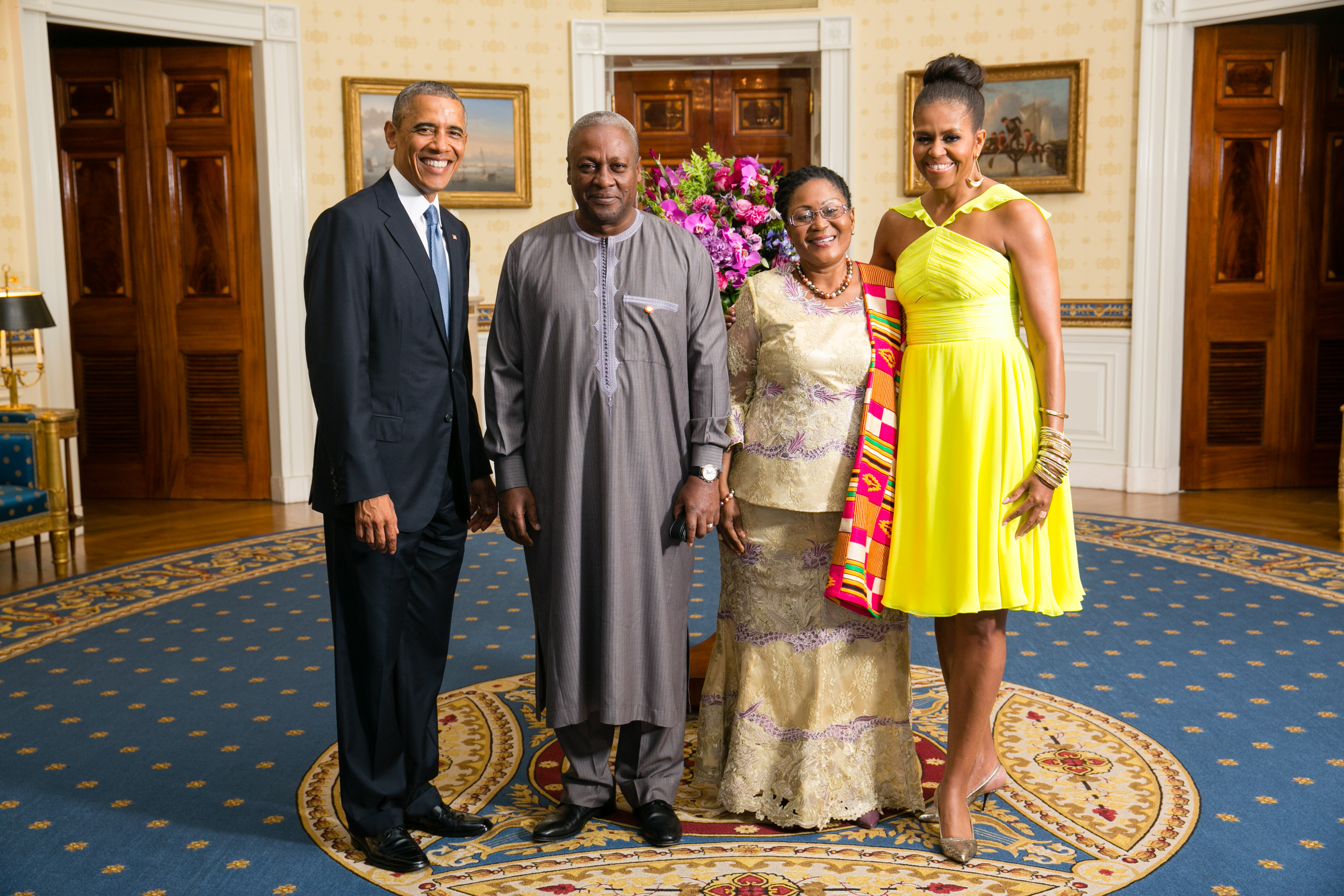

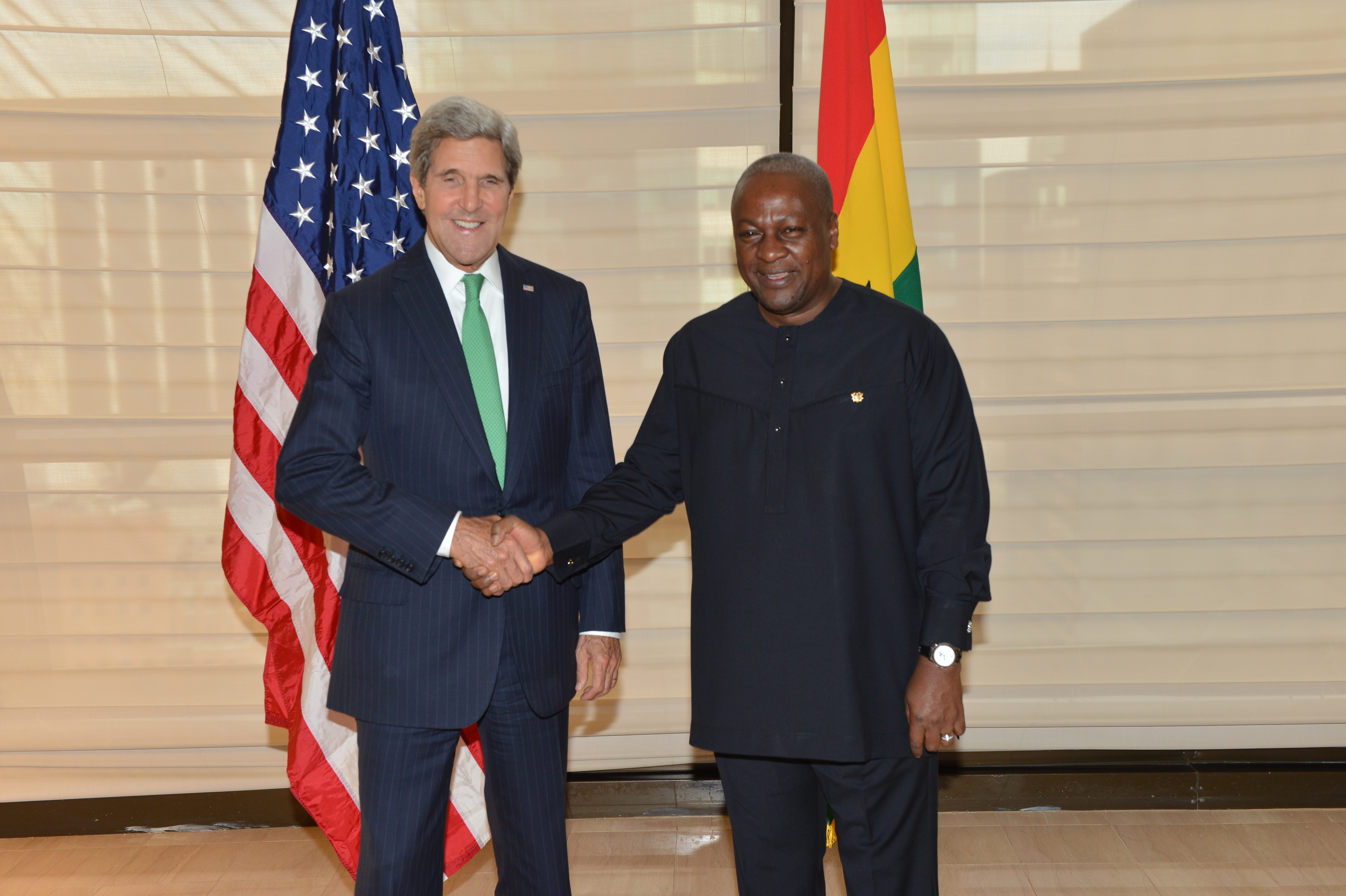

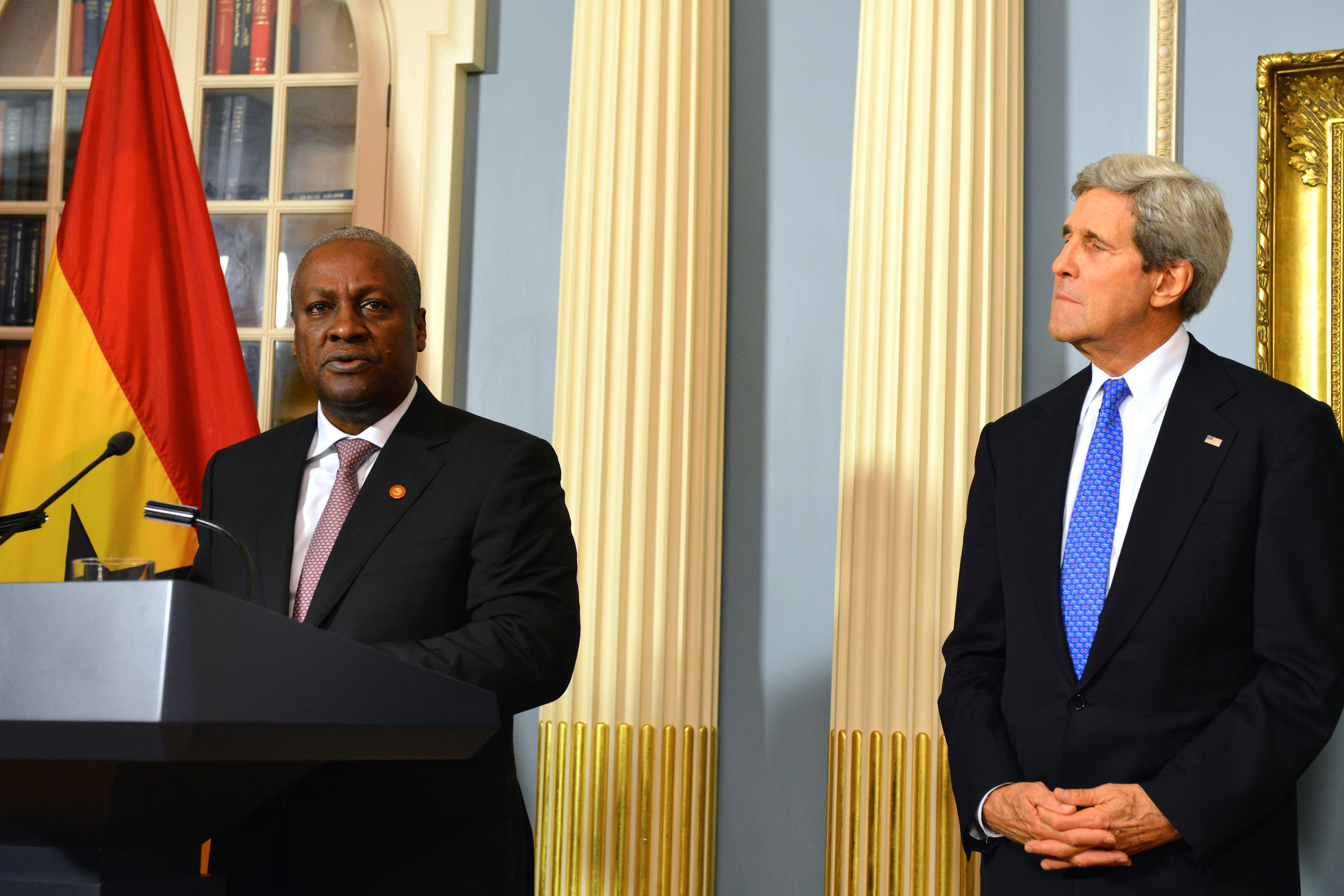

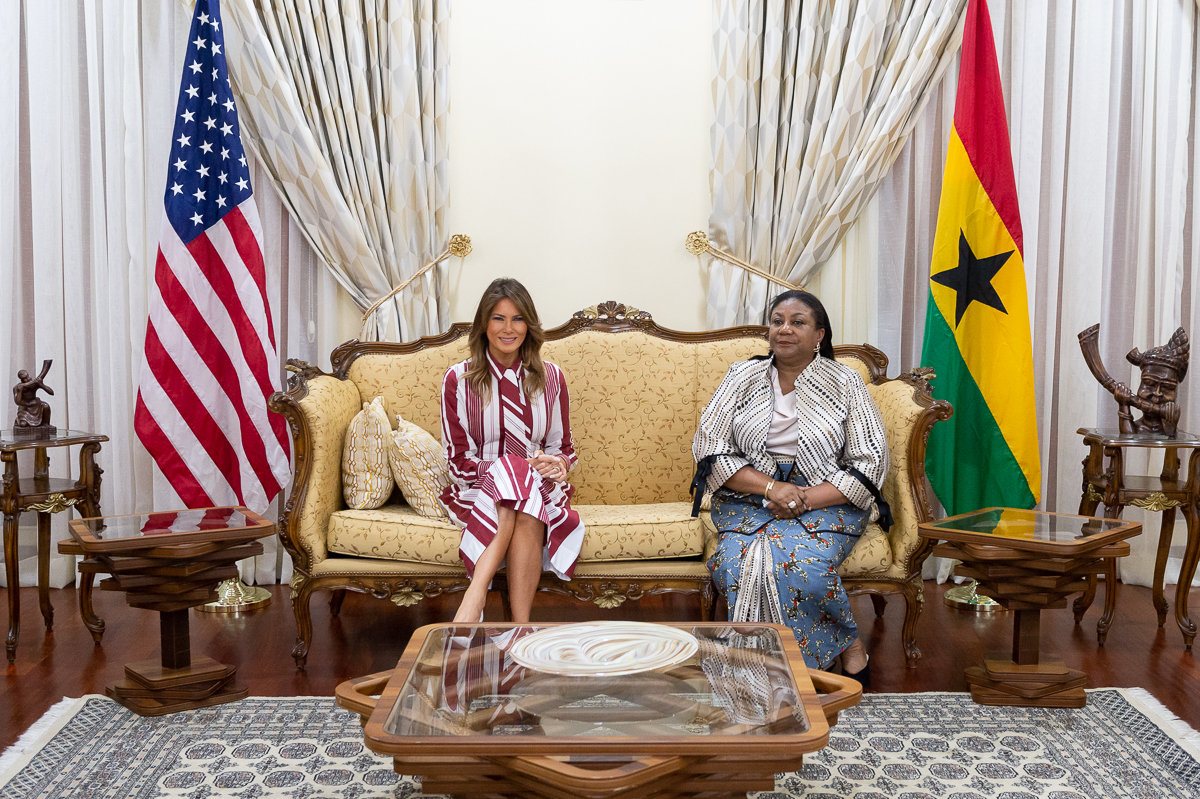

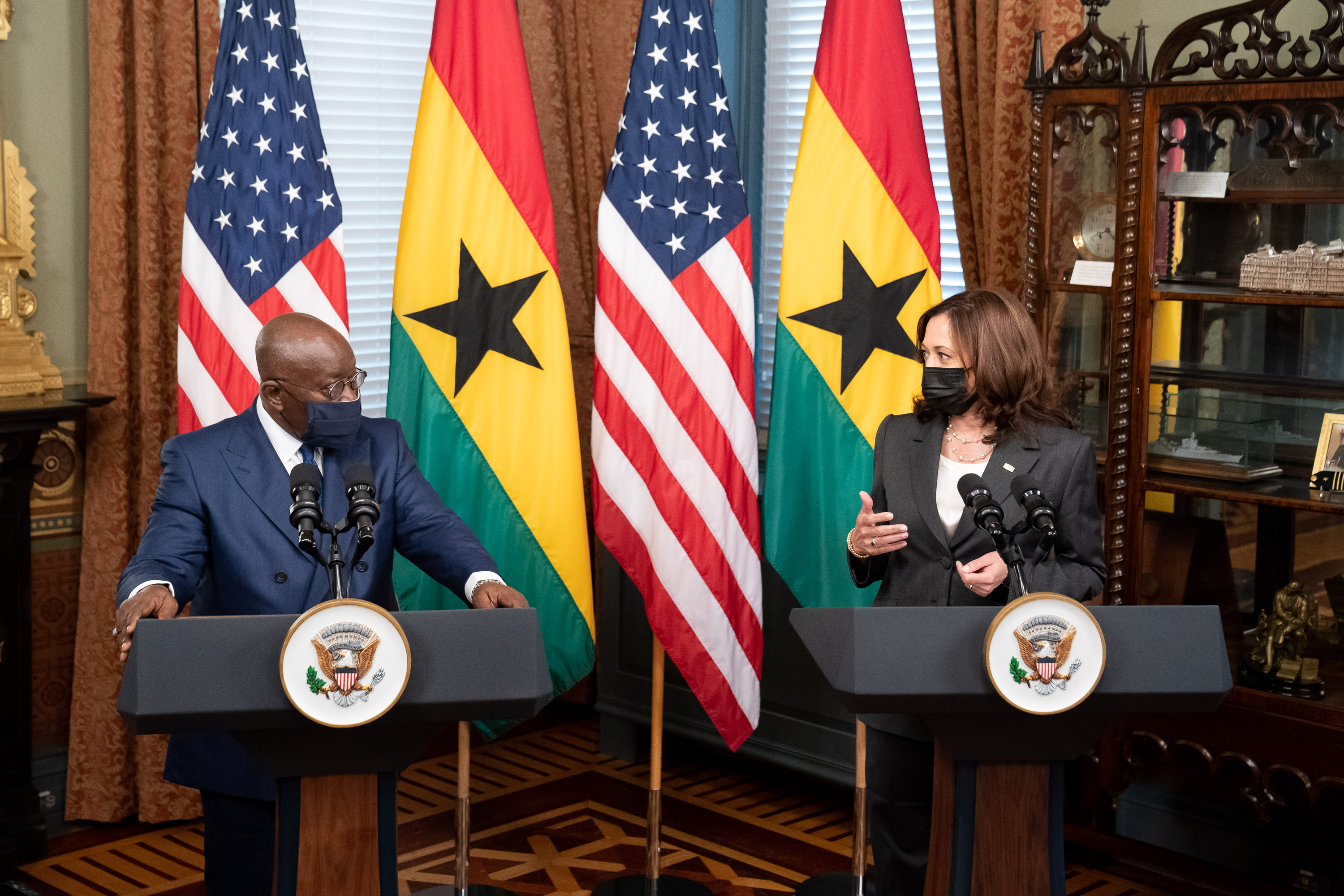

== Guinea ==
Table of trips
Dates	Guest	Title	Reason
October 25 – November 8, 1959	Ahmed Sékou Touré	President	State visit; also visited Raleigh, Chicago, Los Angeles, Wheeling, Omal, and New York City.
October 9–12, 1962	Ahmed Sékou Touré	President	Informal visit; visited New York City.
August 8–15, 1979	Ahmed Sékou Touré	President	Private visit; met with President Carter on August 8. Also visited Los Angeles, Denver, Pittsburgh, and New York City.
June 26 – July 3, 1982	Ahmed Sékou Touré	President	Private visit; met with President Reagan on June 30.
July 29, 2011	Alpha Condé	President	Working visit
August 4–6, 2014	Alpha Condé	President	Attended the United States–Africa Leaders Summit.
April 15, 2015	Alpha Condé	President	Attended the Africa Leaders Ebola Meeting.

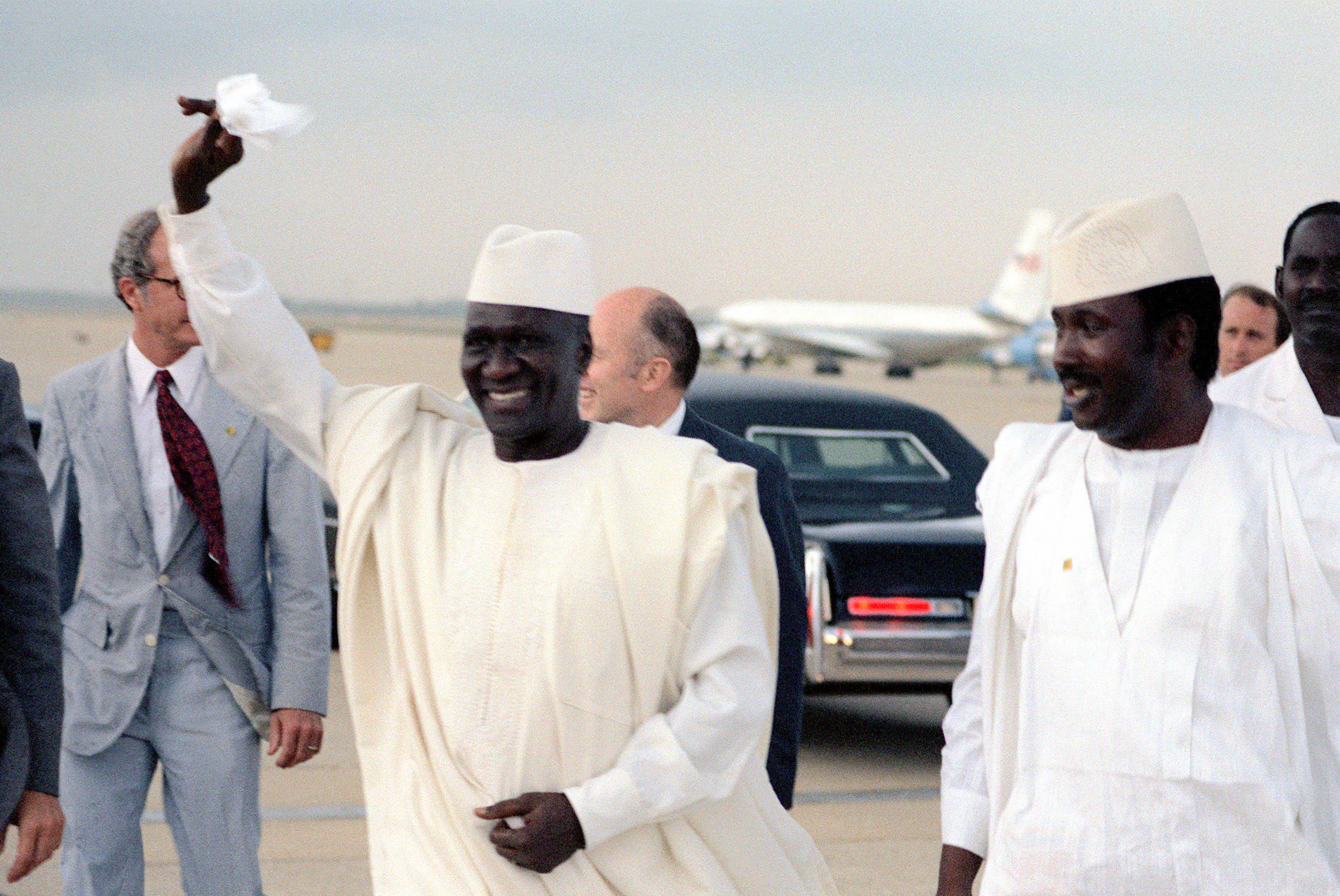

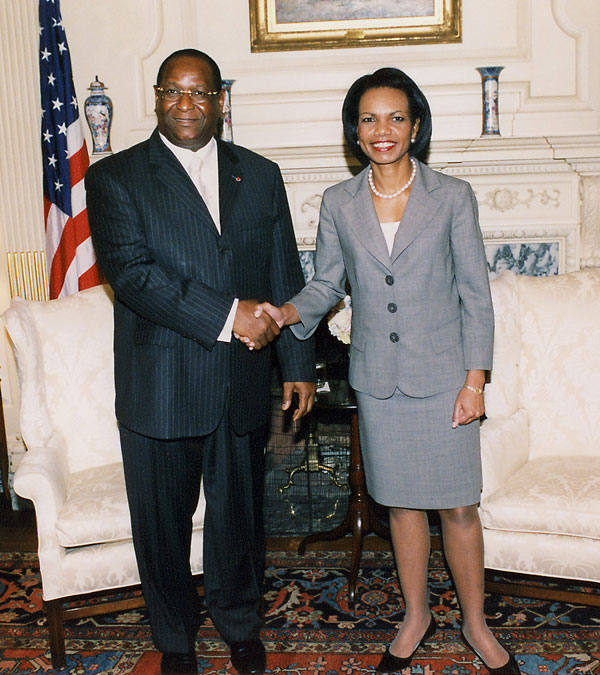

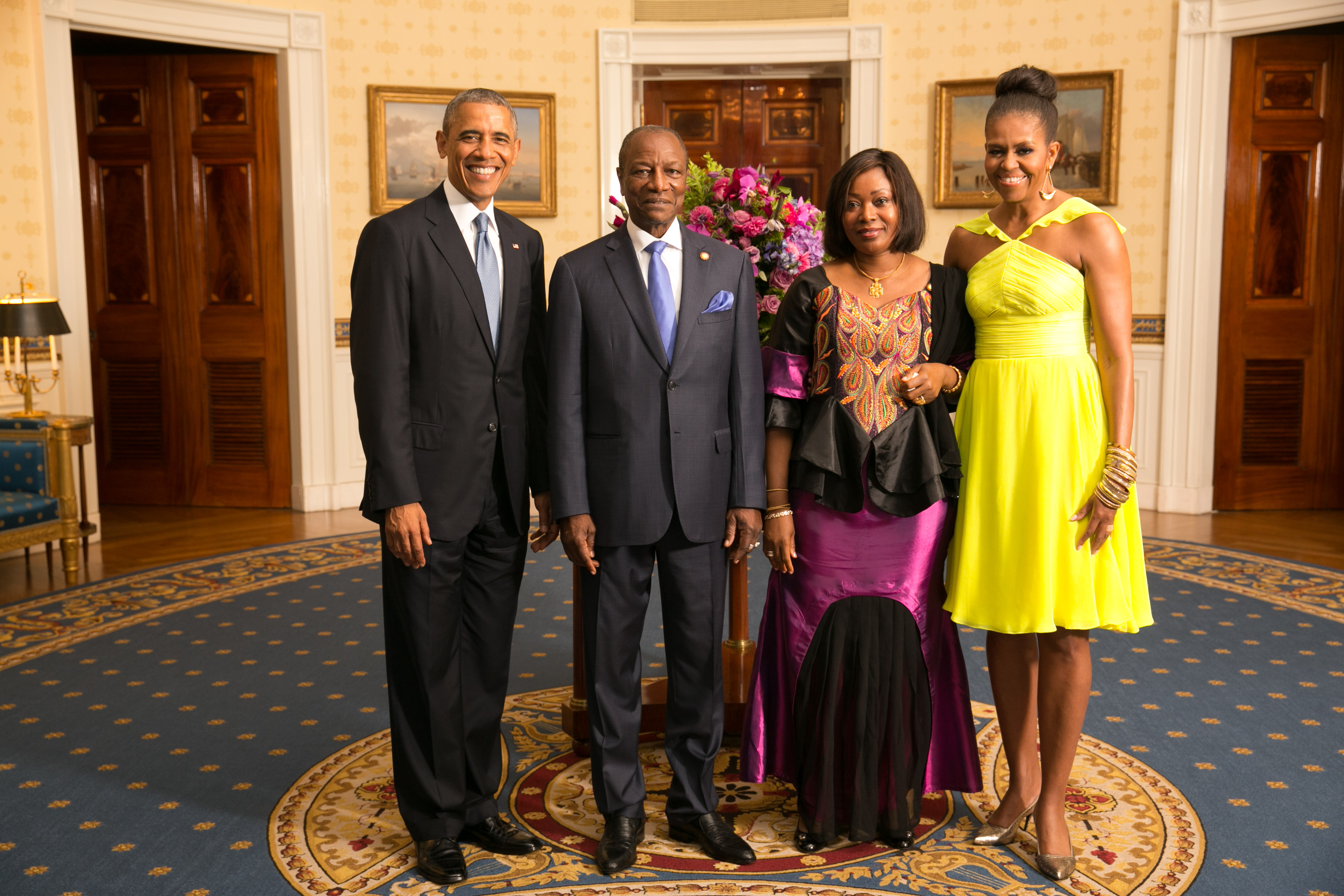

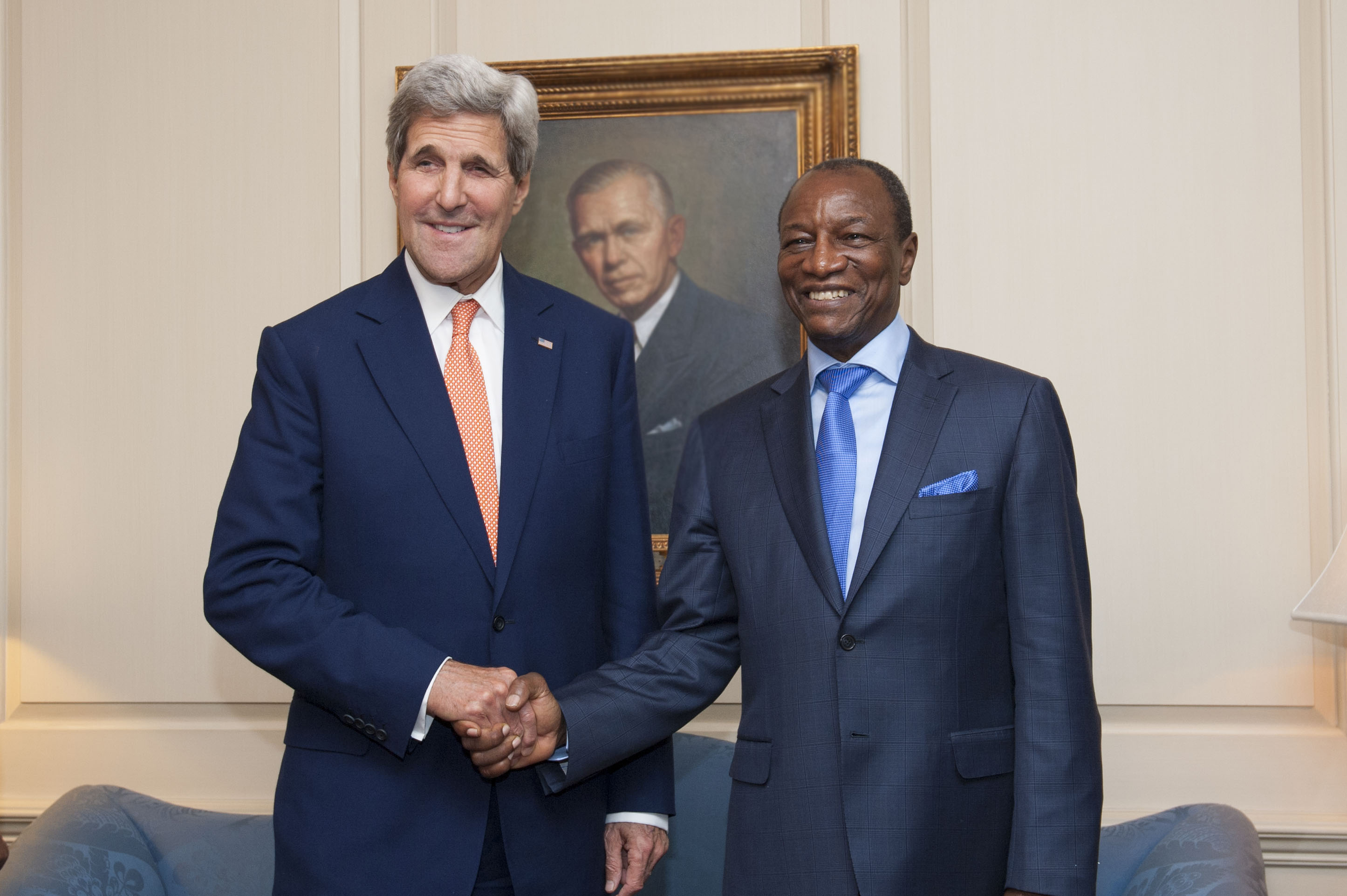

== Guinea-Bissau ==
Table of trips
Dates	Guest	Title	Reason
October 19, 1995	Manuel Saturnino da Costa	Prime Minister	Attended an Africare dinner with President Clinton.
August 4–6, 2014	José Mário Vaz	President	Attended the United States–Africa Leaders Summit.

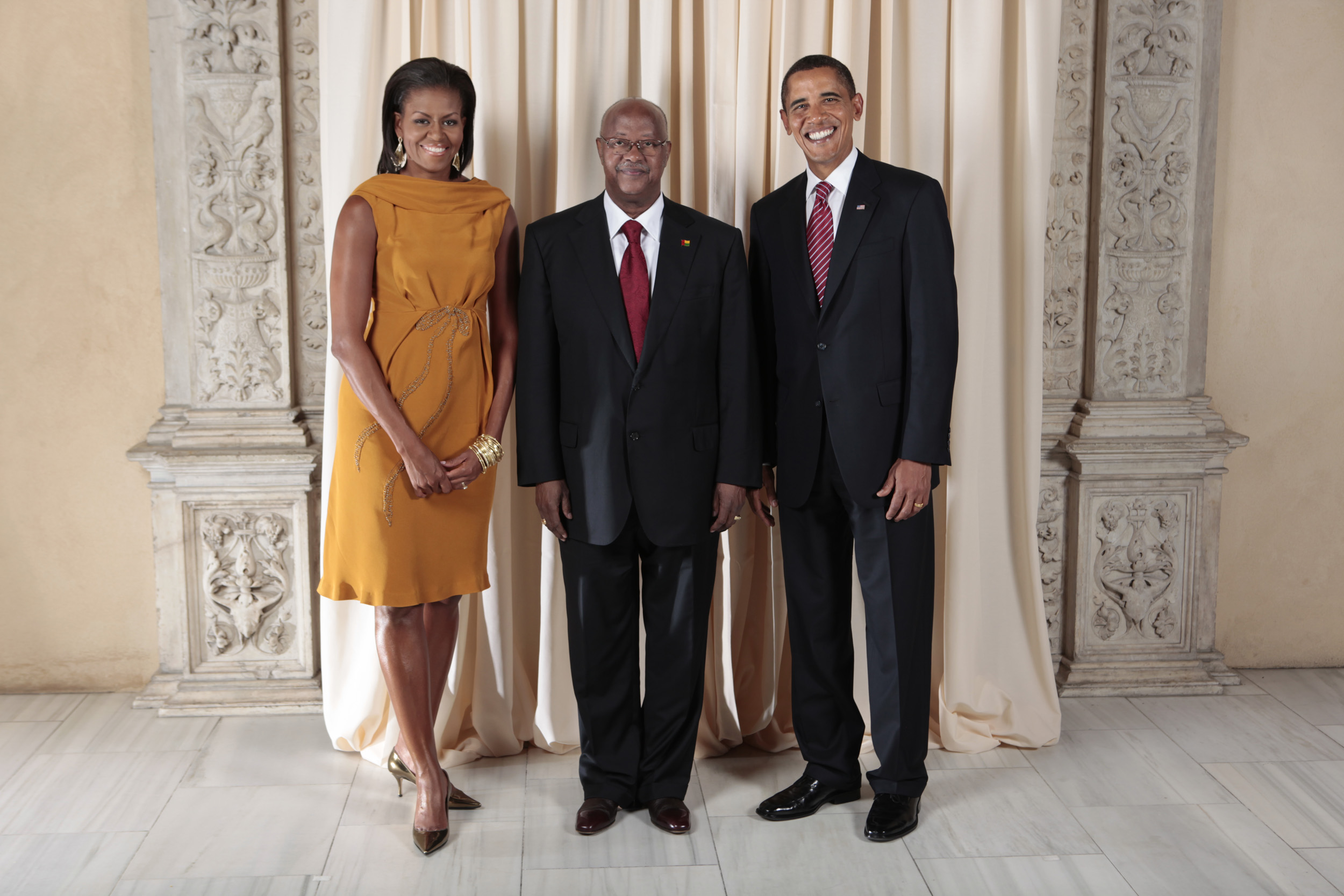

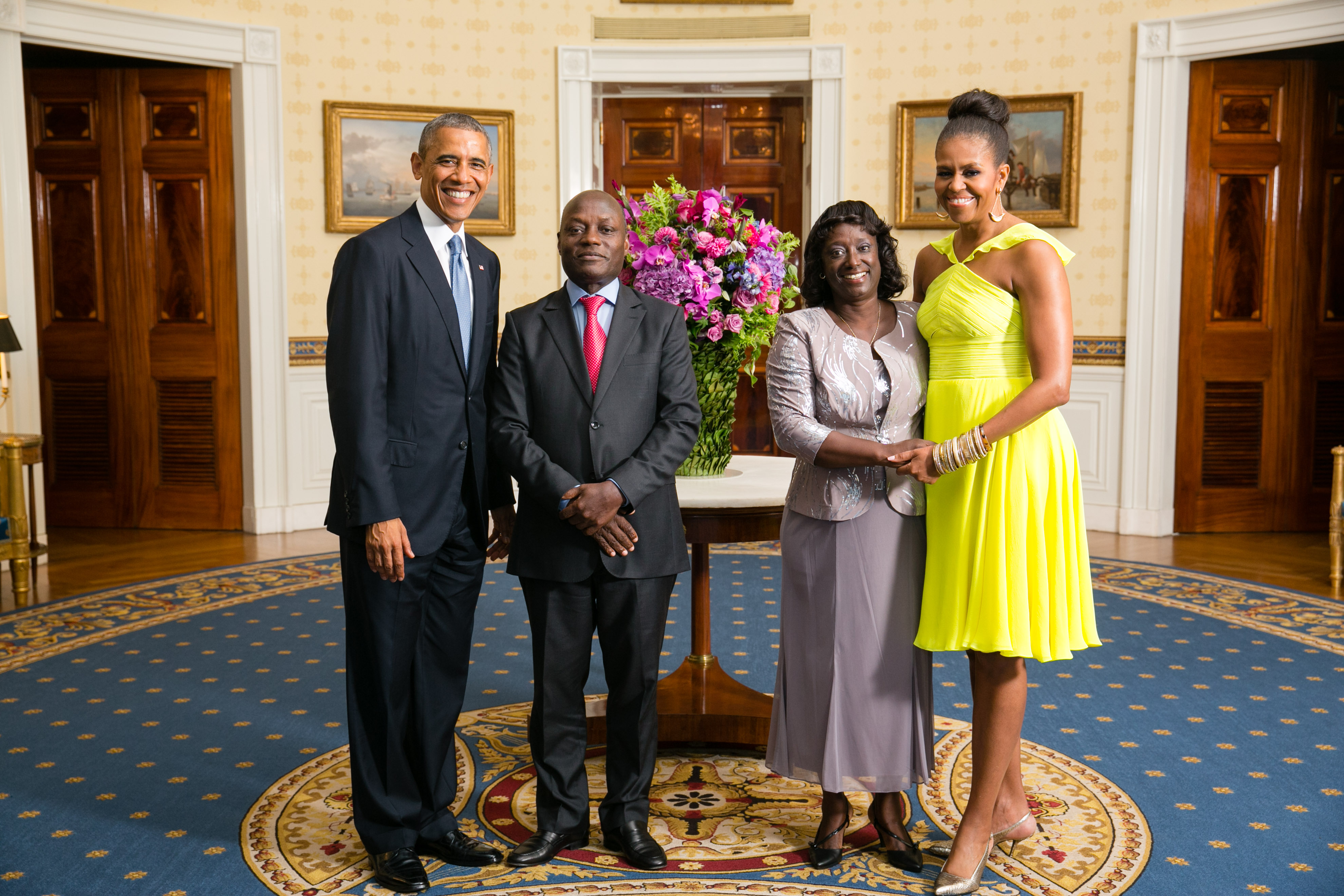

== Ivory Coast (Côte d'Ivoire) ==
Table of trips
Dates	Guest	Title	Reason
May 5–29, 1962	Félix Houphouët-Boigny	President	State visit. Private visit to New York City on May 5–15. Later visited Boston and Philadelphia.
August 17 – September 1, 1967	Félix Houphouët-Boigny	President	Official visit. Private visit to New York City on August 26 – September 1.
October 8–18, 1973	Félix Houphouët-Boigny	President	State visit. Afterwards visited Los Angeles, San Francisco, and New York City (private visit after October 15).
June 6–20, 1983	Félix Houphouët-Boigny	President	State visit; visited New York City.
July 29, 2011	Alassane Ouattara	President	Working visit
August 4–6, 2014	Daniel Kablan Duncan	Prime Minister	Attended the U.S.-Africa Leaders' Summit.
December 13–15, 2022	Patrick Achi	Prime Minister	Attended the U.S.-Africa Leaders' Summit.

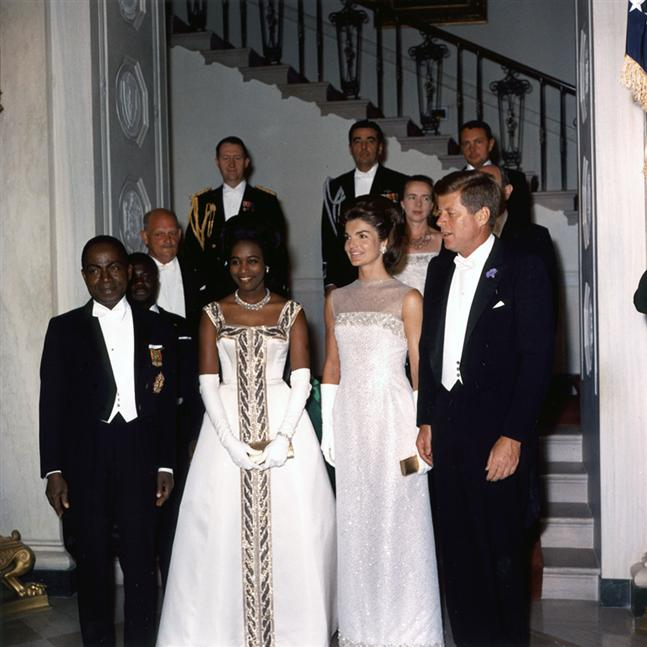

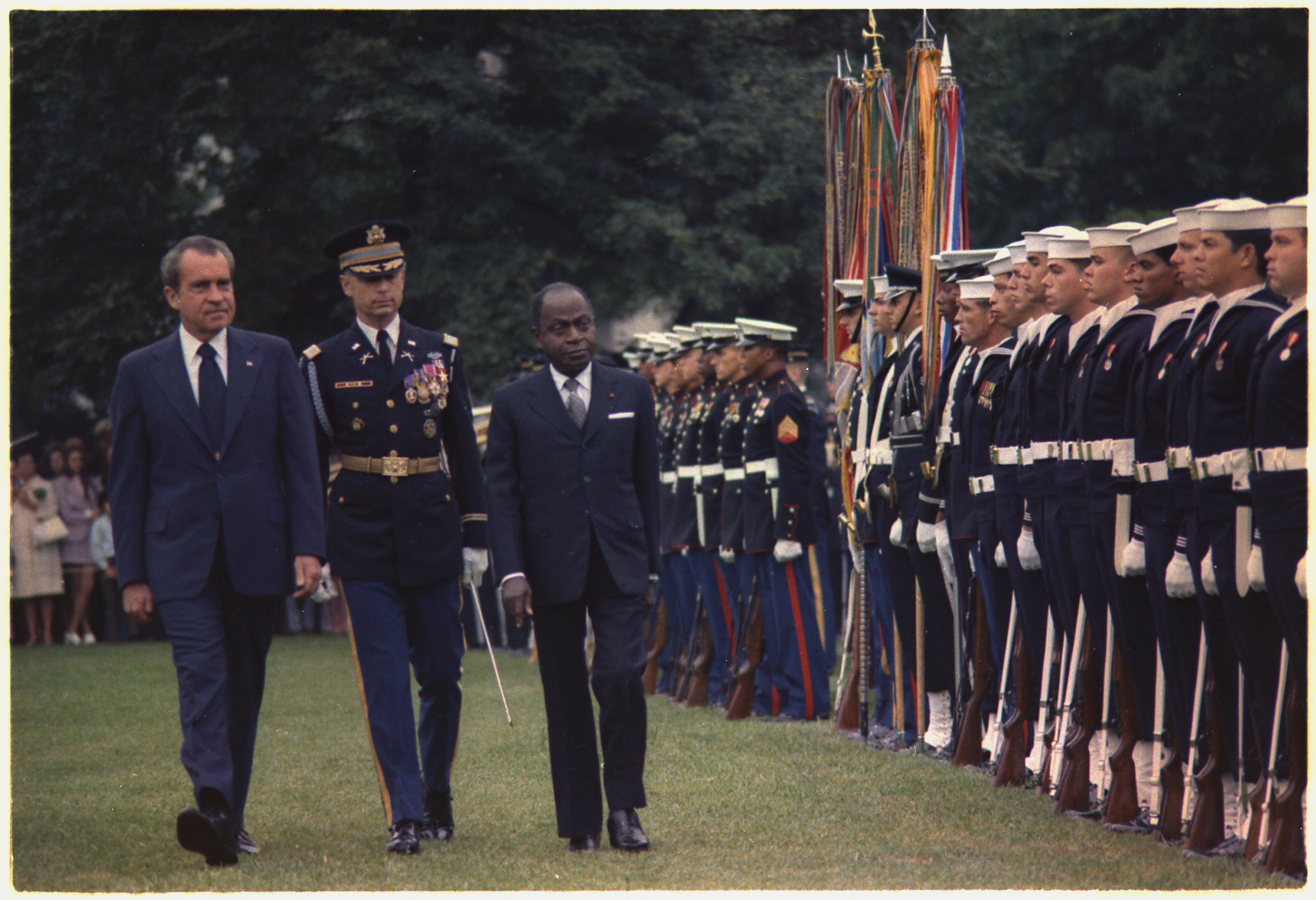

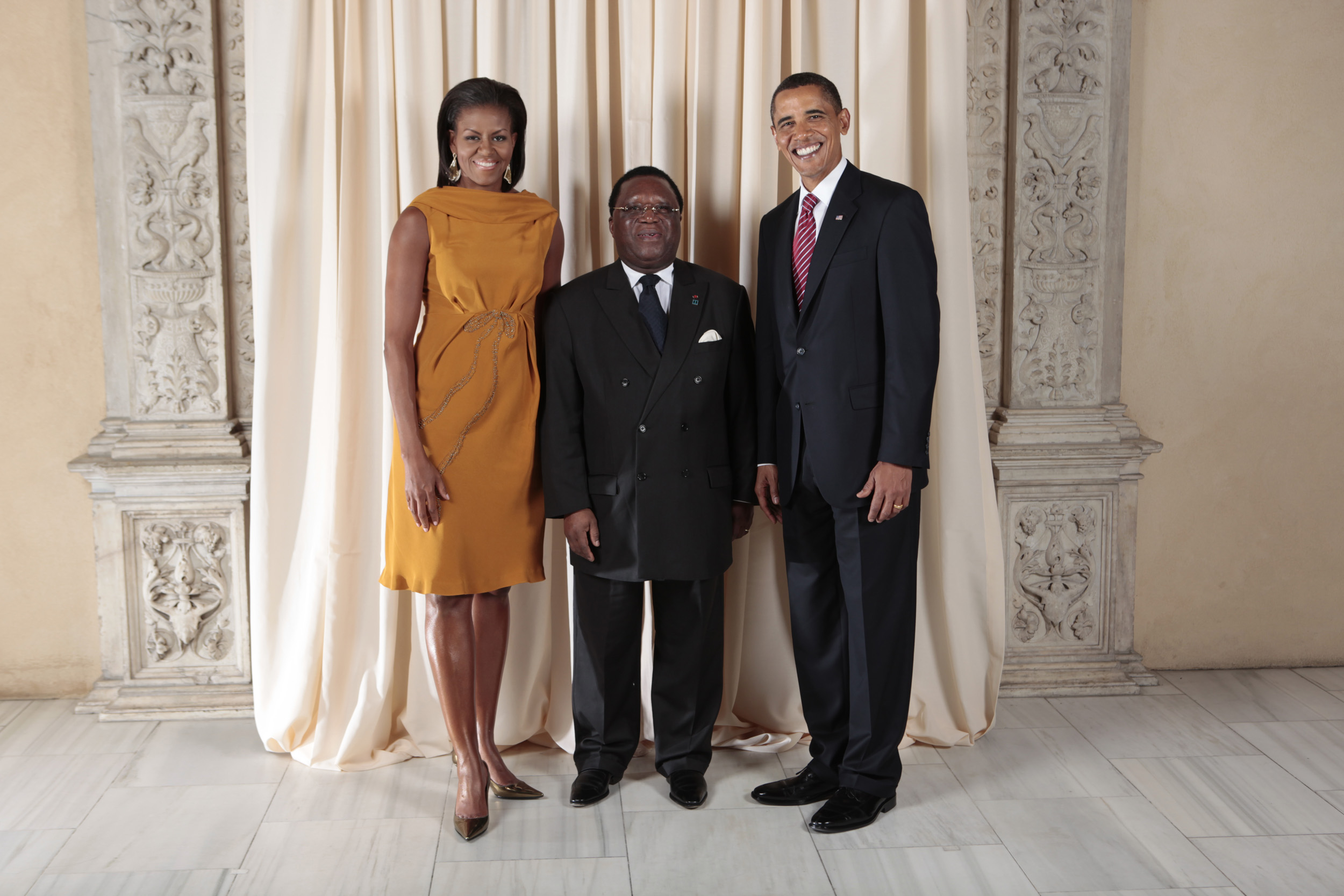

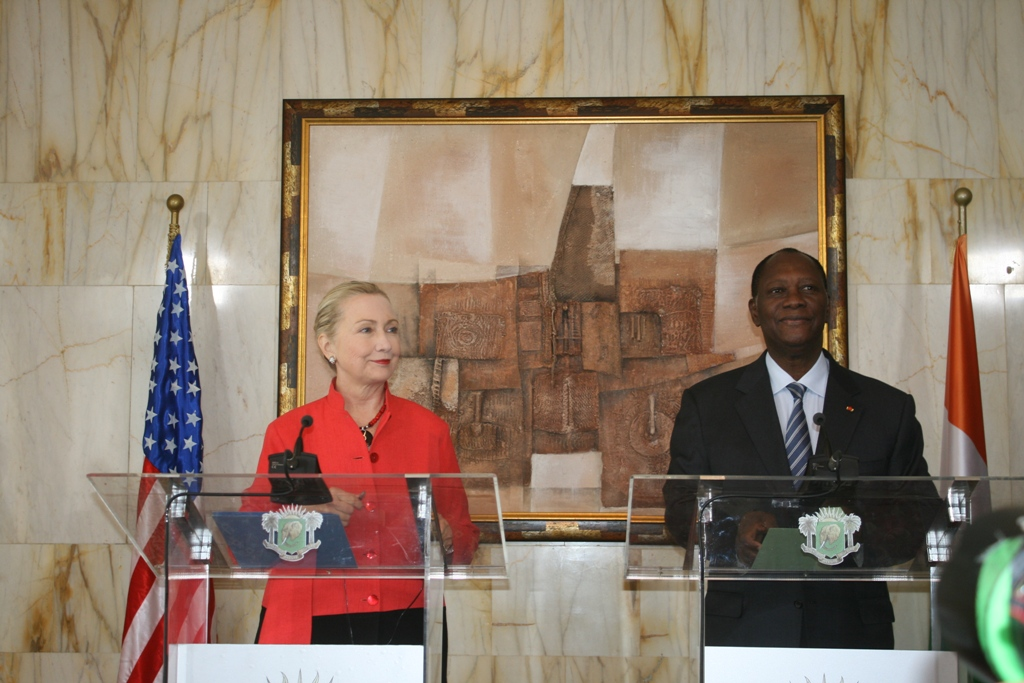

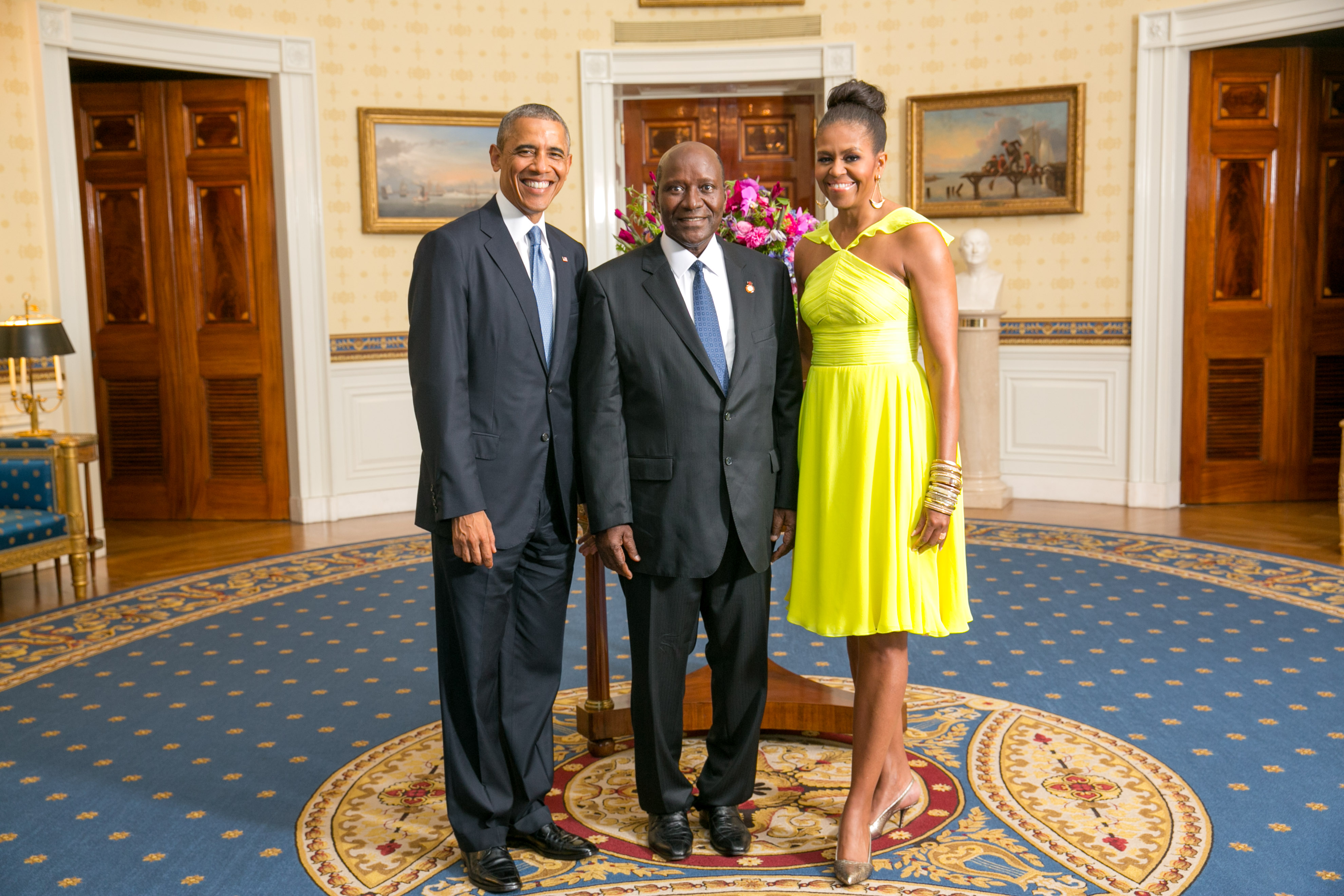

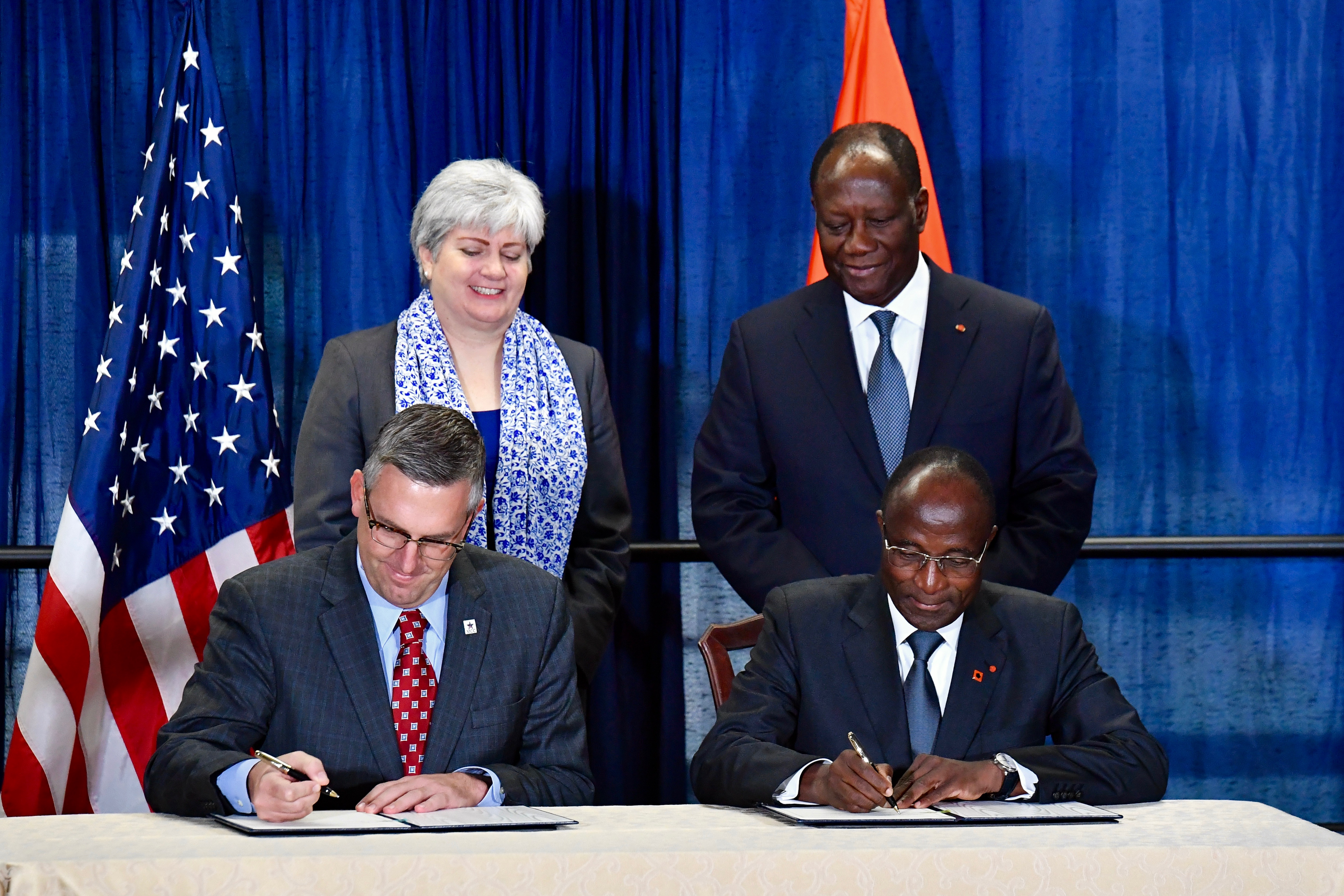

== Kenya ==
Table of trips
Dates	Guest	Title	Reason
February 19–22, 1980	Daniel arap Moi	President	State visit
September 24–26, 1981	Daniel arap Moi	President	Private visit en route to the United Nations General Assembly. Met with President Reagan on September 25.
May 11–14, 1987	Daniel arap Moi	President	Official working visit. Also visited New York City on March 14.
December 4–6, 2002	Daniel arap Moi	President	Working visit
October 5–7, 2003	Mwai Kibaki	President	State visit
September 23, 2010	Mwai Kibaki	President	Attended the United Nations General Assembly
August 4–6, 2014	Uhuru Kenyatta	President	Attended the United States–Africa Leaders Summit.
April 20–27, 2015	Uhuru Kenyatta	President	Working visit; attended the Milken Institute Global Conference in Los Angeles.
September 24 – October 8, 2015	Uhuru Kenyatta	President	Working visit; attended the seventieth session of the United Nations General Assembly in New York City. Met with British Prime Minister David Cameron and Pope Francis.
August 25–27, 2018	Uhuru Kenyatta	President	Working visit
February 6, 2020	Uhuru Kenyatta	President	Working visit
October 11–15, 2021	Uhuru Kenyatta	President	Working visit
September 20–24, 2022	William Ruto	President	Attended the 77th Session of the United Nations General Assembly
May 23, 2024	William Ruto	President	State visit.

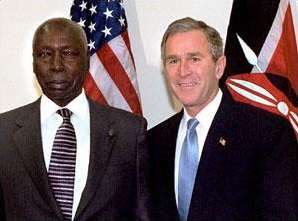

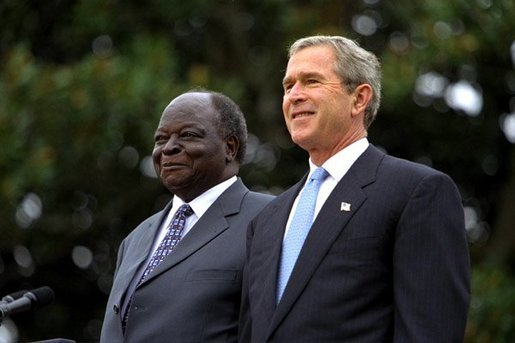

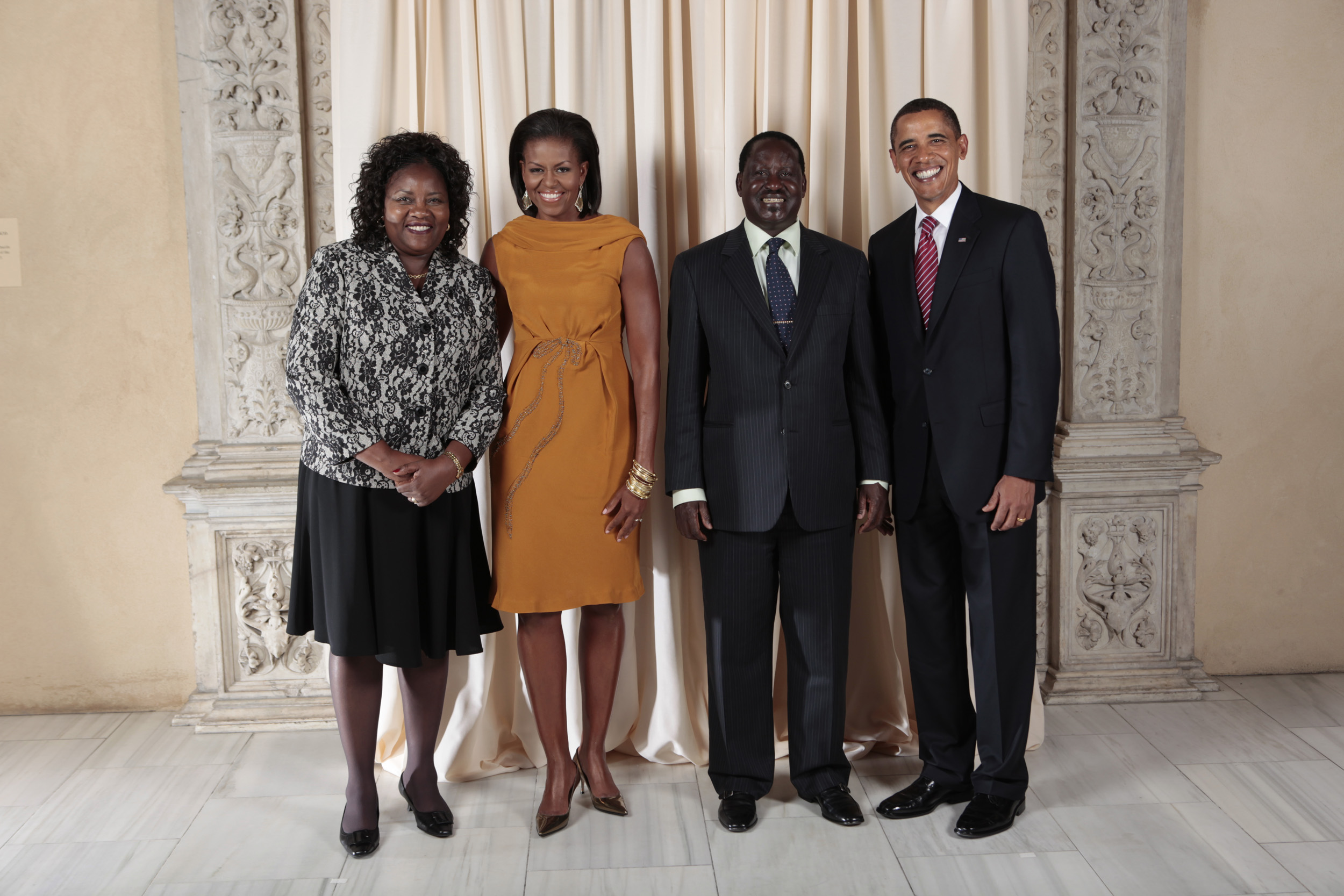

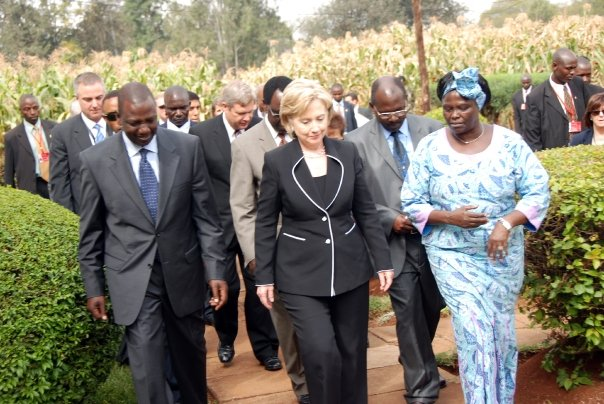

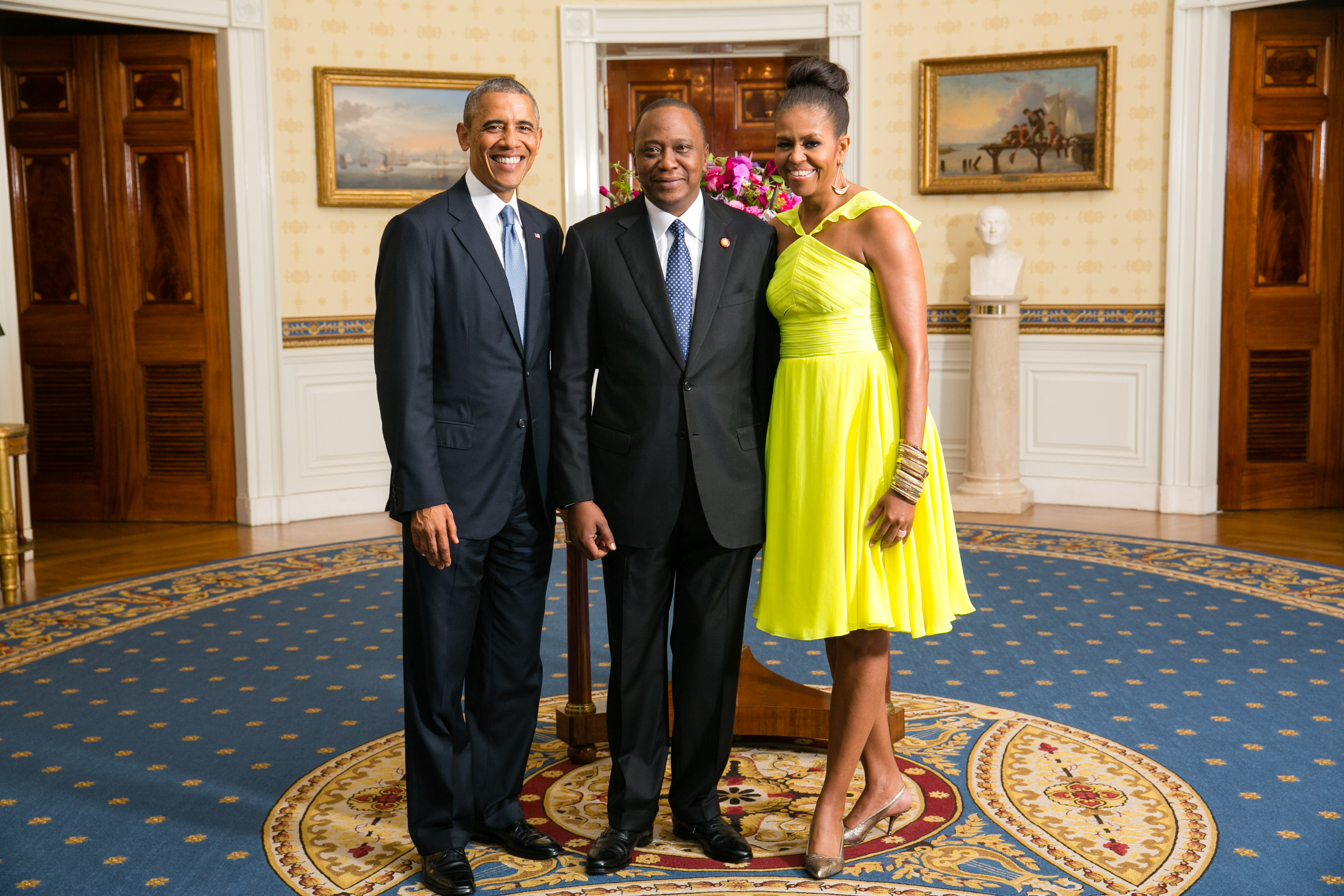

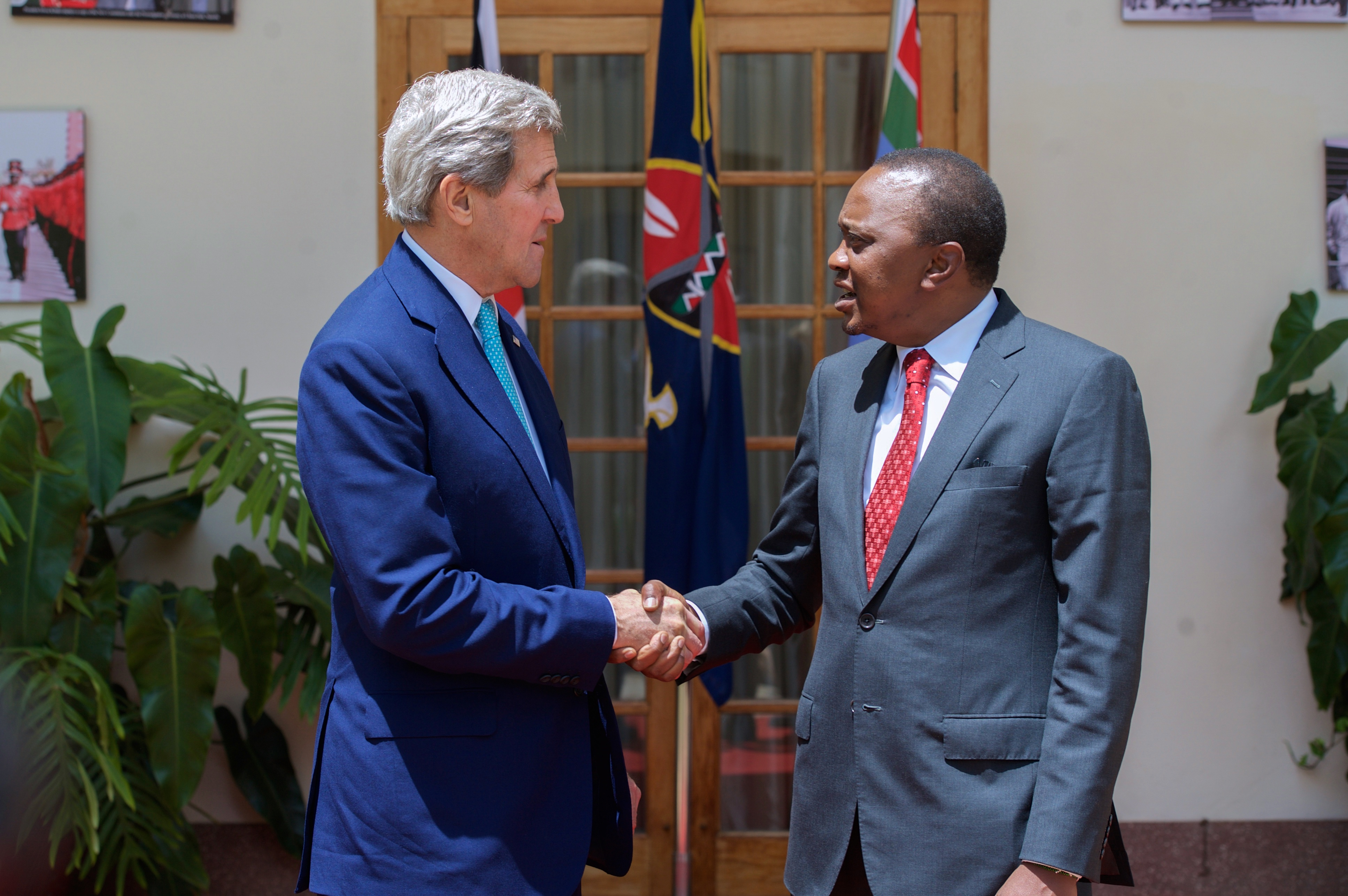

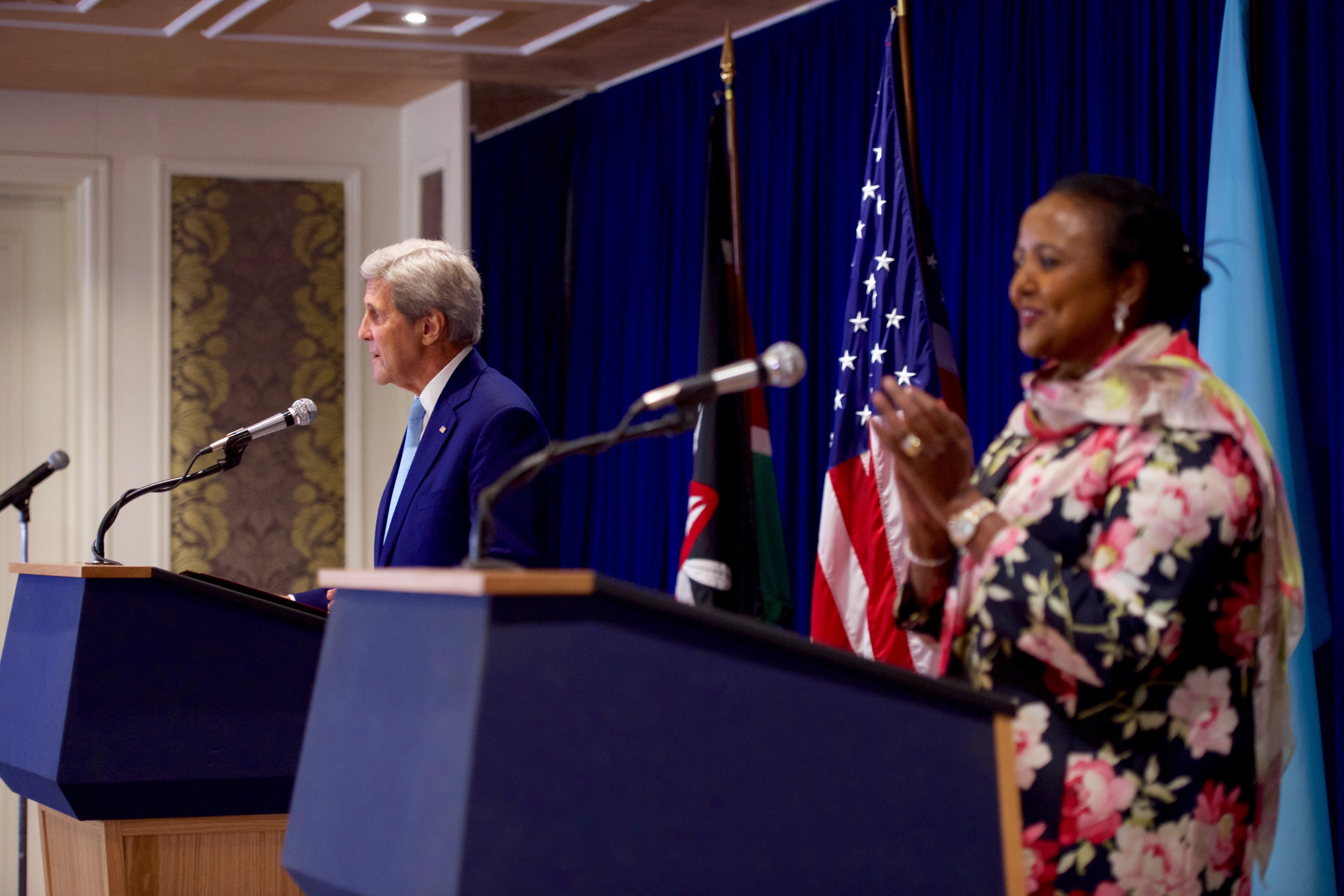

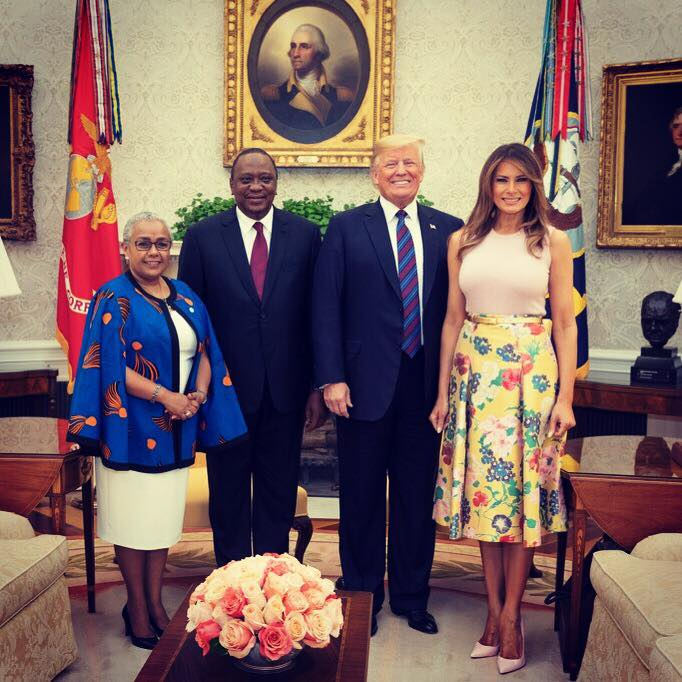

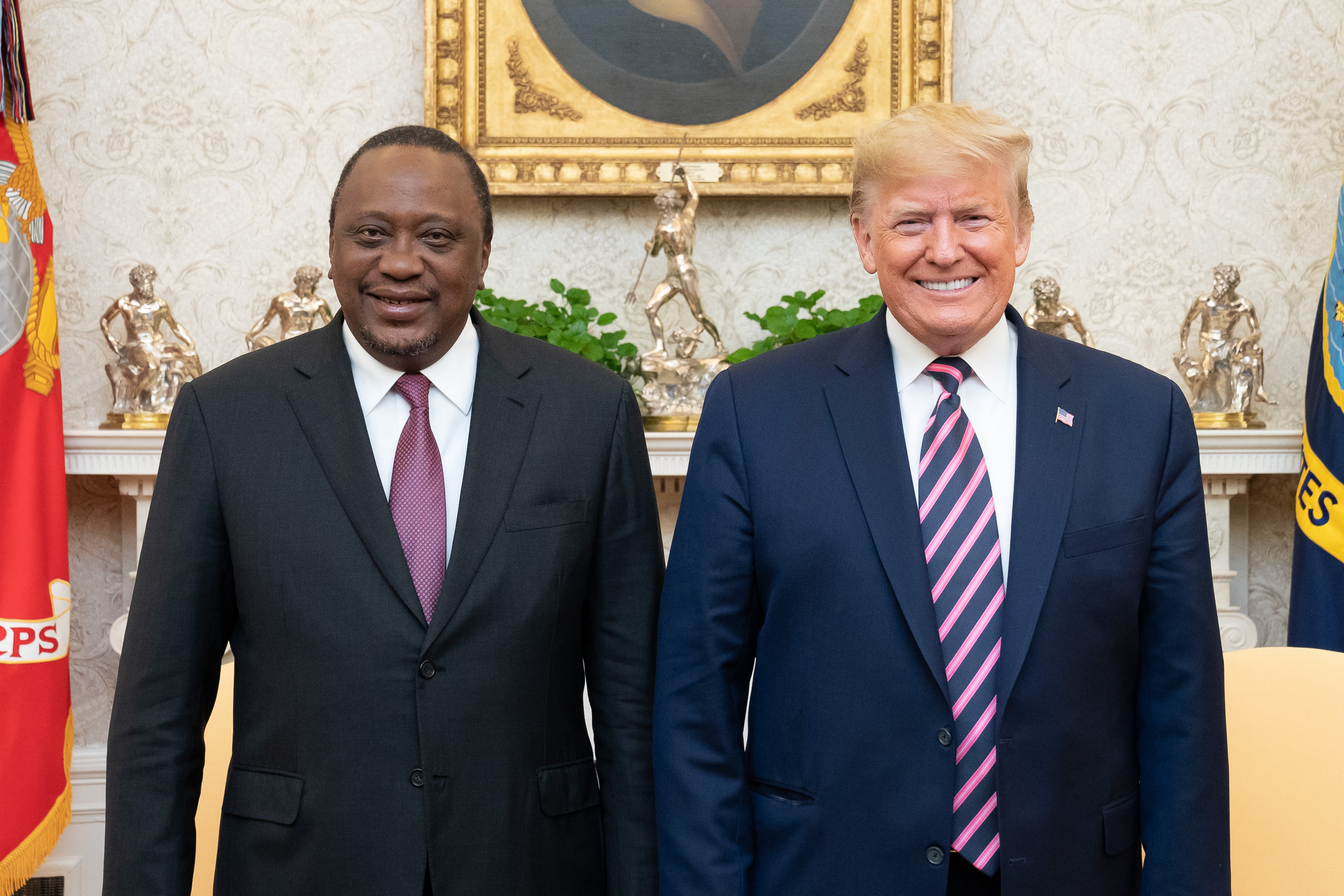

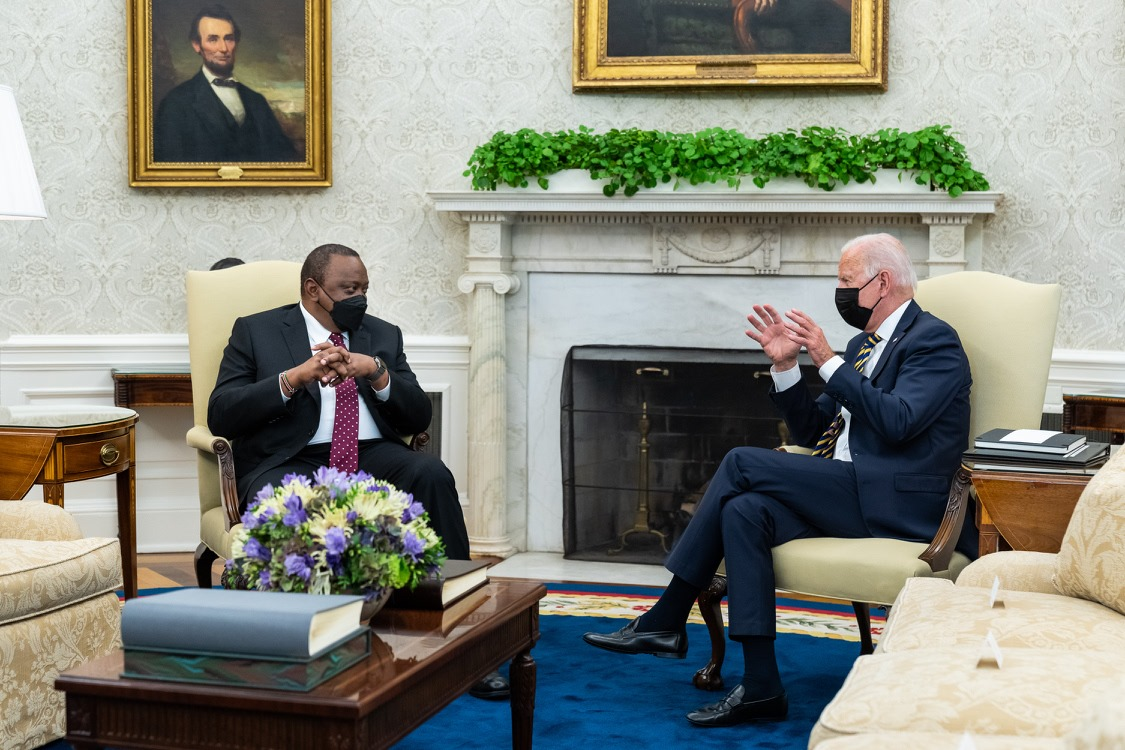

== Lesotho ==
Table of trips
Dates	Guest	Title	Reason
August 22 – September 30, 1967	Leabua Jonathan	Prime Minister	Informal visit. Afterwards visited New York City and San Diego.
August 4–6, 2014	Tom Thabane	Prime Minister	Attended the United States–Africa Leaders Summit.

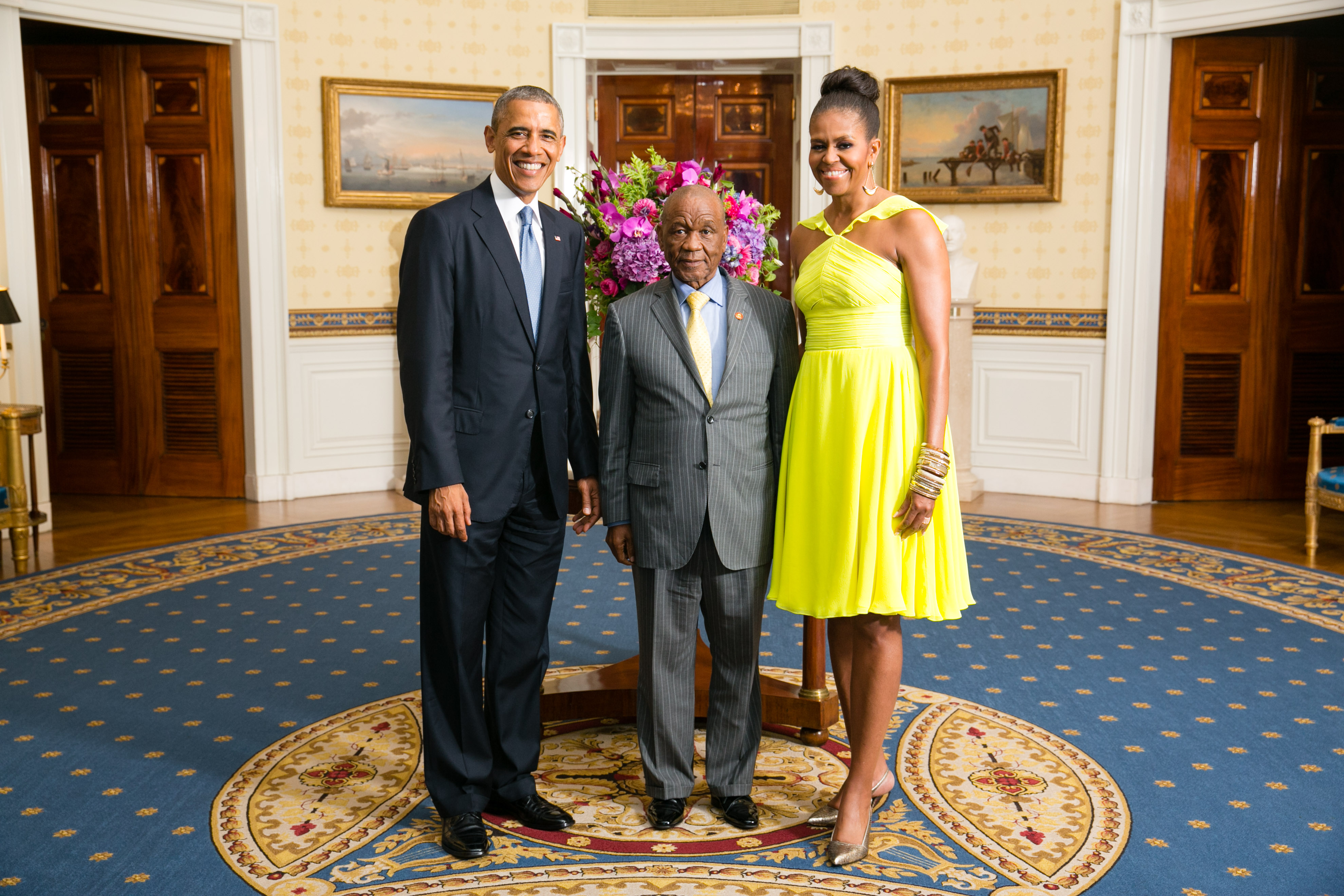

== Liberia ==
Table of trips
Dates	Guest	Title	Reason
May 26 – June 12, 1943	Edwin Barclay	President	Official visit. Addressed joint session of U.S. Congress on May 28. Afterwards visited Akron and Columbus, Buffalo, Philadelphia and New York City.
October 18–21, 1954	William Tubman (President-elect)	President	Accompanied President Edwin Barclay.
October 17–24, 1961	William Tubman (President-elect)	President	Official visit; visited New York City and Rutherford.
March 23 – April 3, 1968	William Tubman (President-elect)	President	Official visit.In U.S.March 23 – April 3; visited New York City, Baltimore, and Cedar Rapids.
June 5, 1973	William Tolbert	President	Private visit
November 5, 1974	William Tolbert	President	Private visit
September 20–27, 1976	William Tolbert	President	State visit. Addressed joint session of U.S. Congress on September 23. Also visited Williamsburg, Virginia and Atlanta. After September 27, private visit to Philadelphia and New York City.
September 25 – October 2, 1979	William Tolbert	President	Private visit; met with President Carter on October 2.
August 16–21, 1982	Samuel Doe	President	Official working visit. Private visit afterwards to Los Angeles.
February 9–12, 2004	Gyude Bryant	Chairman	Working visit
March 15–23, 2006	Ellen Johnson-Sirleaf	President	Addressed joint session of U.S. Congress on March 15.
February 12–16, 2007	Ellen Johnson-Sirleaf	President	Working visit
October 17–28, 2007	Ellen Johnson-Sirleaf	President	Working visit
October 20–22, 2008	Ellen Johnson-Sirleaf	President	Working visit. Also addressed the White House summit on international development on October 21.
May 27, 2010	Ellen Johnson-Sirleaf	President	Working visit
February 25–27, 2015	Ellen Johnson-Sirleaf	President	Official visit; met with President Obama and Secretary of State John Kerry to discuss progress in addressing the West African Ebola virus epidemic.
April 15, 2015	Ellen Johnson-Sirleaf	President	Attended the Africa Leaders Ebola Meeting.

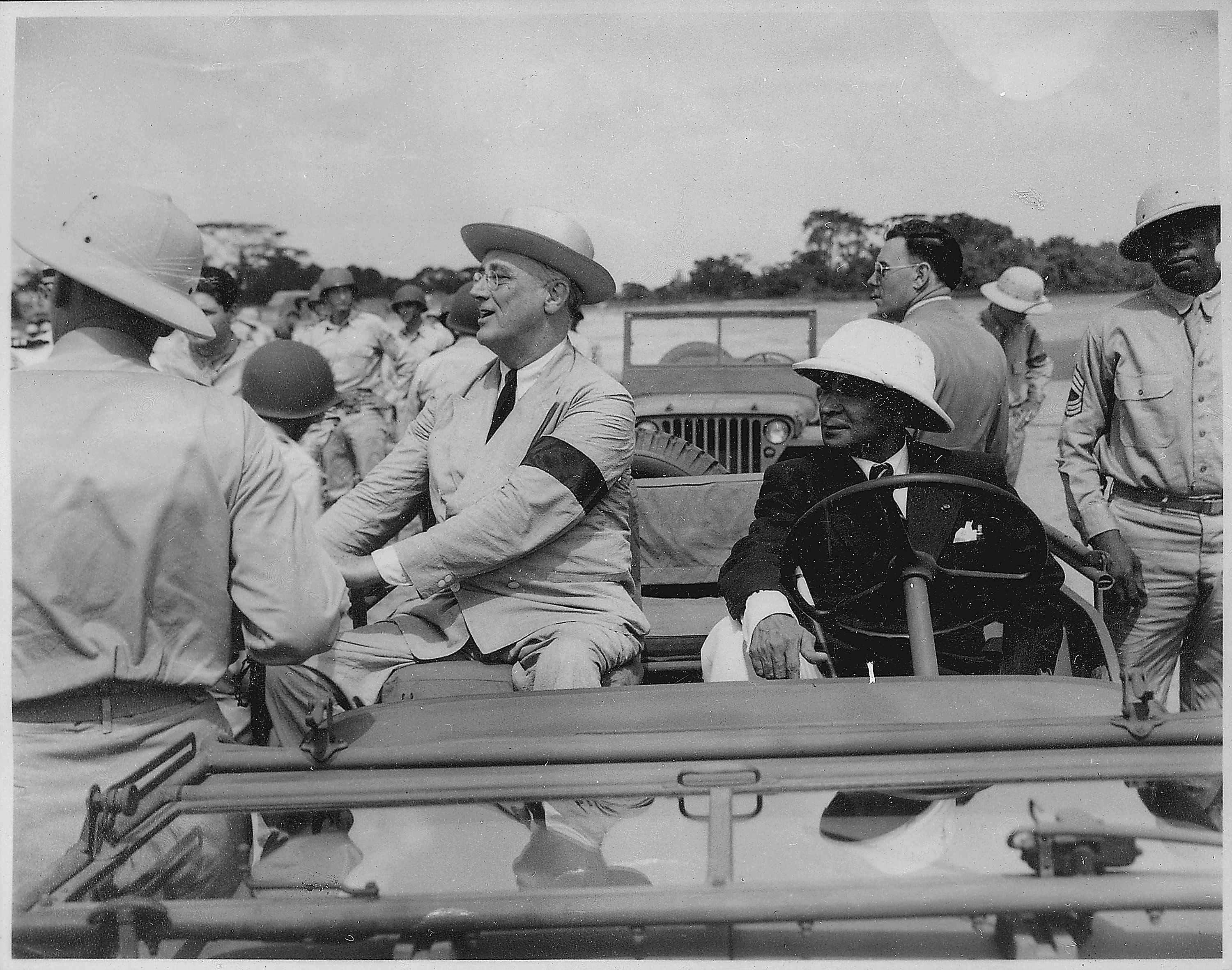

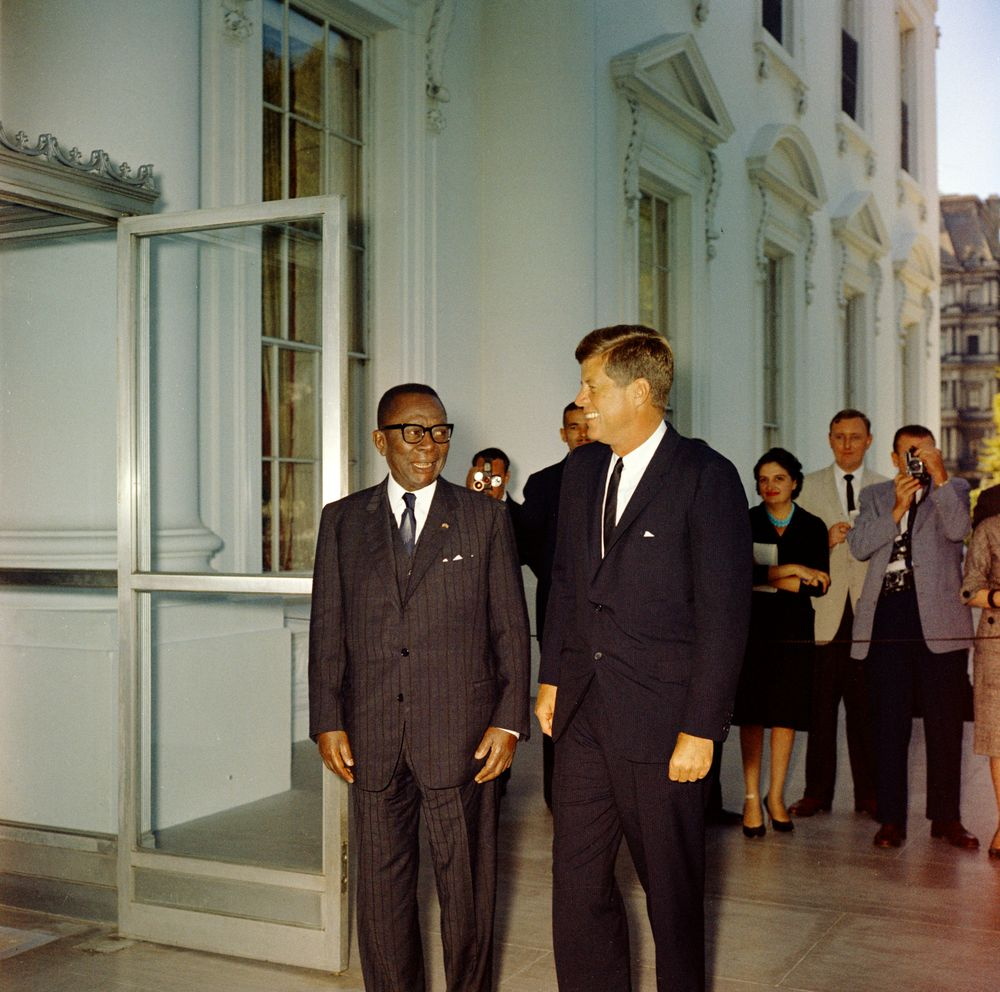

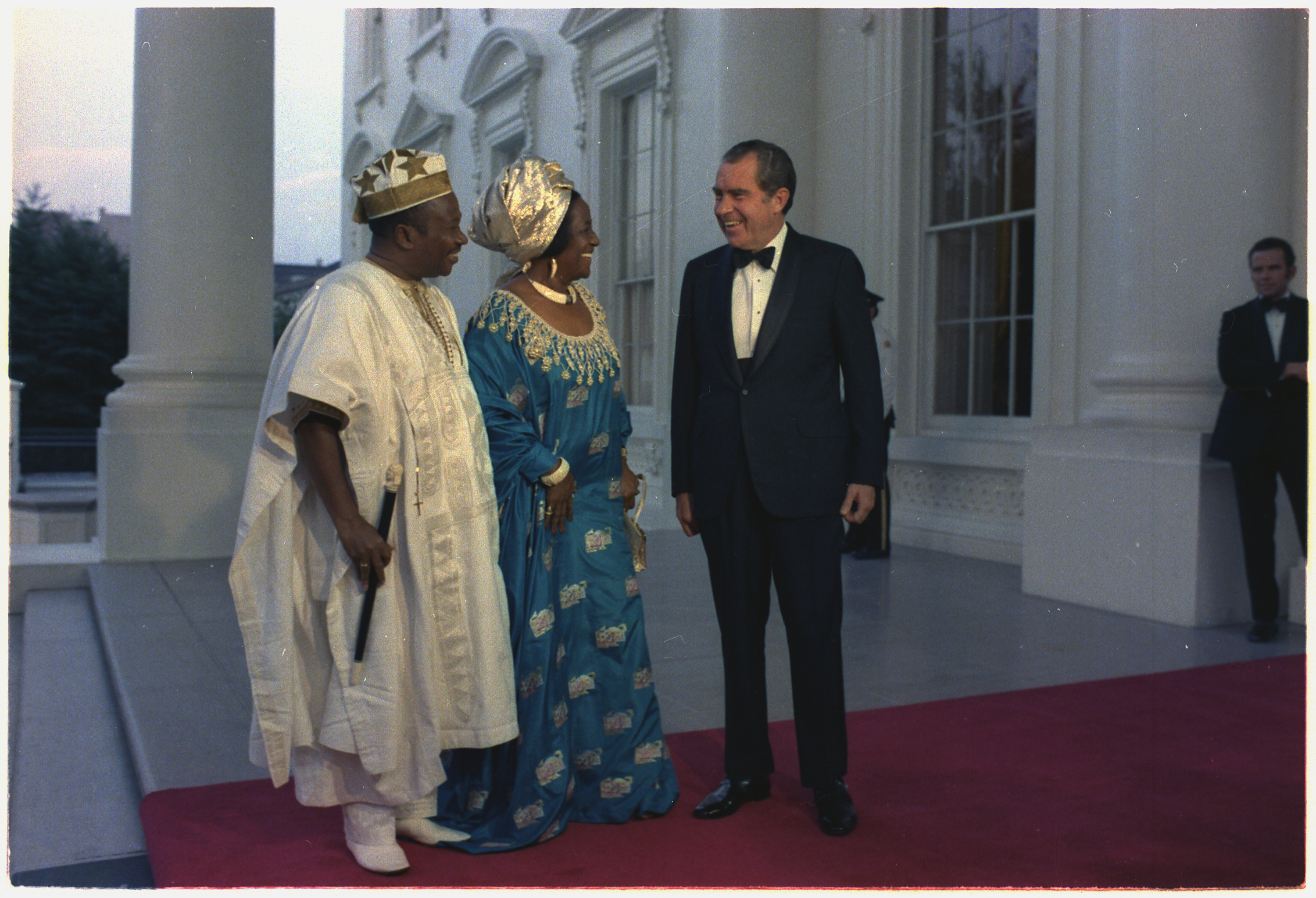

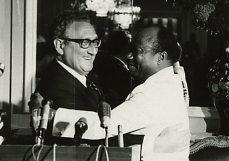

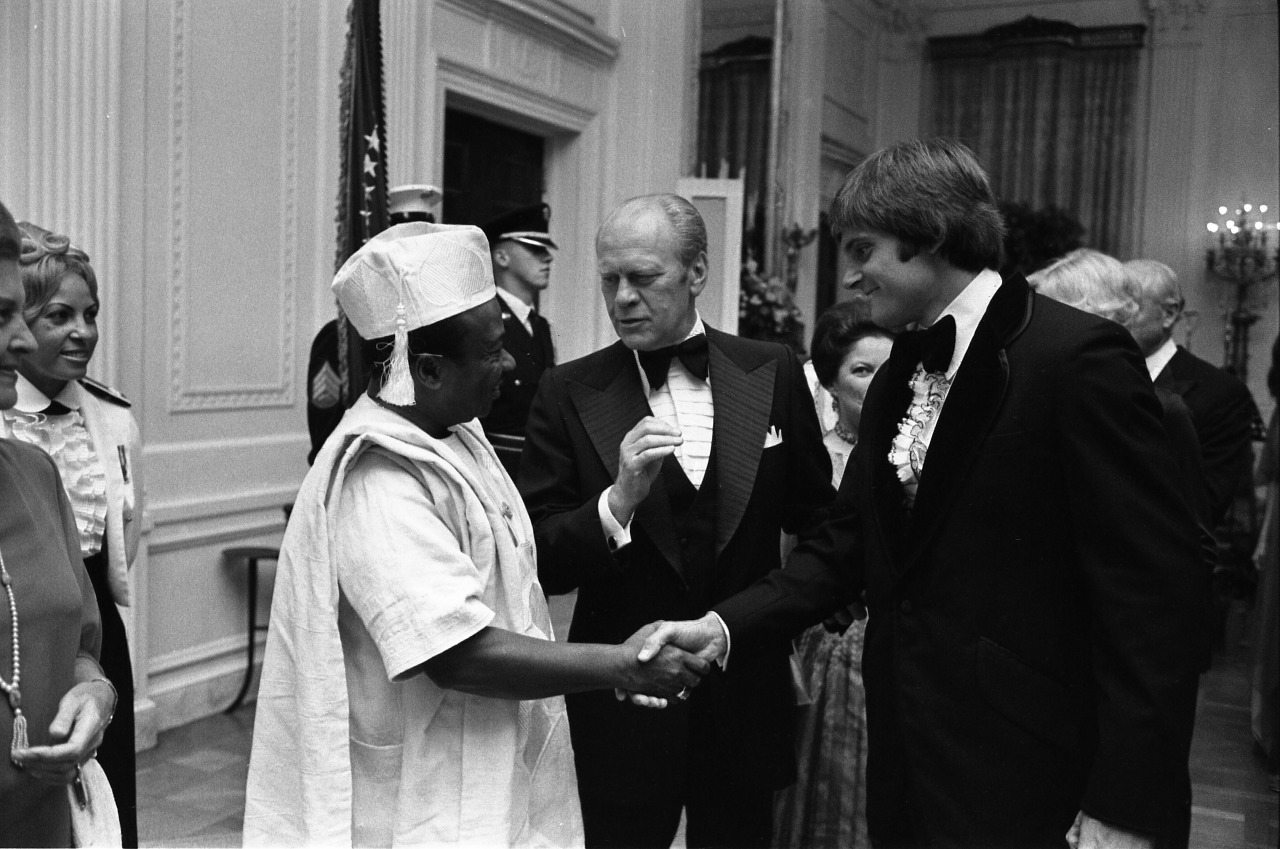

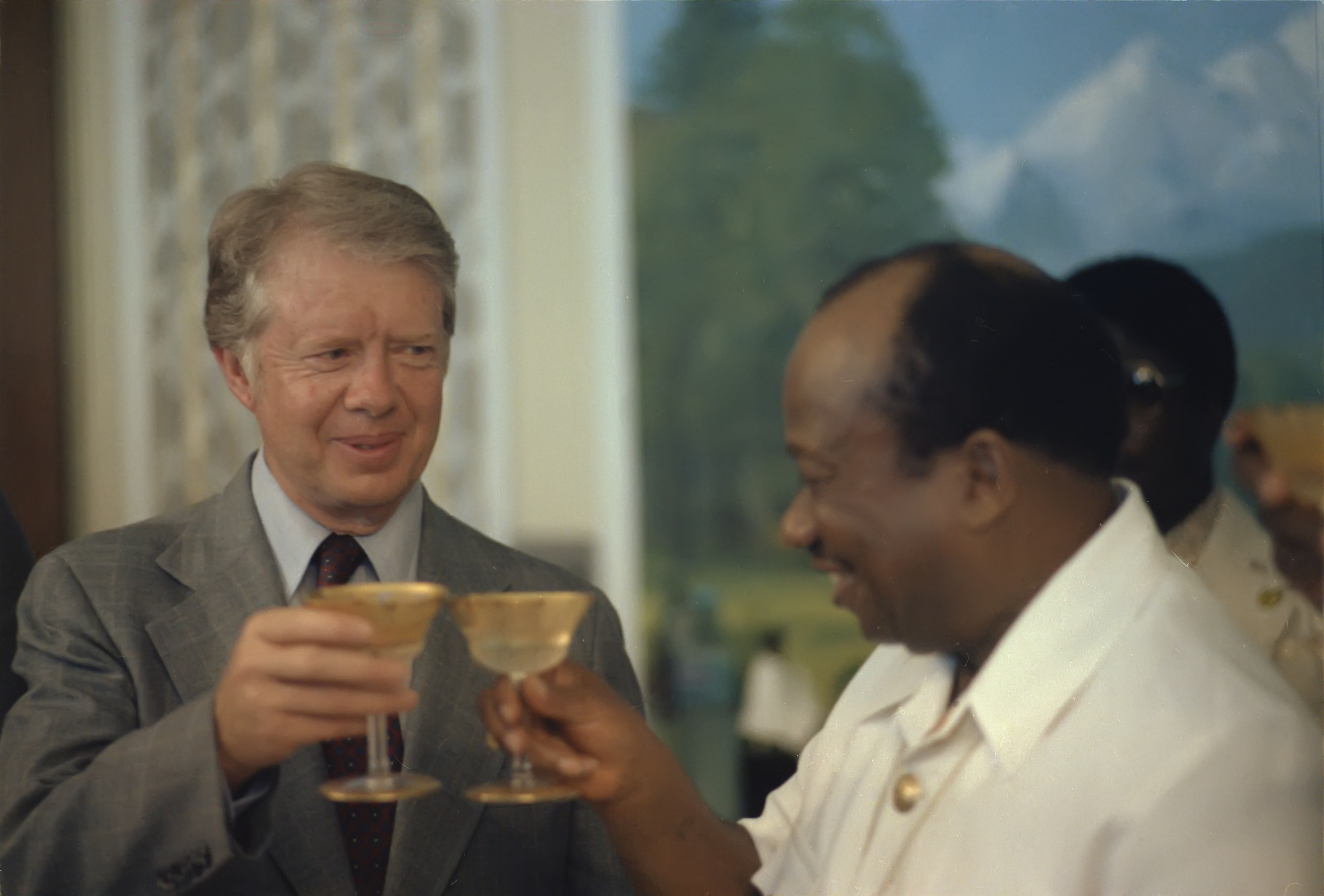

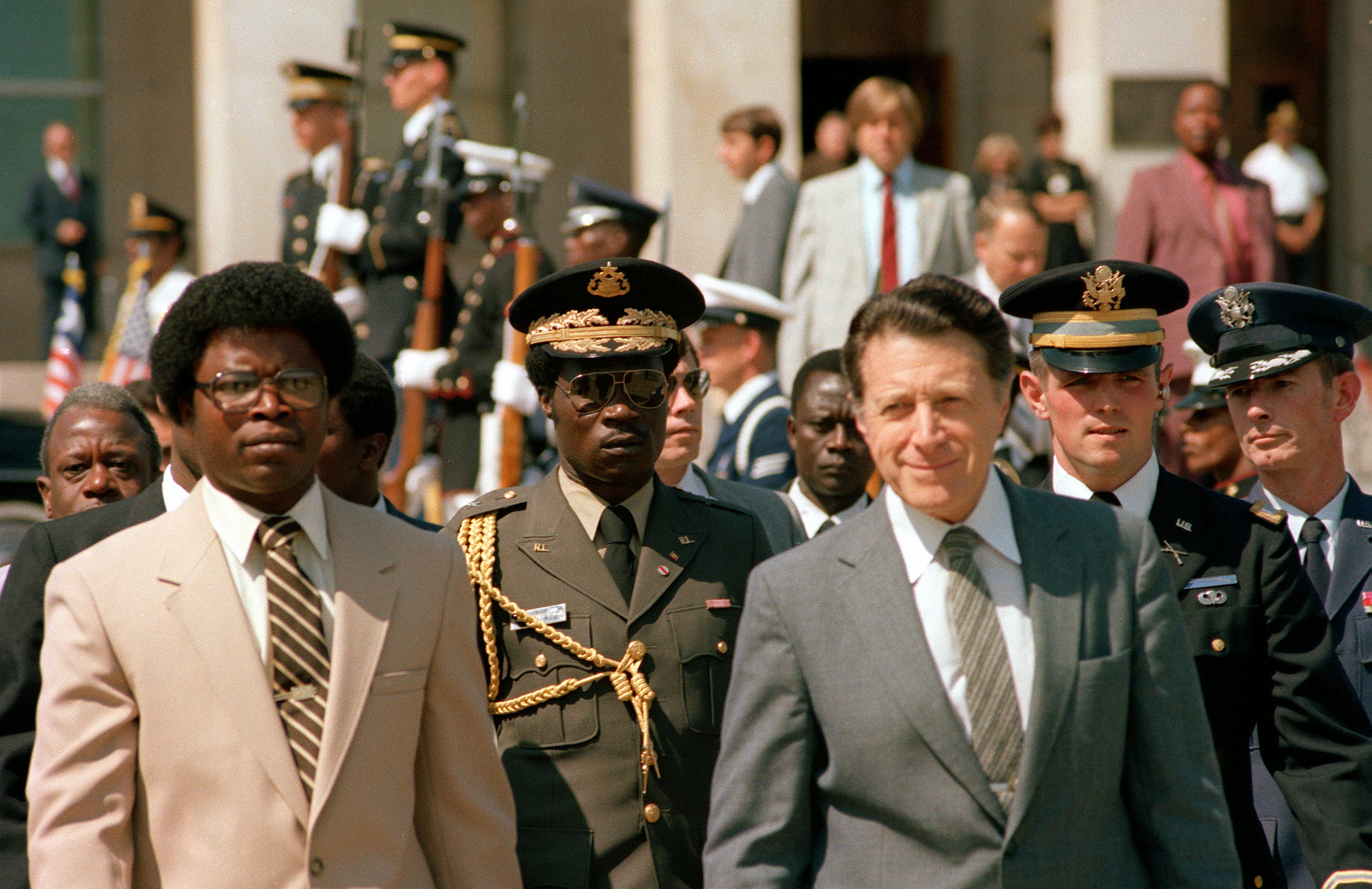

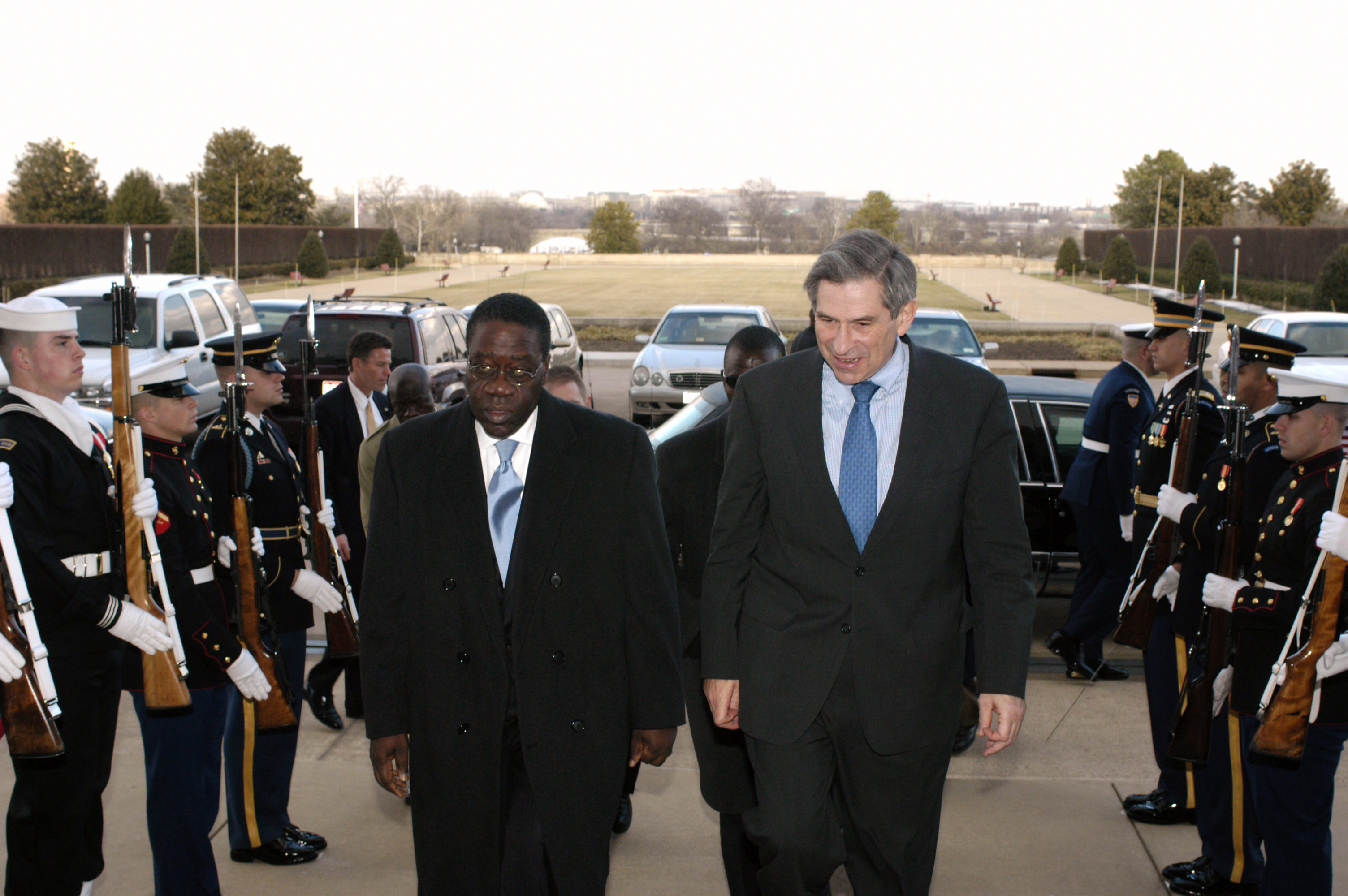

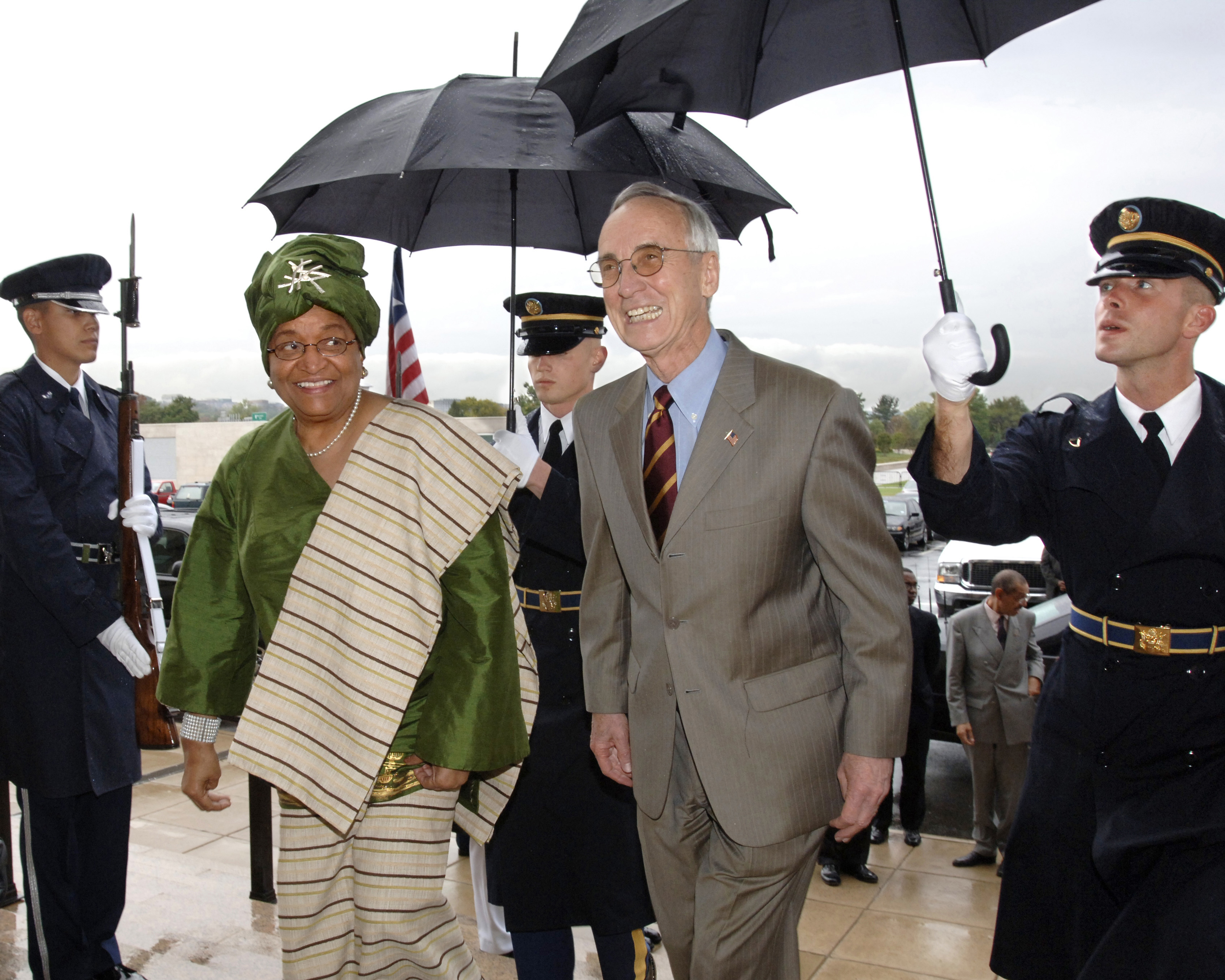

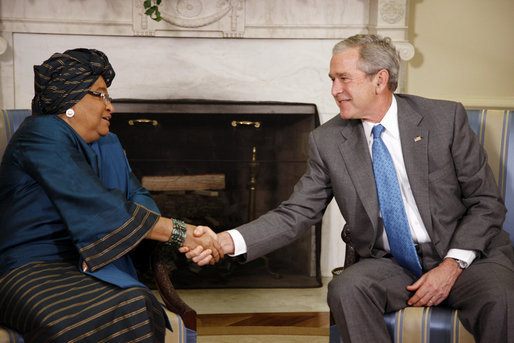

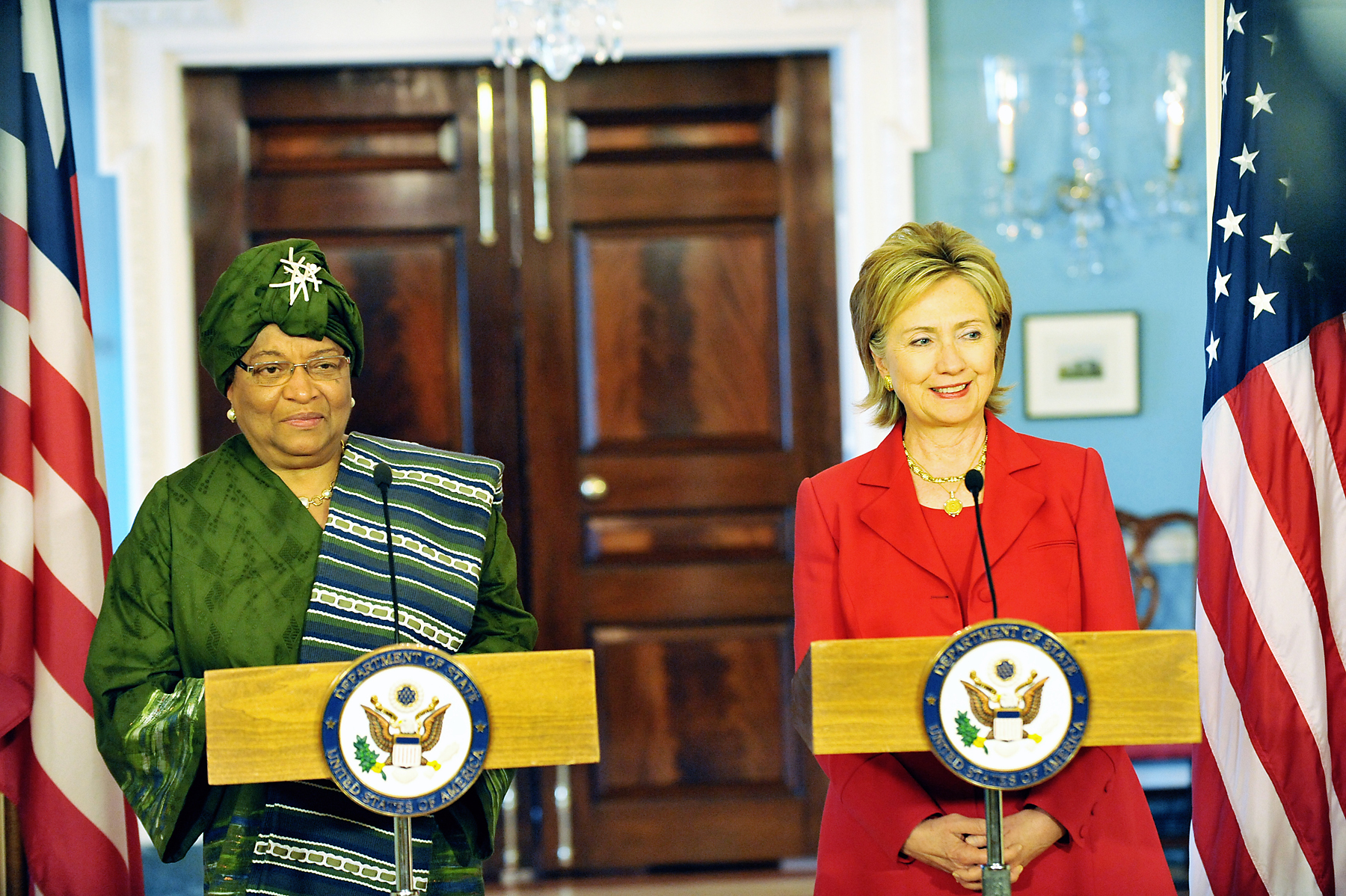

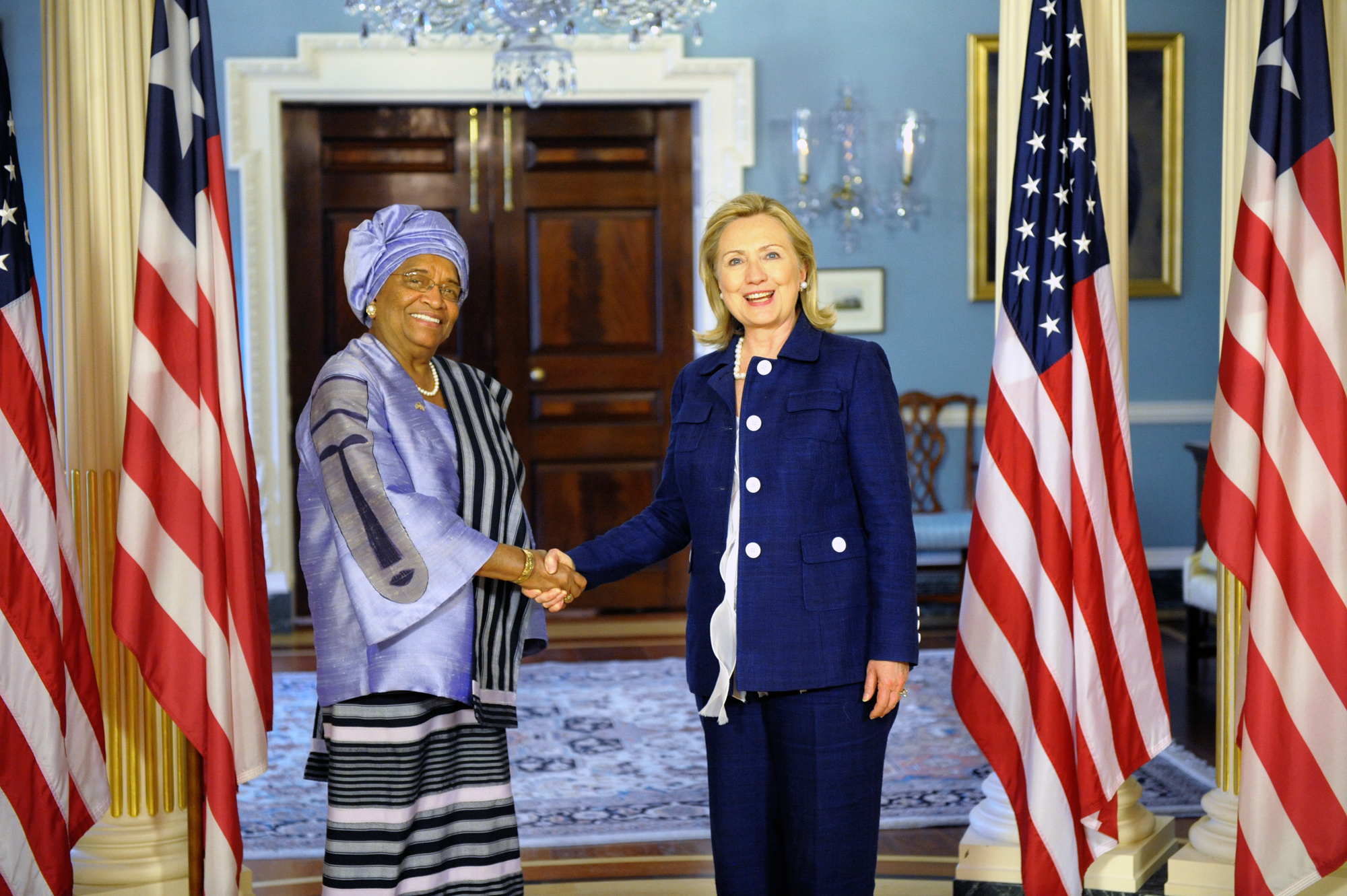

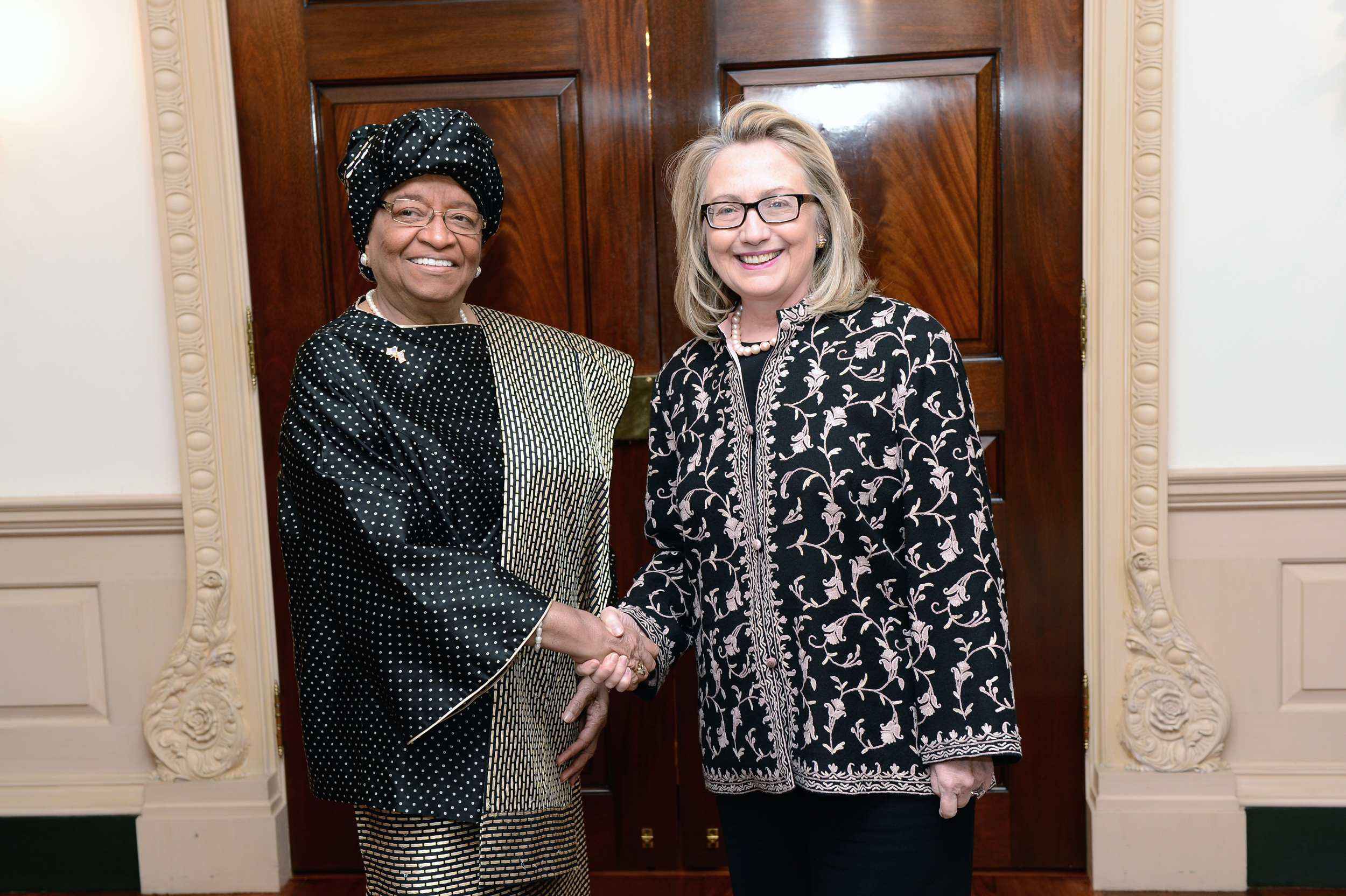

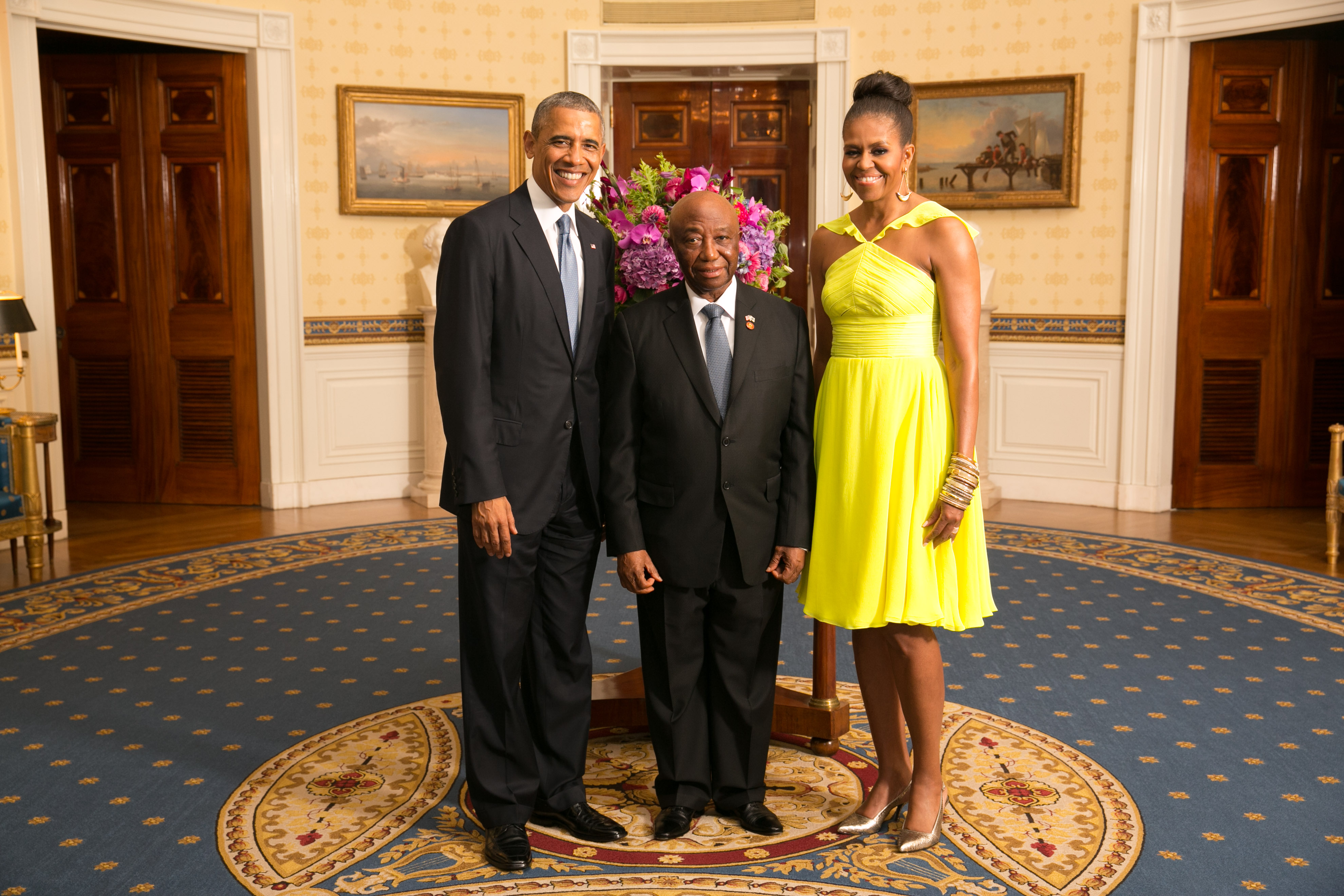

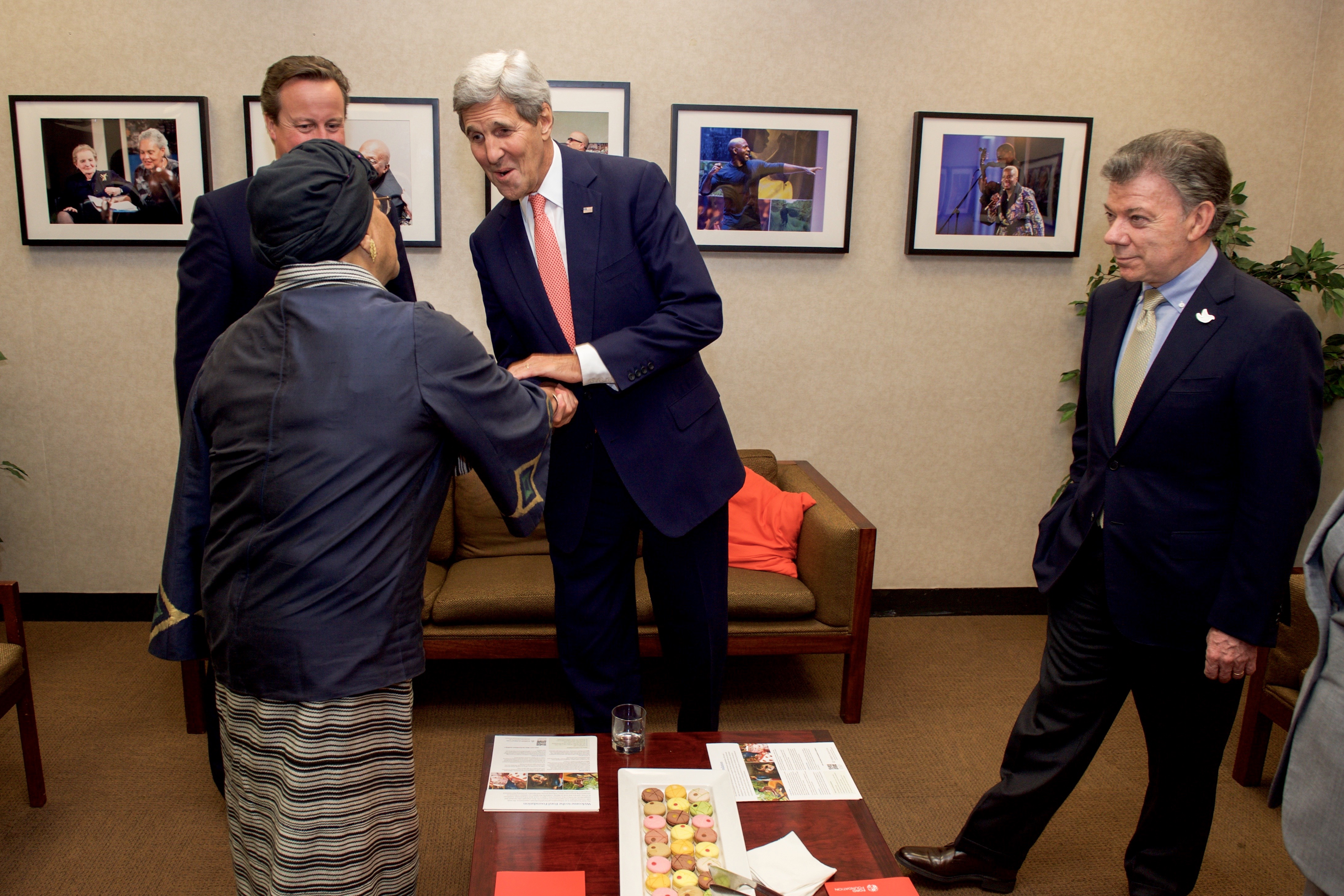

== Libya ==
Table of trips
Dates	Guest	Title	Reason
July 13–17, 1954	Mustafa Ben Halim	Prime Minister	Unofficial visit. Discussed U.S. military base rights and economic assistance.
March 7, 2012	Abdurrahim El-Keib	Prime Minister	Working visit.
August 4–6, 2014	Abdullah al-Thani	Prime Minister	Attended the United States–Africa Leaders Summit.
December 1, 2017	Fayez al-Sarraj	Prime Minister	Working visit. Met with President Trump.

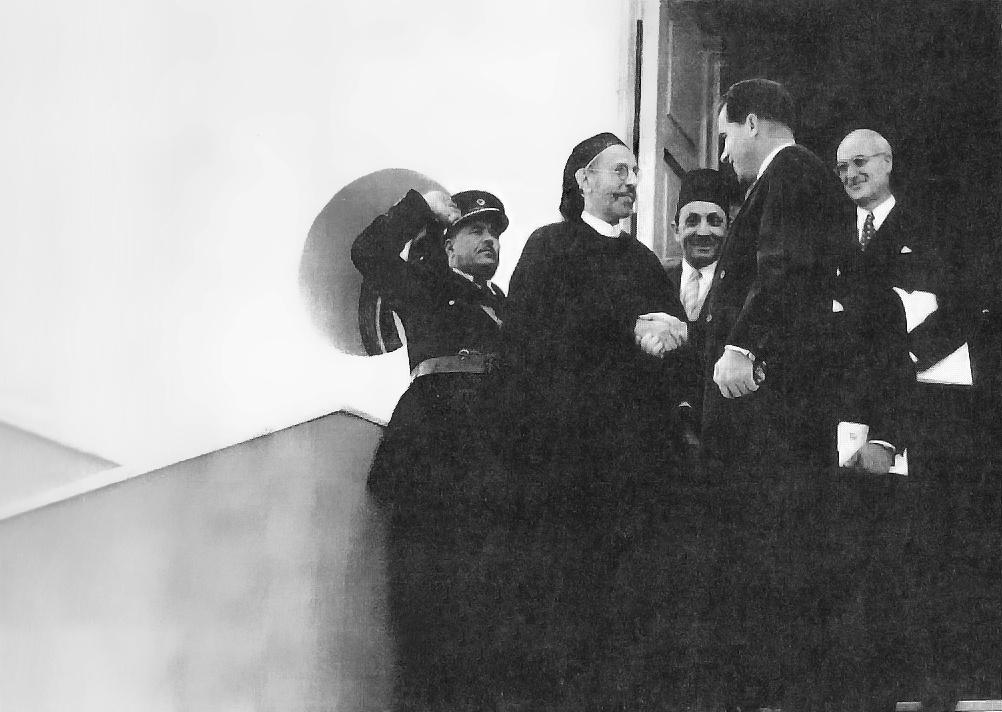

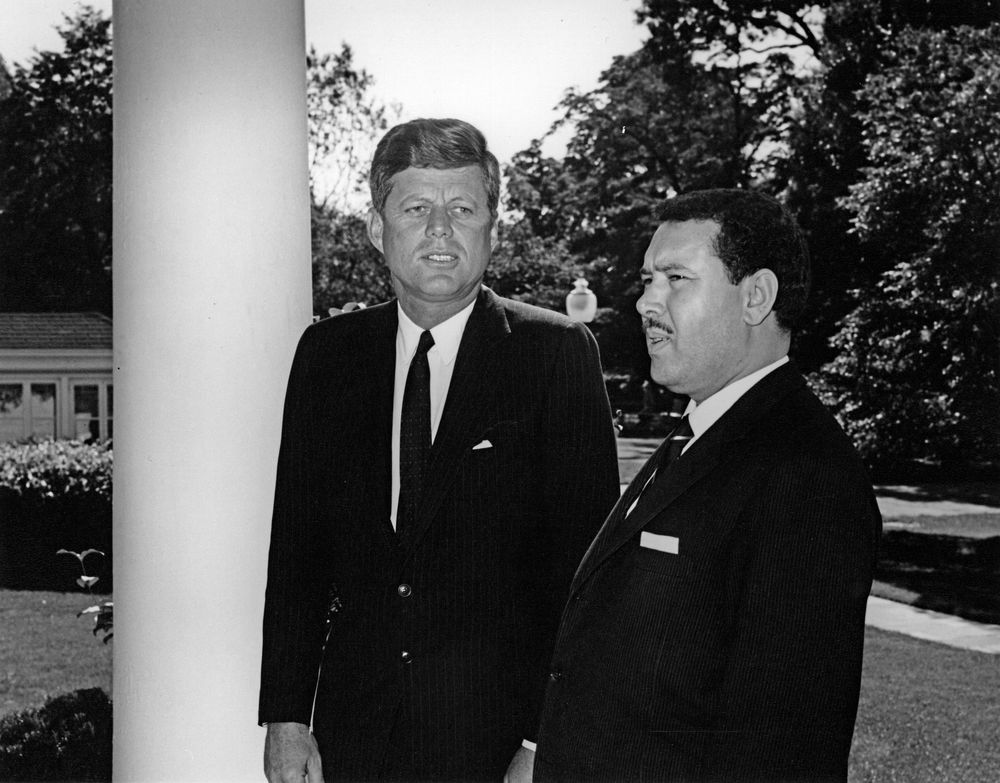

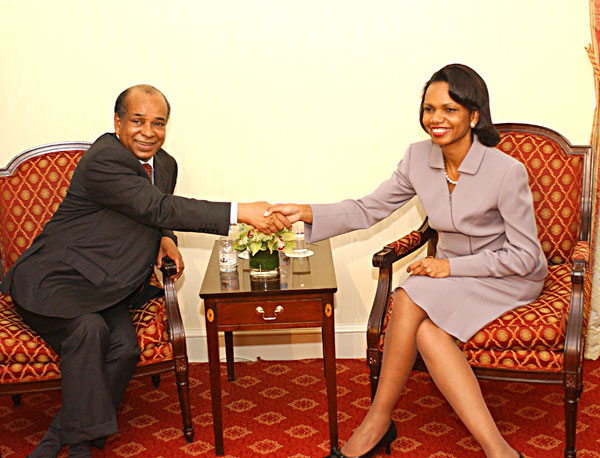

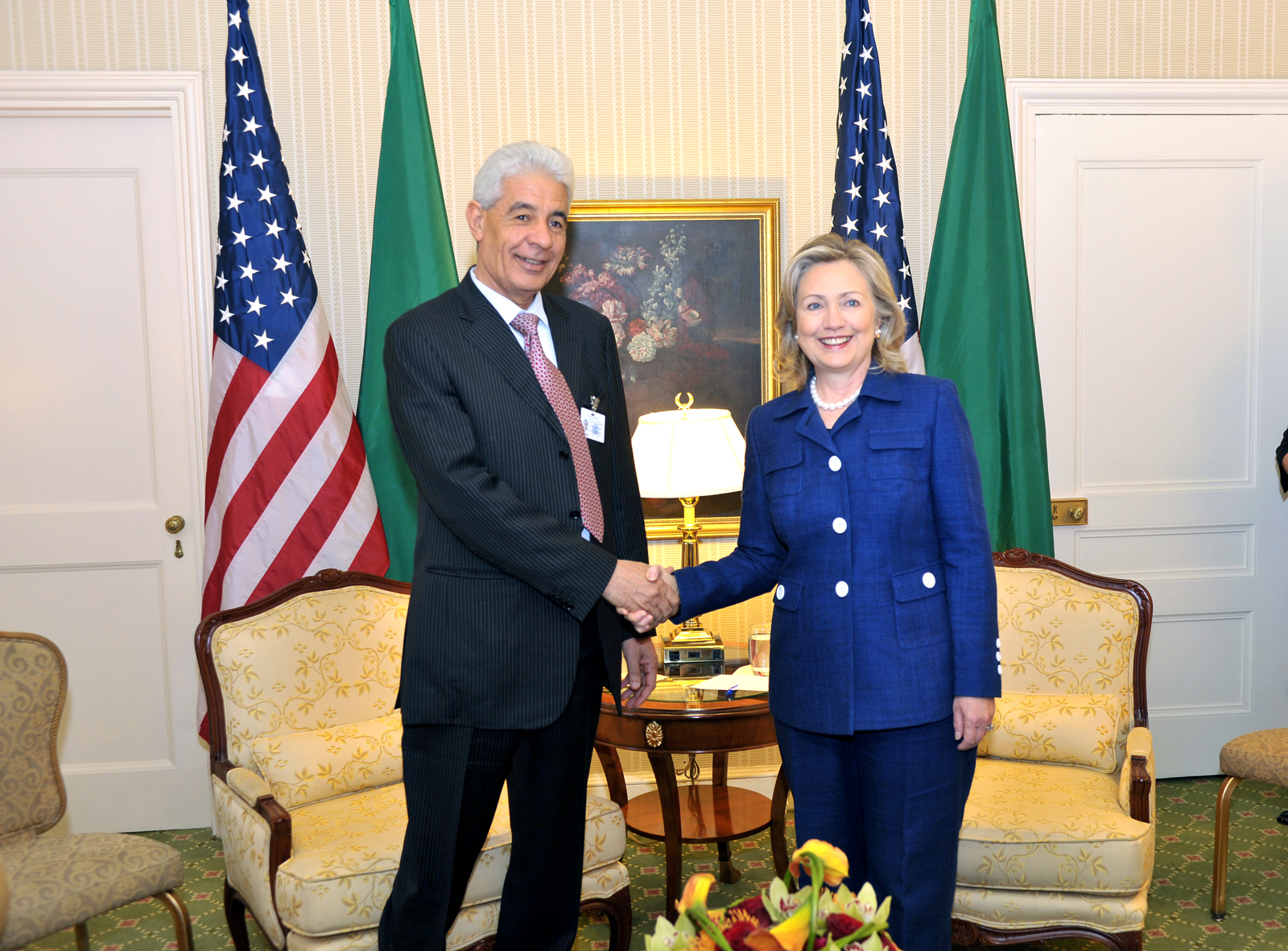

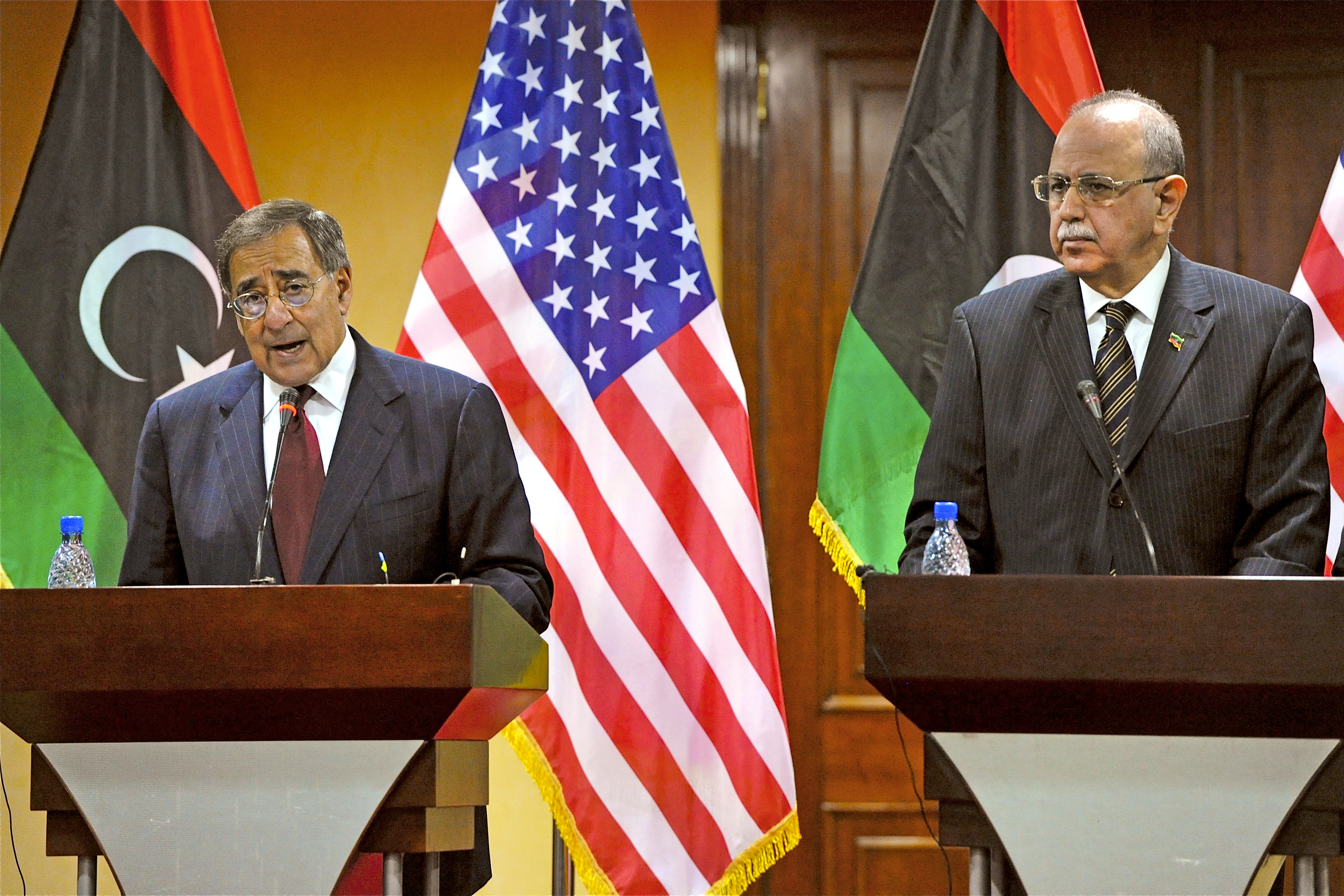

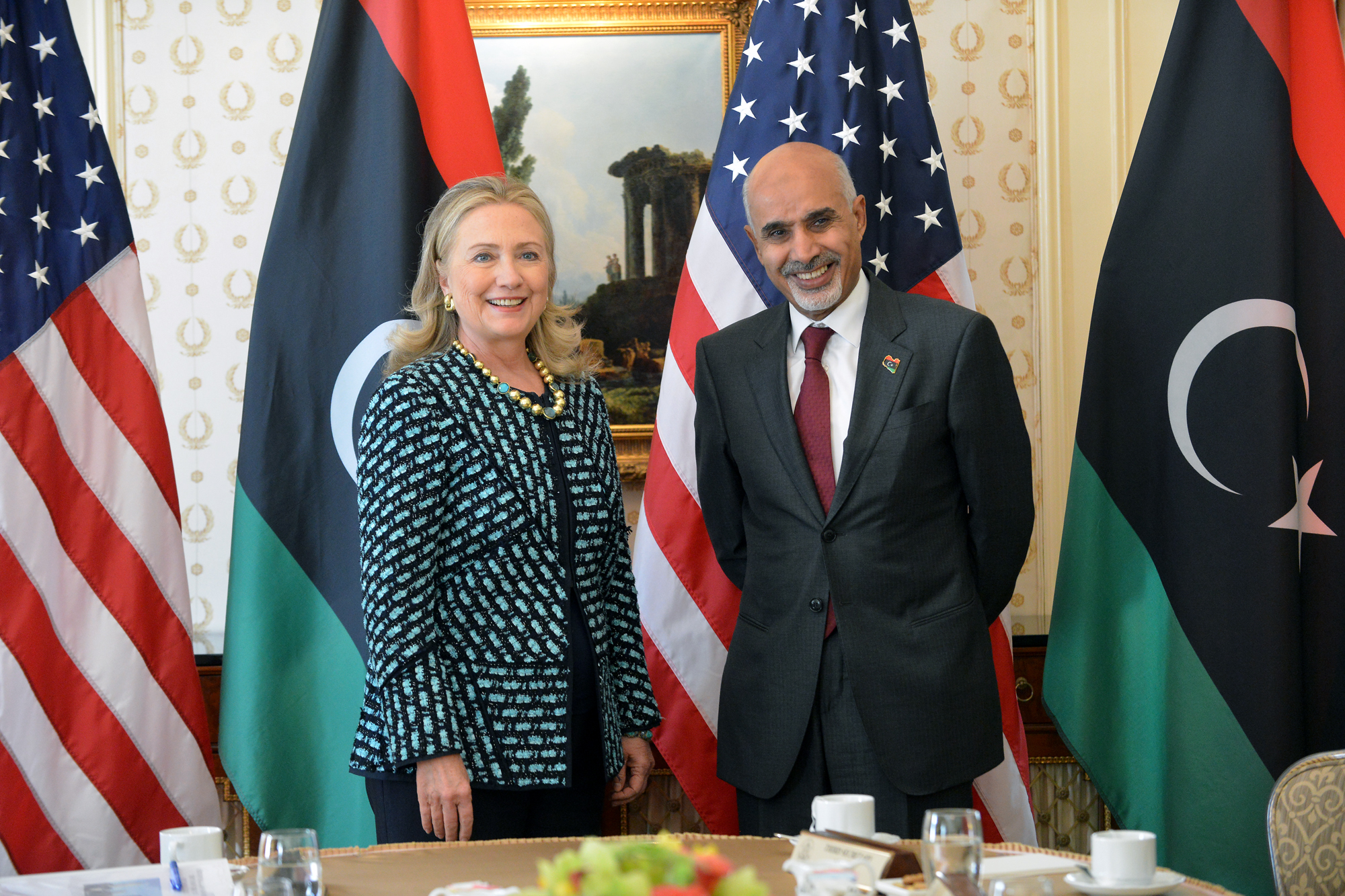

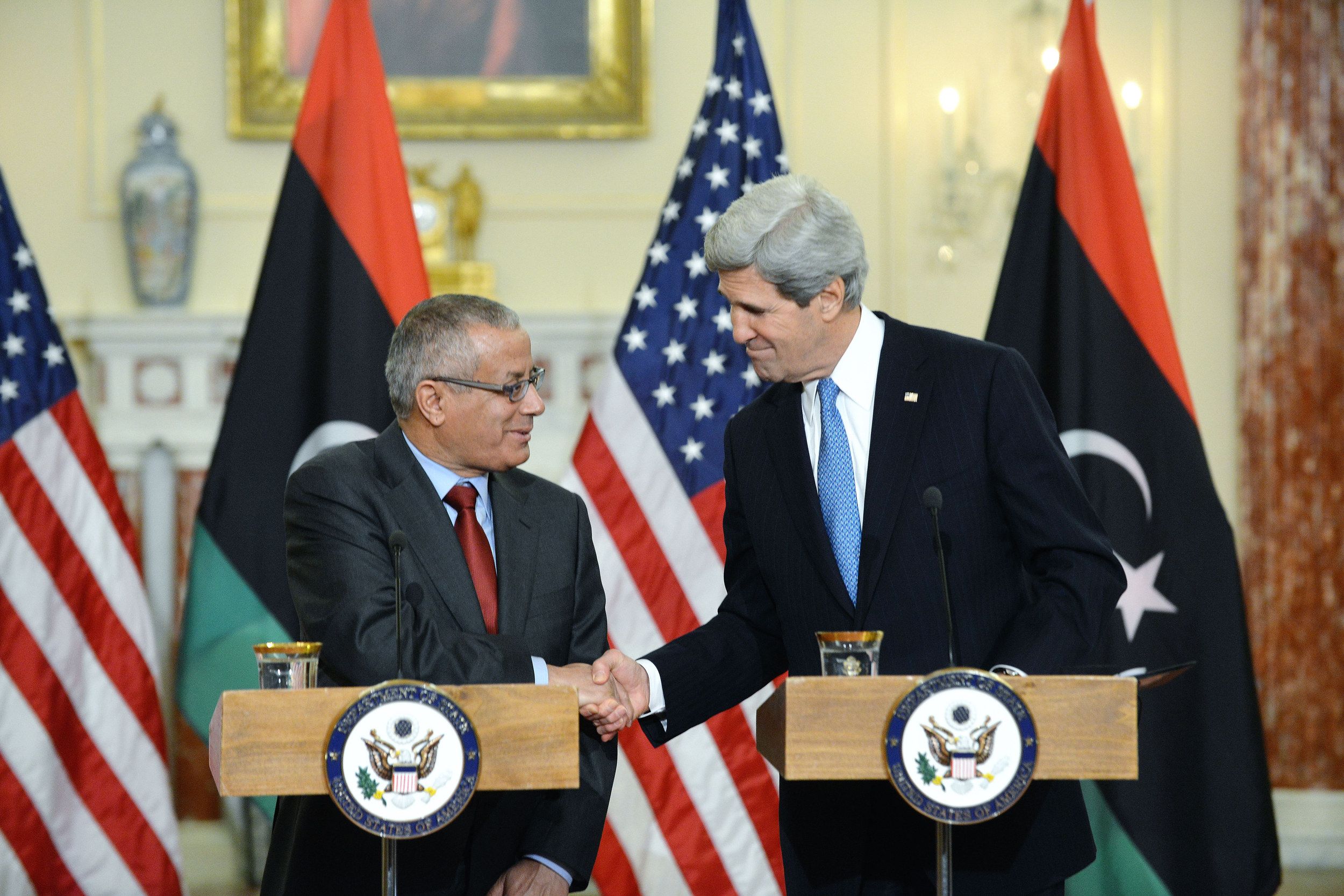

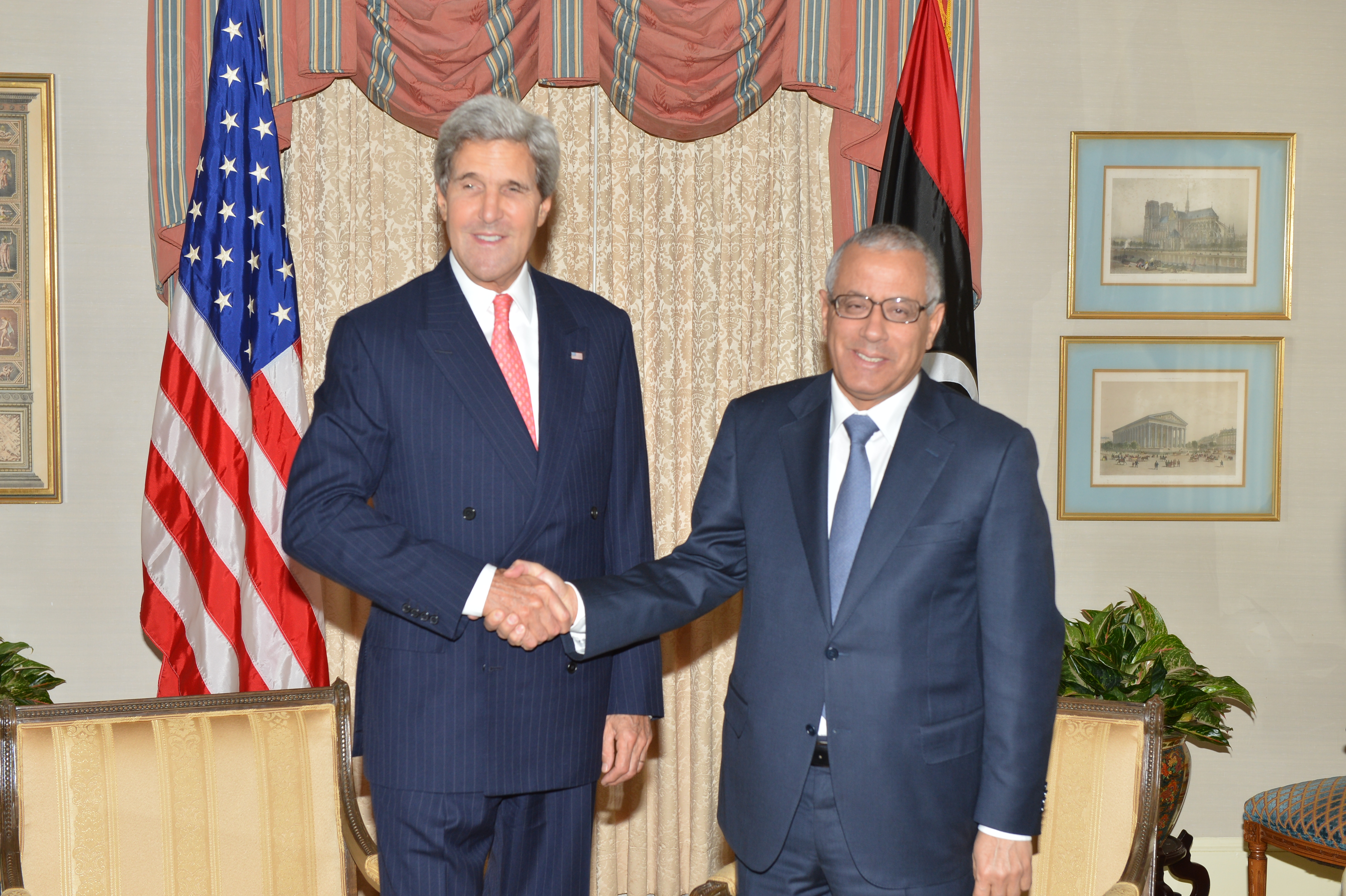

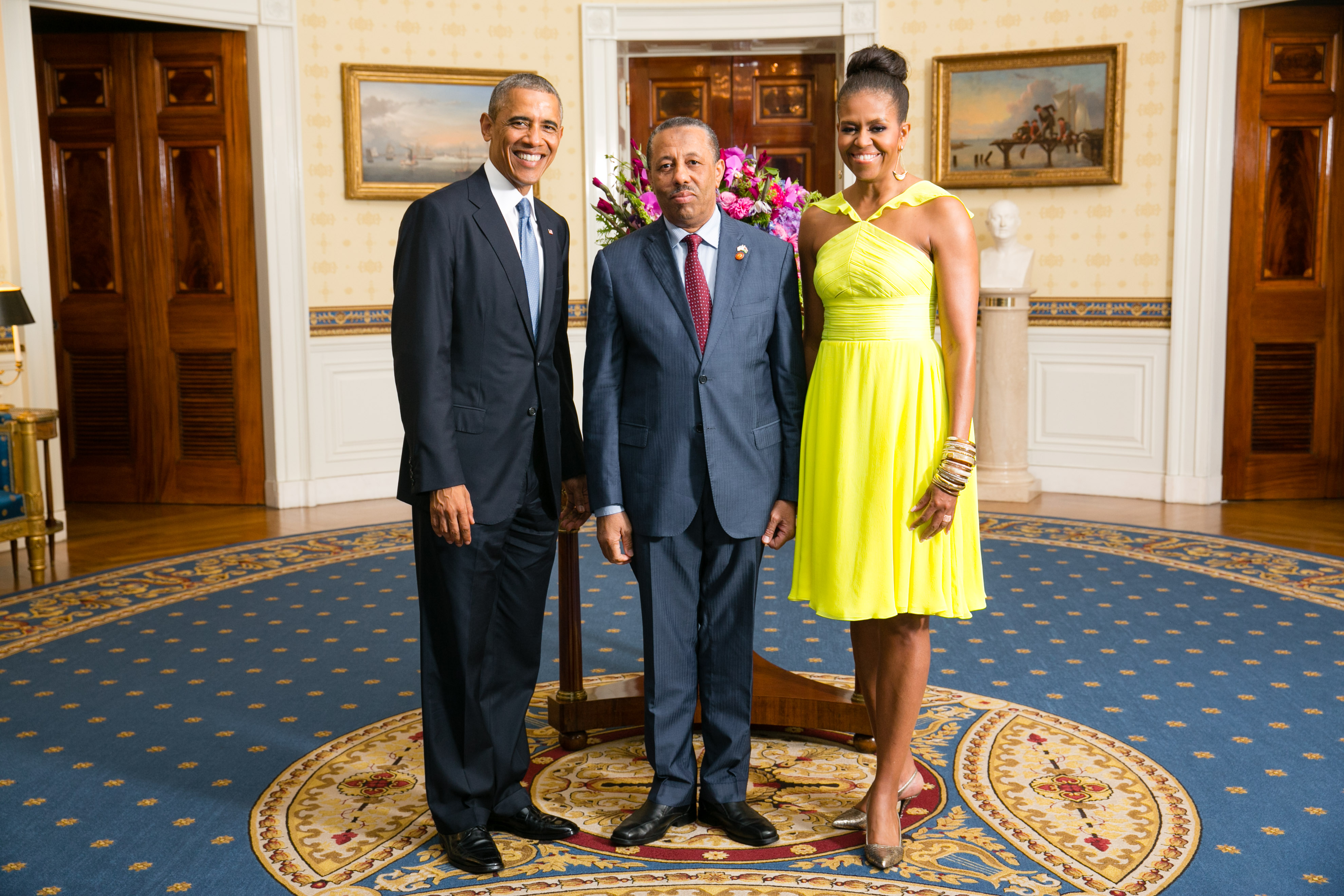

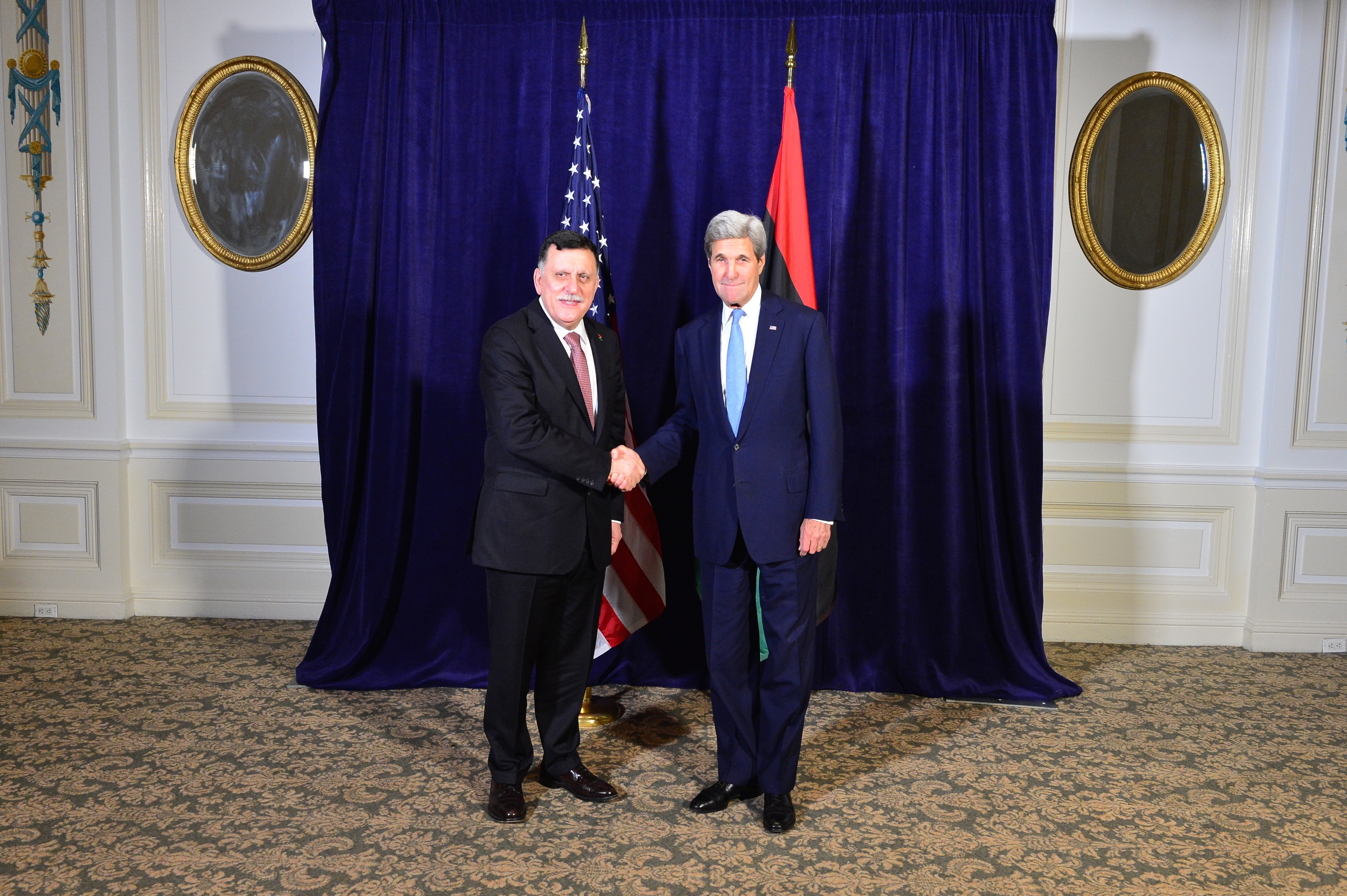

== Madagascar ==
Table of trips
Dates	Guest	Title	Reason
July 27-August 5, 1964	Philibert Tsiranana	President	Official visit. In U.S. July 26–August 5, visited Philadelphia, New York City, Minneapolis (Minnesota), San Francisco, and Honolulu (Hawaii).
August 5–6, 2014	Hery Rajaonarimampianina	President	Attended the U.S.-Africa Leaders Summit.

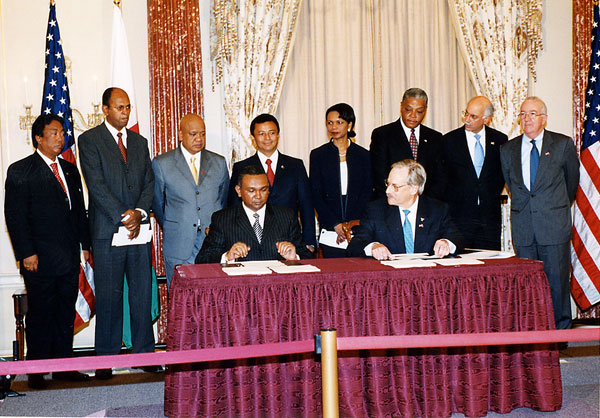

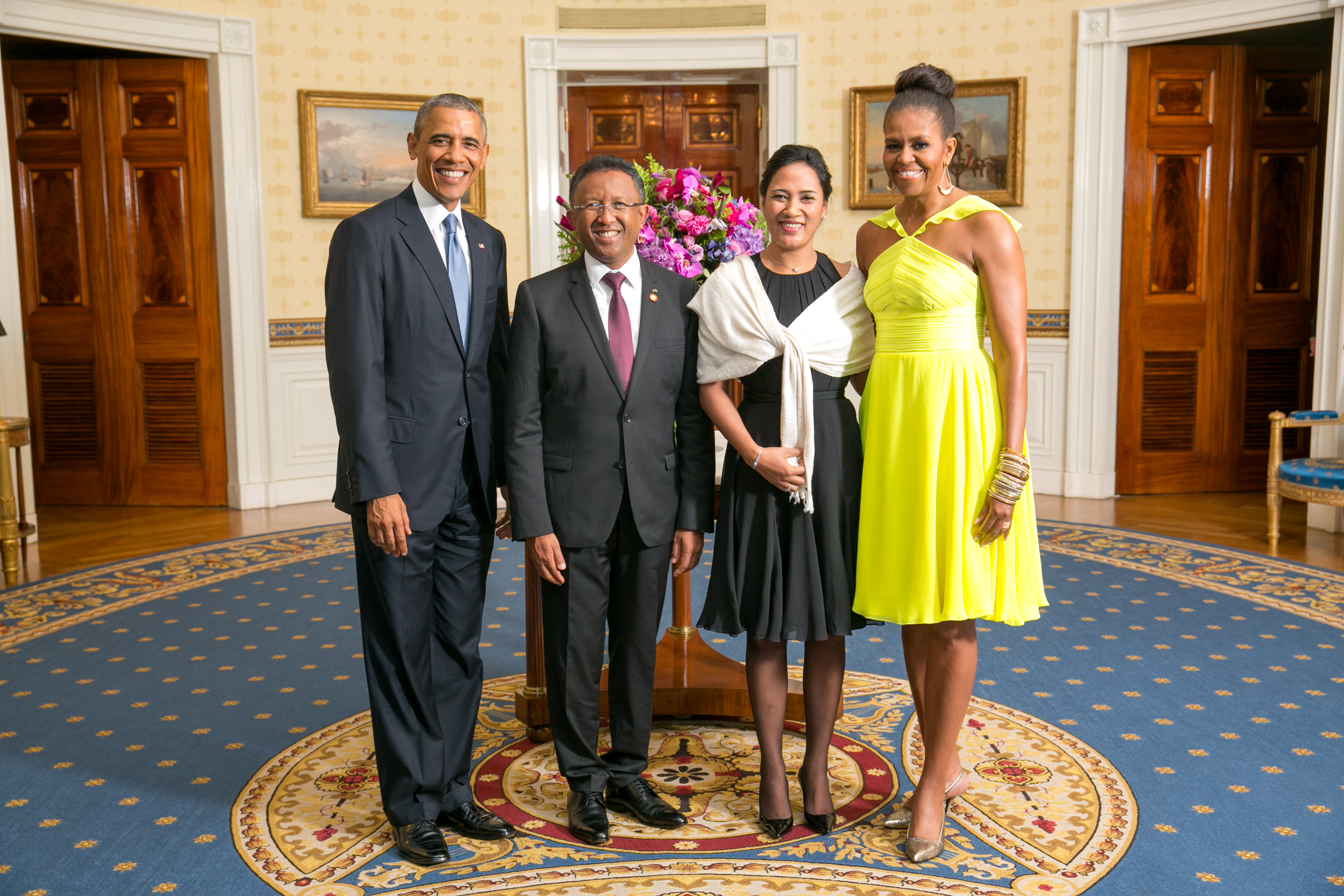

== Malawi ==
Table of trips
Dates	Guest	Title	Reason
June 2–11, 1967	Hastings Banda	President	Private visit; visited Amherst, Massachusetts and Kansas City, Missouri.
October 19, 1995	Bakili Muluzi	President	Attended Africare dinner with President Clinton.
September 23, 2010	Bingu Wa Mutharika	President	Attended the United Nations General Assembly.
March 28, 2013	Joyce Banda	President	Attended the African Leaders Summit.
August 4–6, 2014	Peter Mutharika	President	Attended the United States–Africa Leaders Summit.

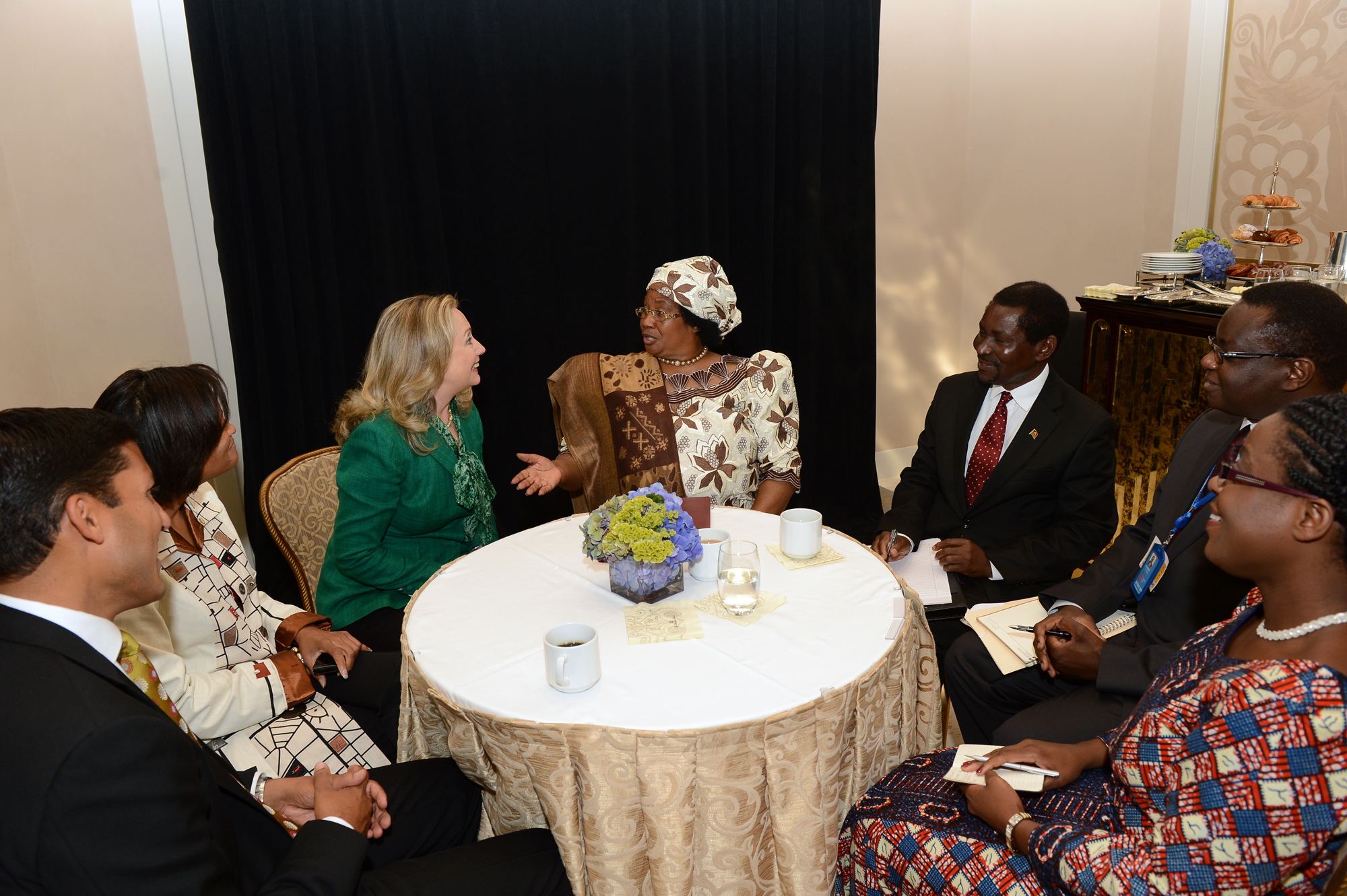

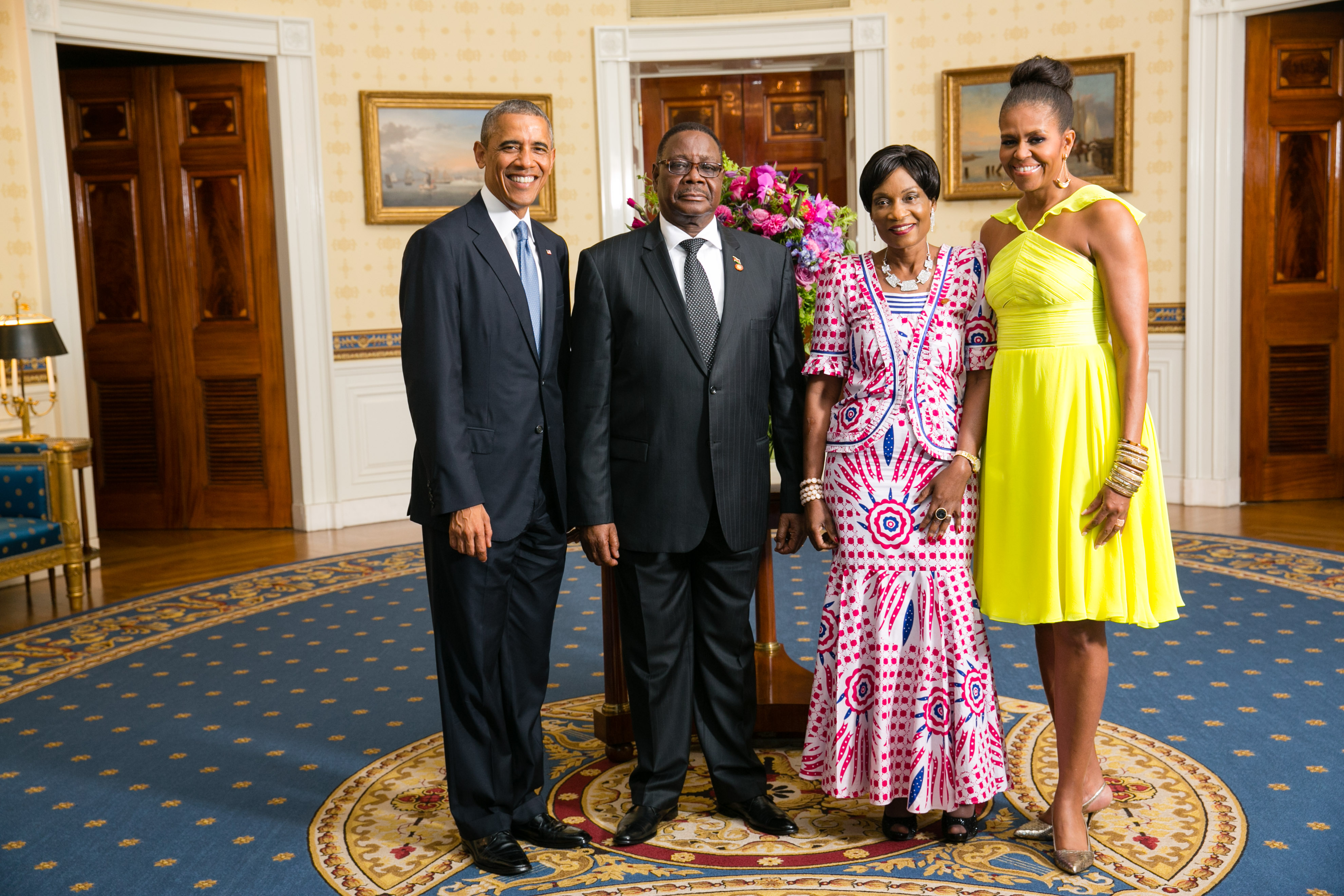

== Mali ==
Table of Trips
Start	End	Guest	Title	Reason
September 12, 1961	September 13, 1961	Modibo Keïta	President	Informal visit after attendingConference of Nonaligned Nations in Belgrade.
October 5, 1988	October 9, 1988	Moussa Traore	President	State Visit; (October 9) visited Dayton, Wilberforce, and Columbus
November 18, 1997	November 21, 1997	Alpha Oumar Konare	President	Working visit.
June 26, 2001	June 28, 2001	Alpha Oumar Konare	President	Working visit; attended a forum of the Partnership to Cut Hunger in Africa.
February 11, 2008	February 13, 2008	Amadou Toumani Toure	President	Working visit.

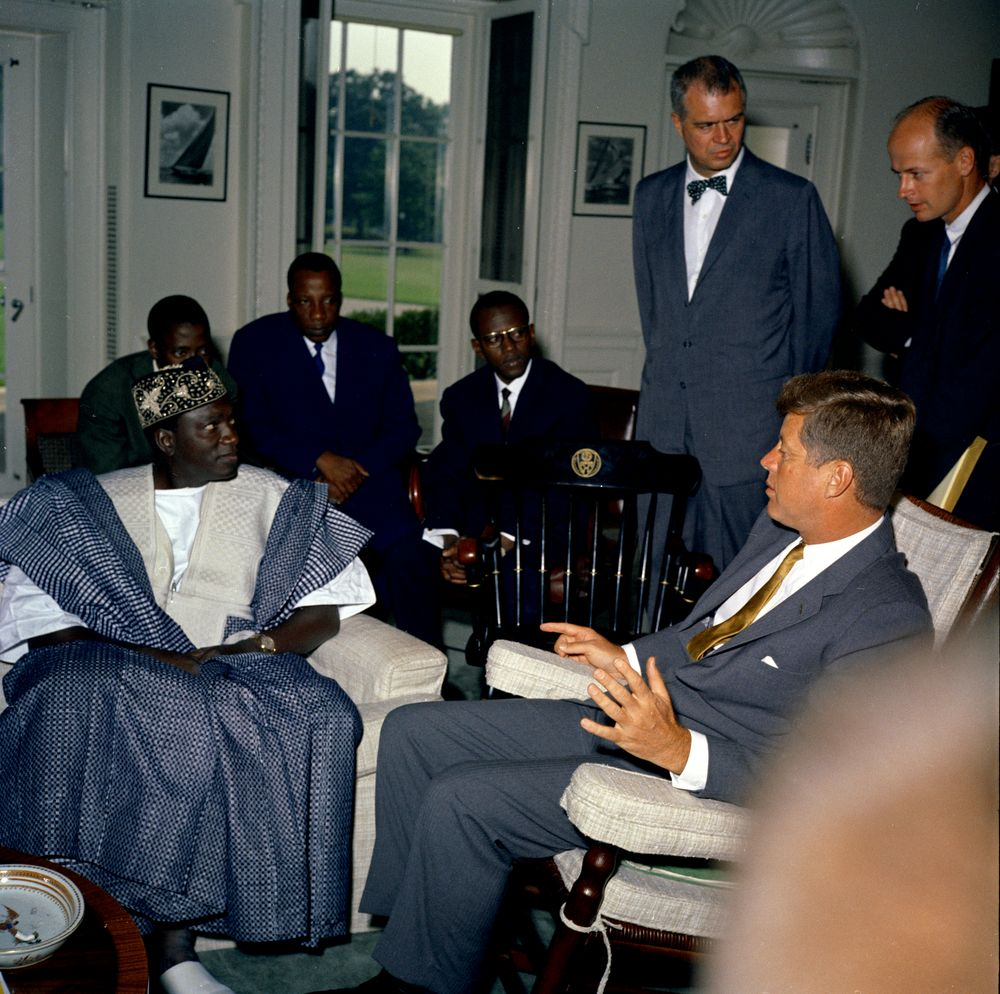

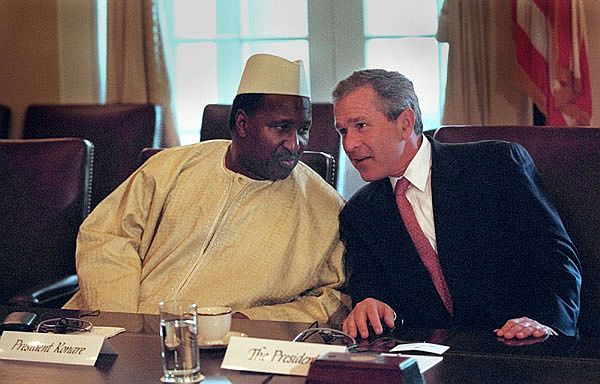

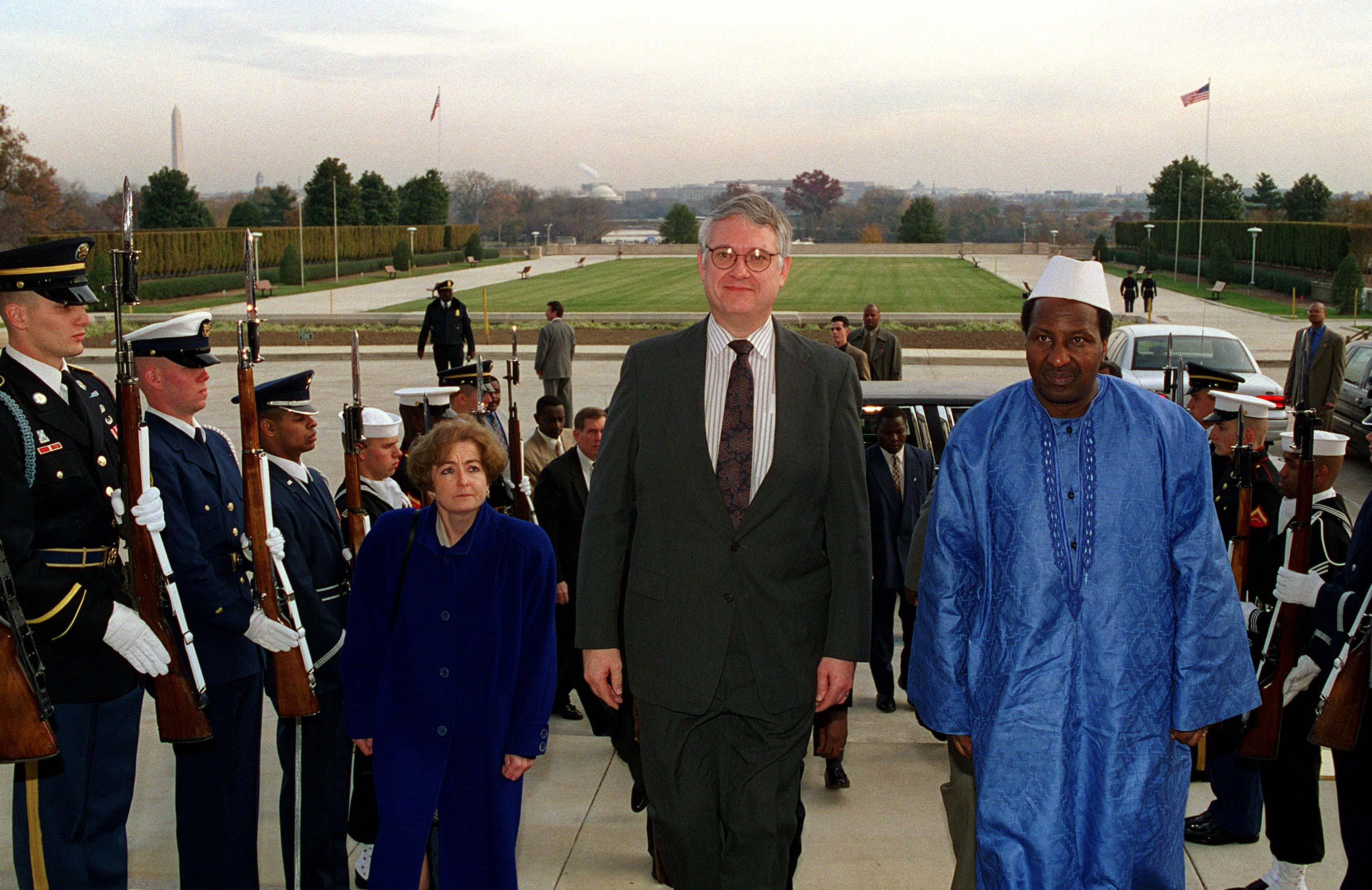

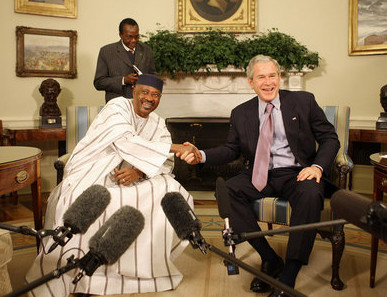

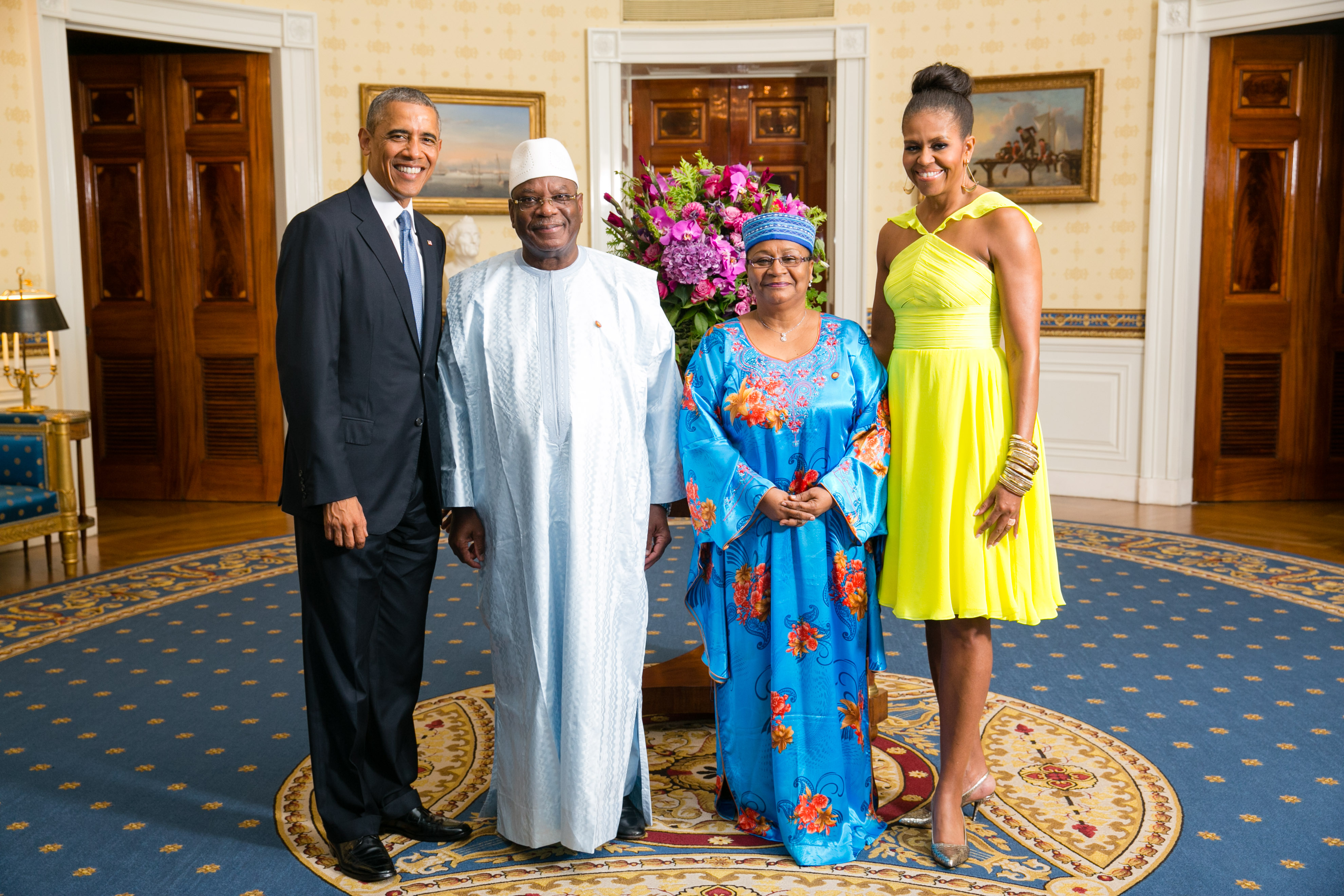

== Morocco ==
Table of Trips
Start	End	Guest	Title	Reason
November 25, 1957	November 28, 1957	Mohammed V	King	State visit.Afterwards visited Williamsburg, Dallas, Los Angeles, San Francisco, Omaha, Niagara Falls, and New York City.Departed U.S.December 13.
October 15, 1959	October 15, 1959	Abdallah Ibrahim	Prime Minister	Informal meeting with President Eisenhower. In U.S.October 11–30, led Moroccan delegation to the UN General Assembly, and visited Knoxville, Dallas, Phoenix, Los Angeles, Detroit and Niagara Falls
March 27, 1963	March 29, 1963	Hassan II	King	State visit. In U.S.March 26 – April 5. Visited New York City
February 9, 1967	February 11, 1967	Hassan II	King	Informal visit. Afterwards made a private visit to New York City.In U.S.February 8–17.
June 4, 1970	June 4, 1970	Ahmed Laraki	Prime Minister	Private visit. Presented personal message to President Nixon from King Hassan II
October 24, 1970	October 24, 1970	Ahmed Laraki	Prime Minister	Attended White House dinner on 25th Anniversary of the U.N.
April 15, 1971	April 15, 1971	Ahmed Laraki	Prime Minister	Private visit.
December 3, 1977	December 3, 1977	Ahmed Laraki	Prime Minister	Private visit. Delivered a message to President Carter postponing a state visit by King Hassan II
November 13, 1978	November 16, 1978	Hassan II	King	State visit.Afterwards visited Chicago. Departed U.S.November 29.
May 18, 1982	May 21, 1982	Hassan II	King	Official working visit. Private visit afterward to New York City and Chicago.
October 20, 1982	October 24, 1982	Hassan II	King	Official working visit. Led Arab League delegation presenting Middle East peace proposals
February 28, 1984	March 1, 1984	Karim Lamrani	Prime Minister	Official working visit. Private visit to New York City March 2.
September 26, 1990	September 26, 1990	Hassan II	King	Official visit.
January 30, 1992	January 30, 1992	Hassan II	King	Met with President Bush while attending a U.N Security Council Summit in New York City.
March 15, 1995	March 17, 1995	Hassan II	King	State Visit.
June 19, 2000	June 22, 2000	Mohammed VI	King	State Visit.
April 21, 2002	April 26, 2002	Mohammed VI	King	Working visit.
September 23, 2003	September 23, 2003	Mohammed VI	King	Met with President Bush at the UN General Assembly in New York City
July 7, 2004	July 8, 2004	Mohammed VI	King	Working visit.
April 12, 2010	April 13, 2010	Abbas El Fassi	Prime Minister	Attended the Nuclear Security Summit
November 22, 2013	November 22, 2013	Mohammed VI	King	Working visit.

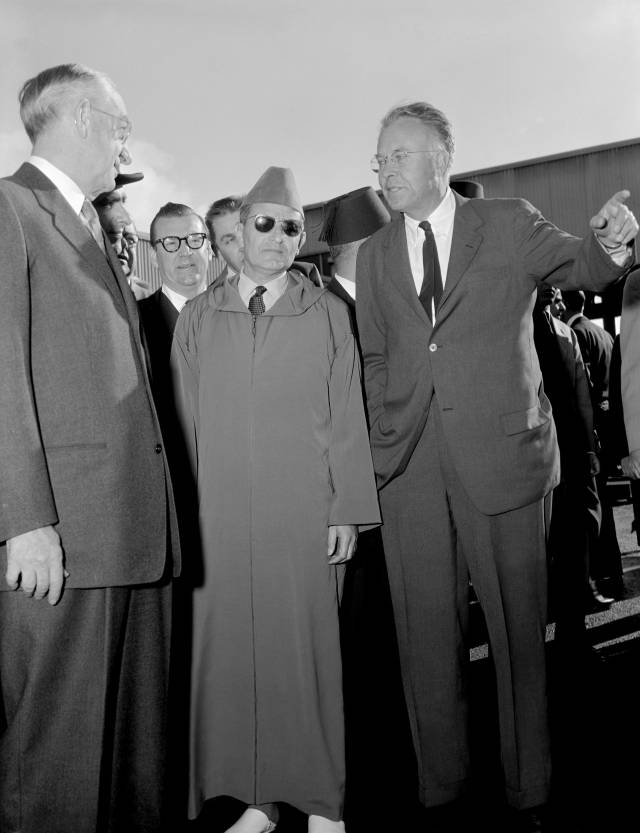

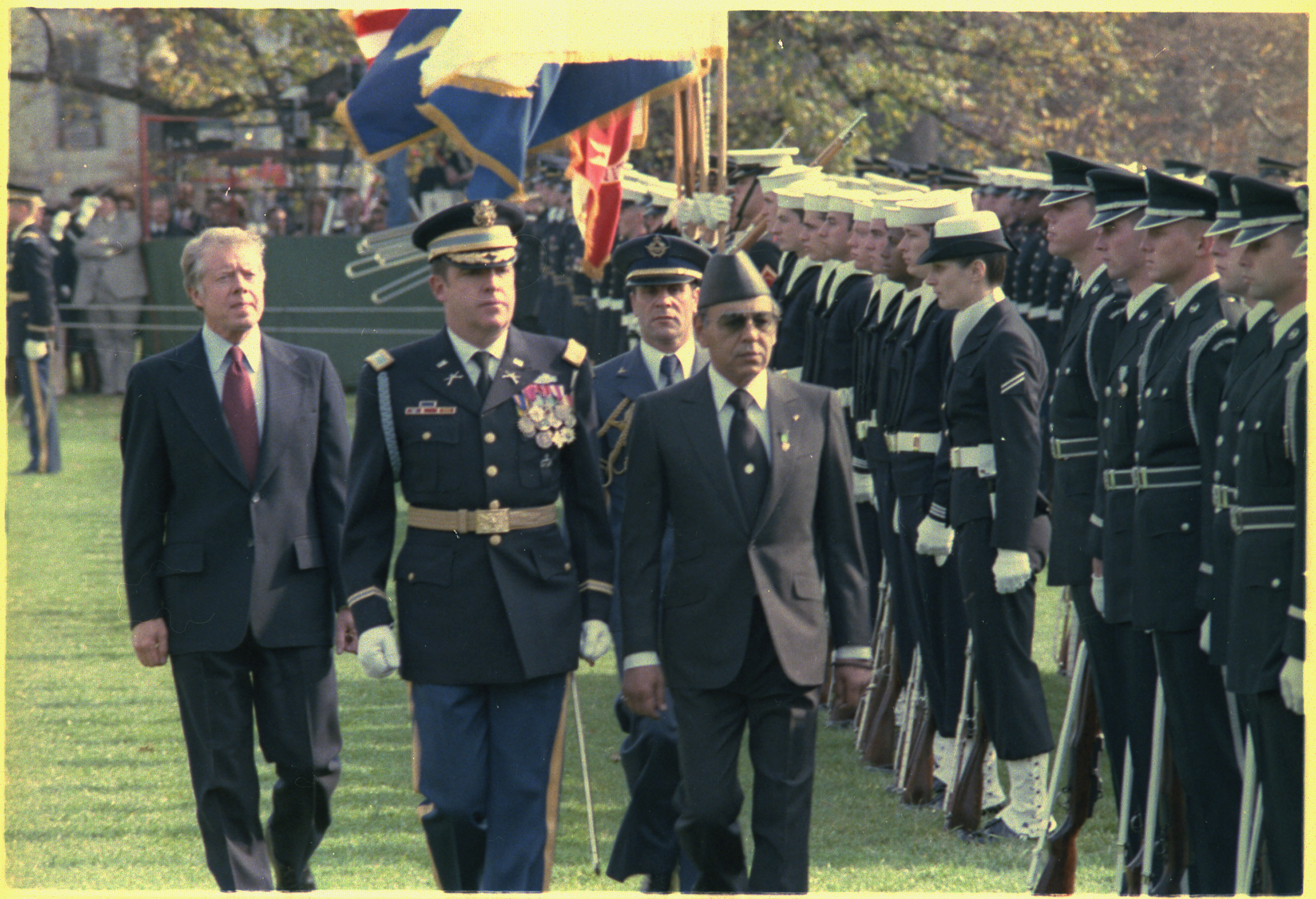

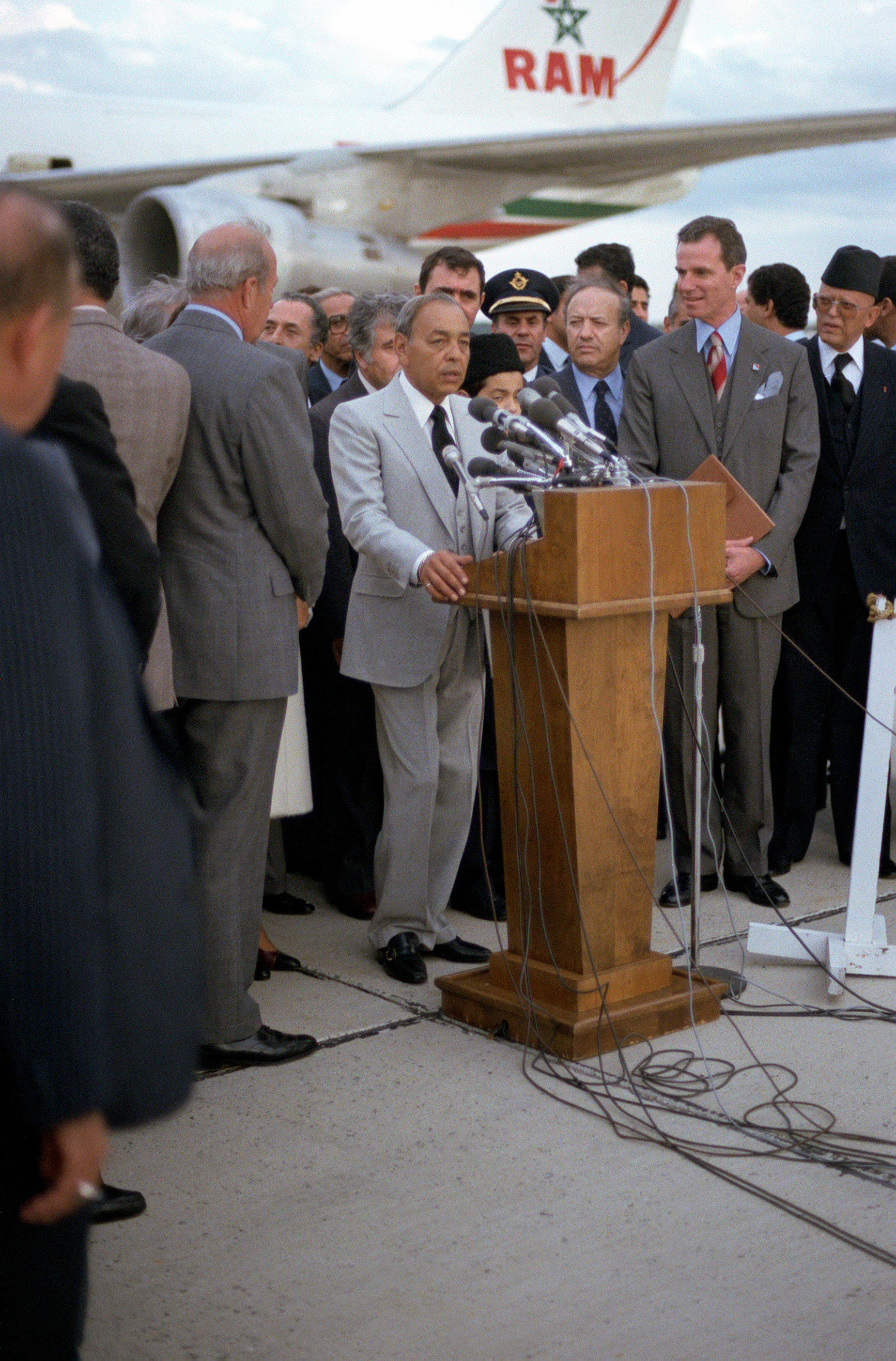

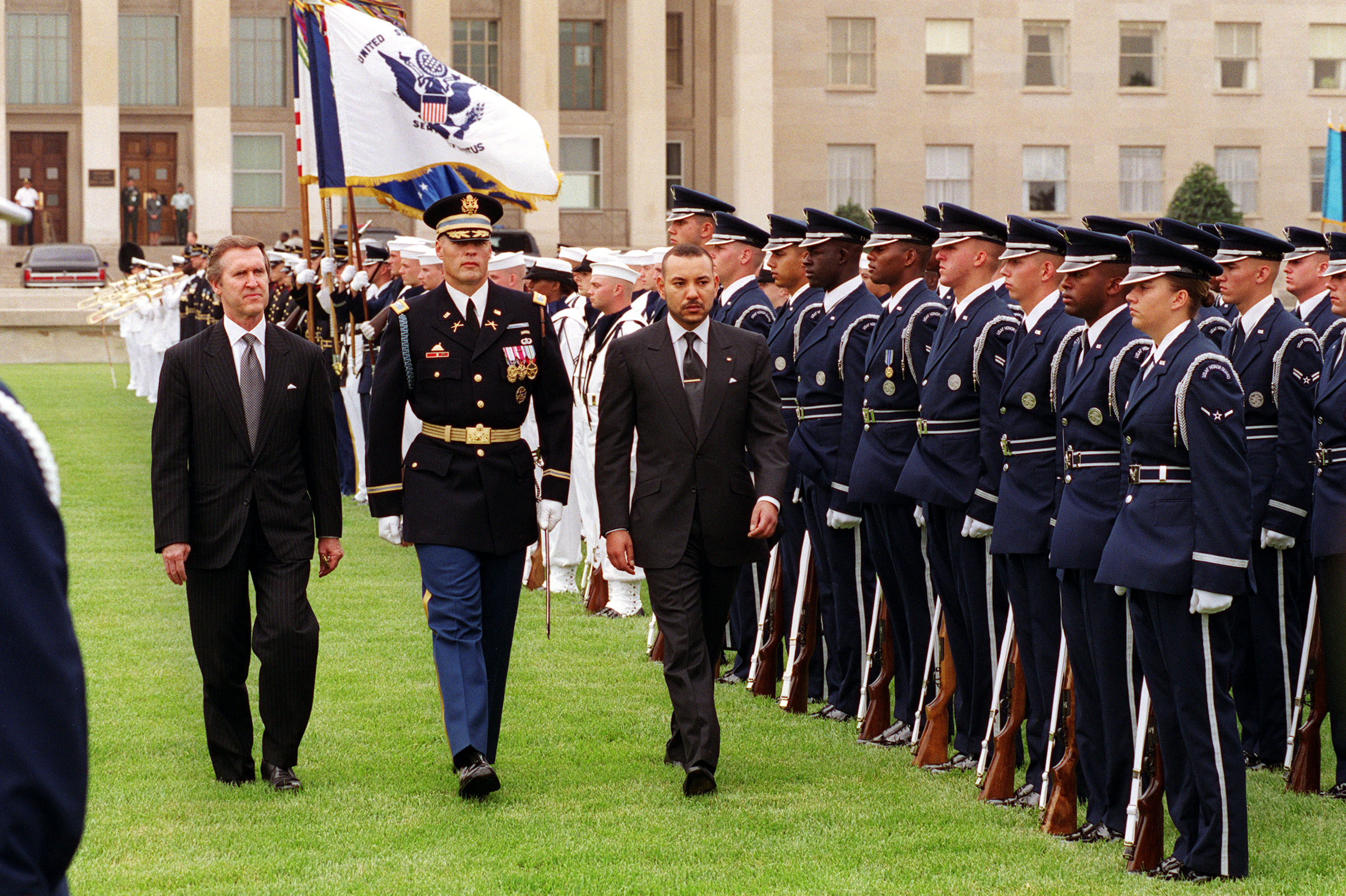

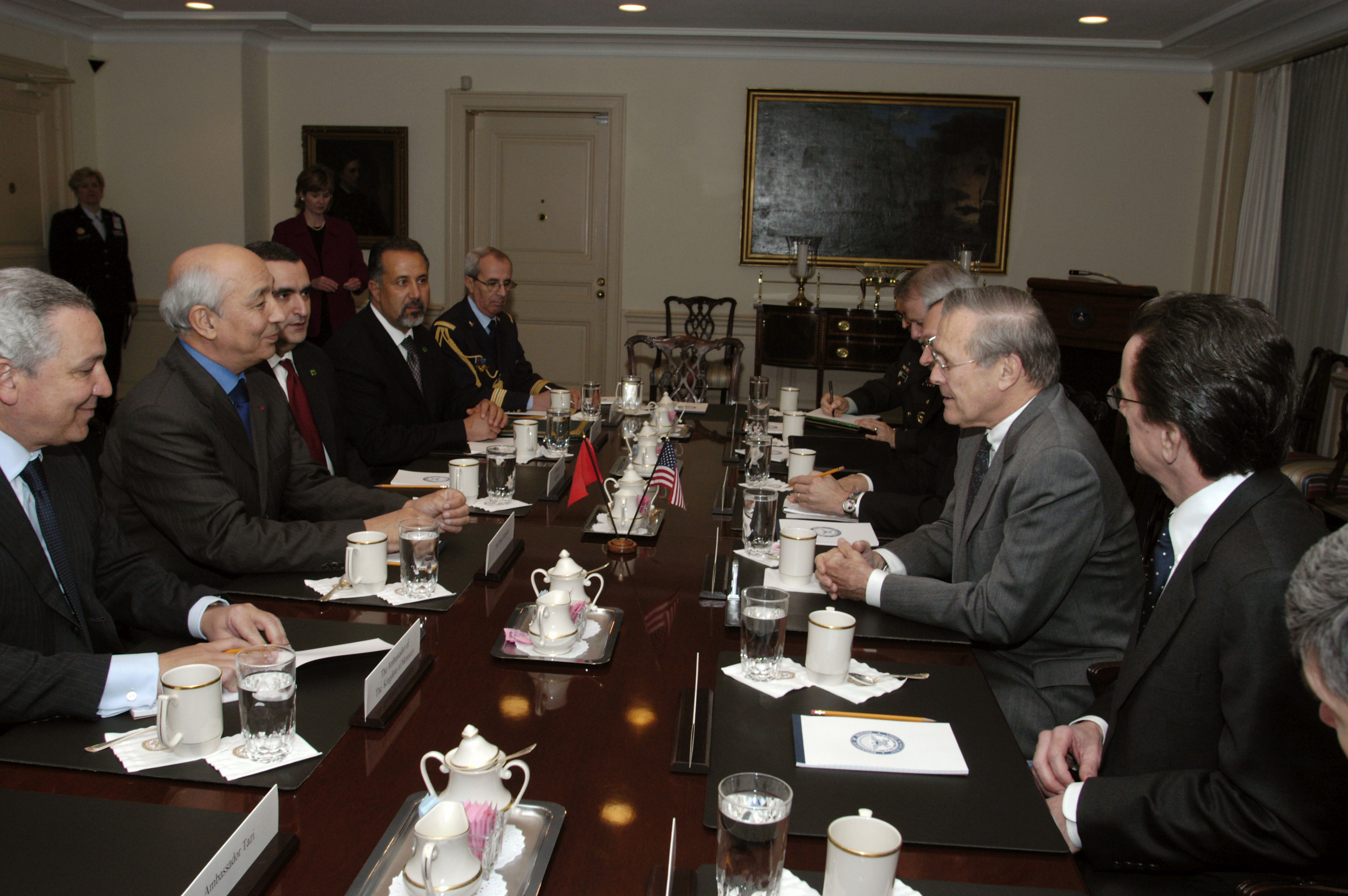

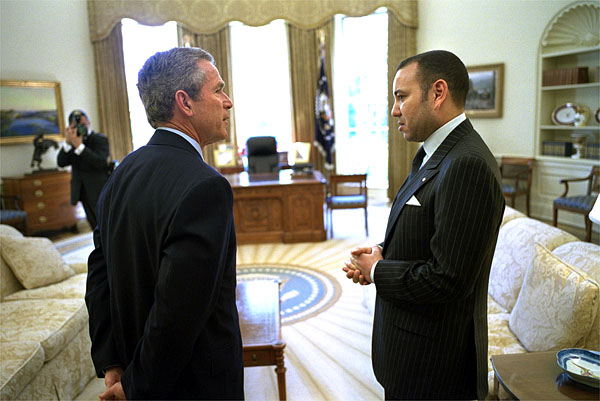

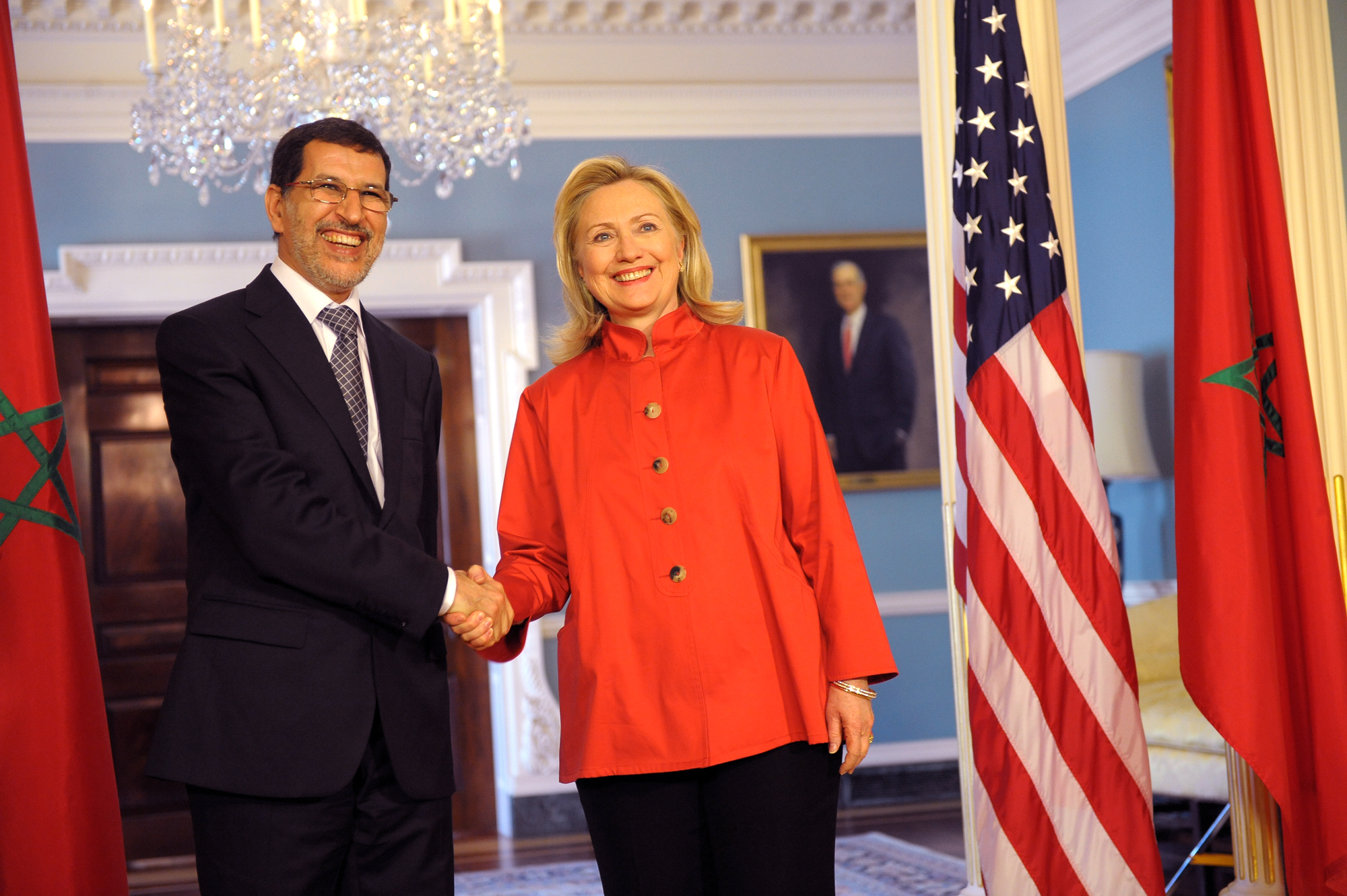

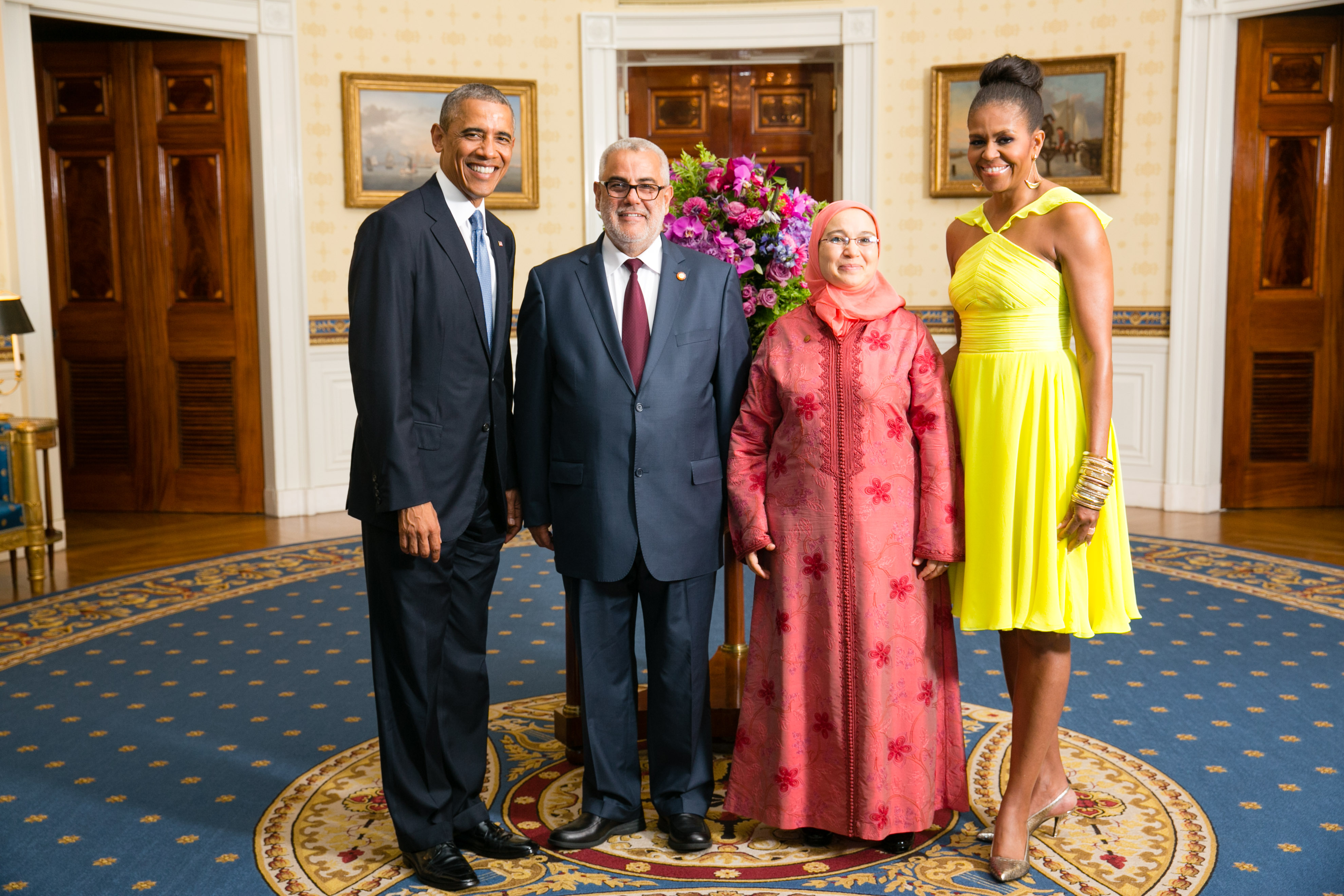

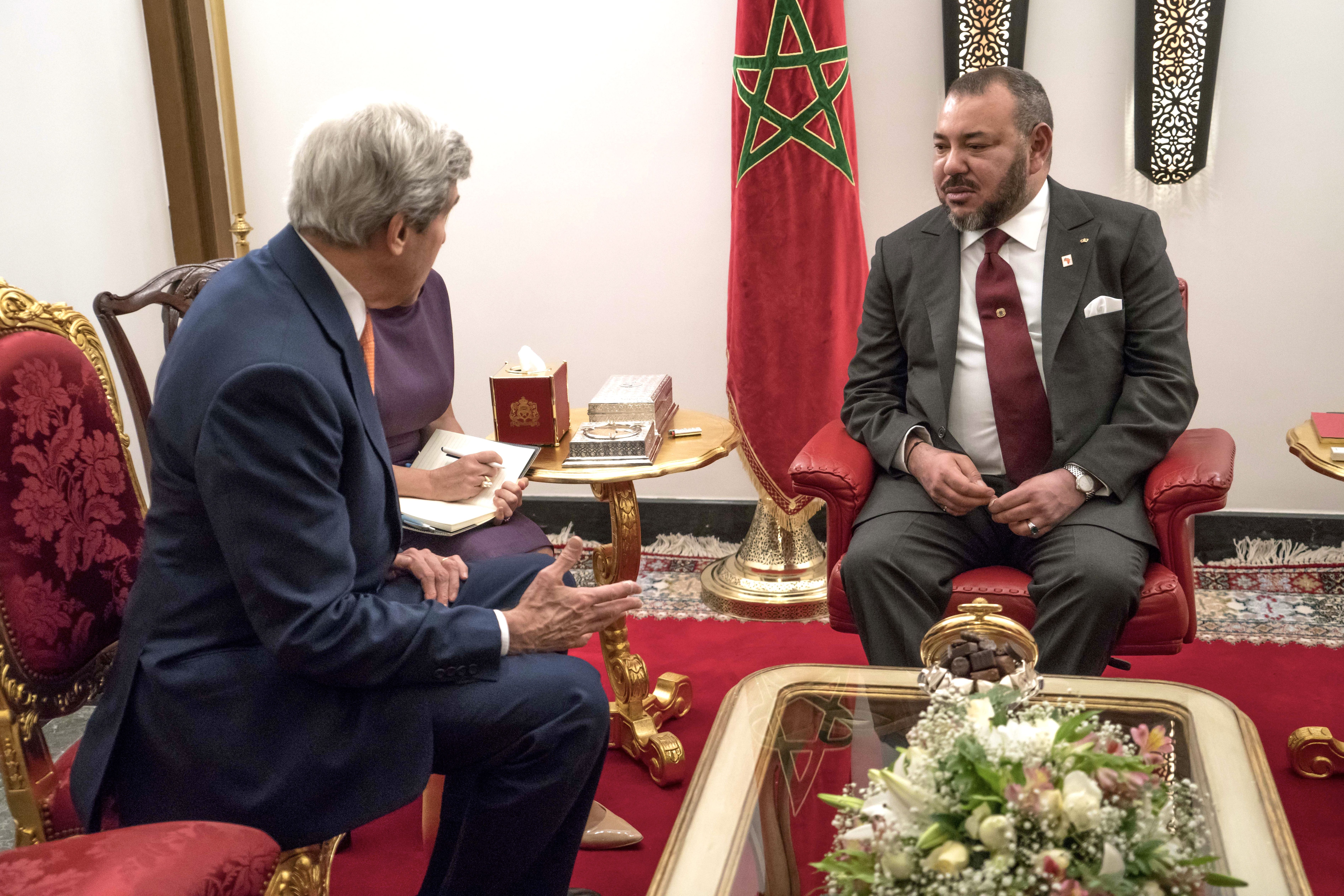

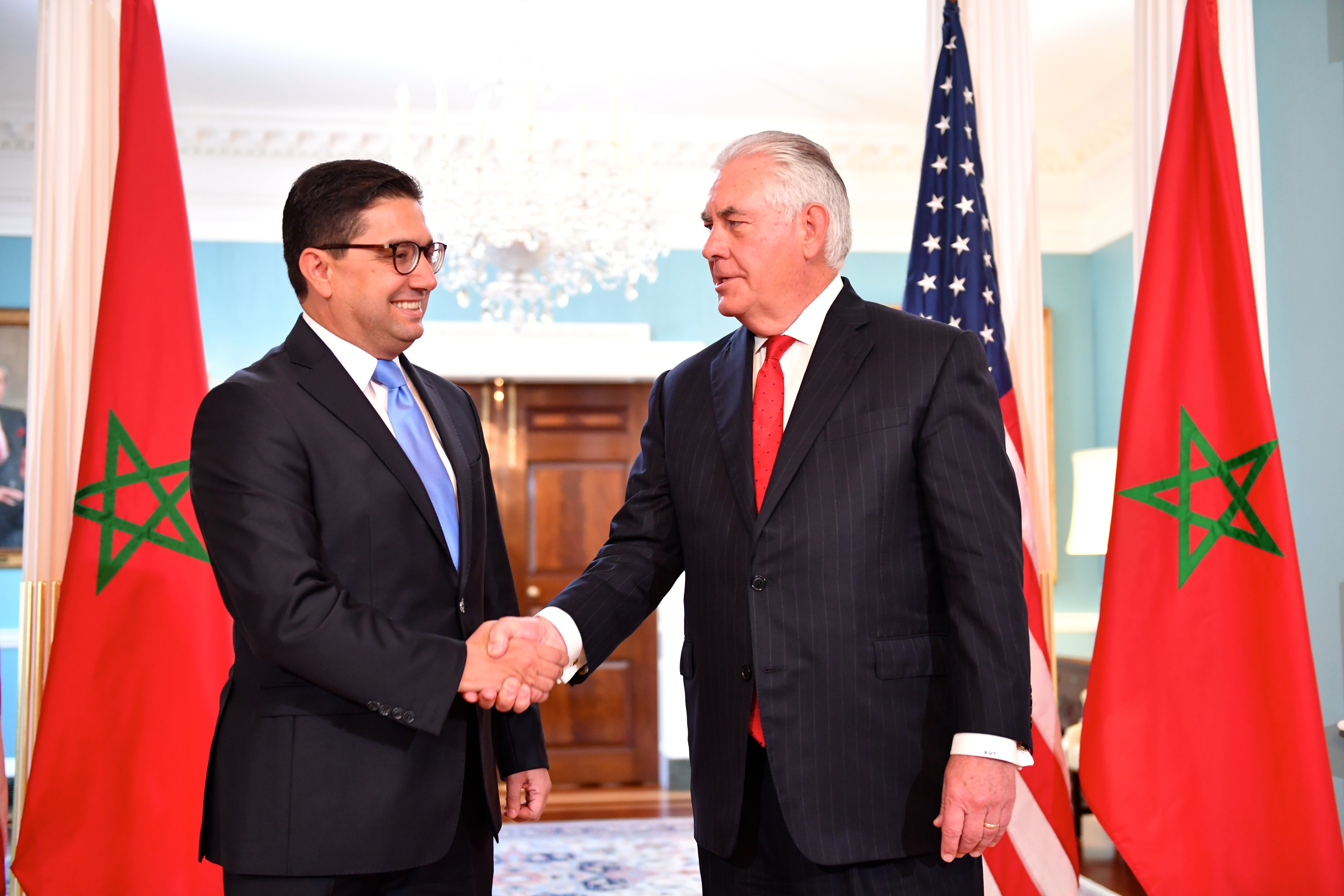

== Mauritania ==
Table of Trips
Start	End	Guest	Title	Reason
December 12, 1960	December 12, 1960	Moktar Ould Daddah	President	Met President Eisenhower
September 28, 1971	September 28, 1971	Moktar Ould Daddah	President	Private visit to Washington, D.C. while attending session of the U.N. General Assembly
August 5, 2014	August 6, 2014	Mohamed Ould Abdel Aziz	President	Attended the U.S.-Africa Leaders Summit.

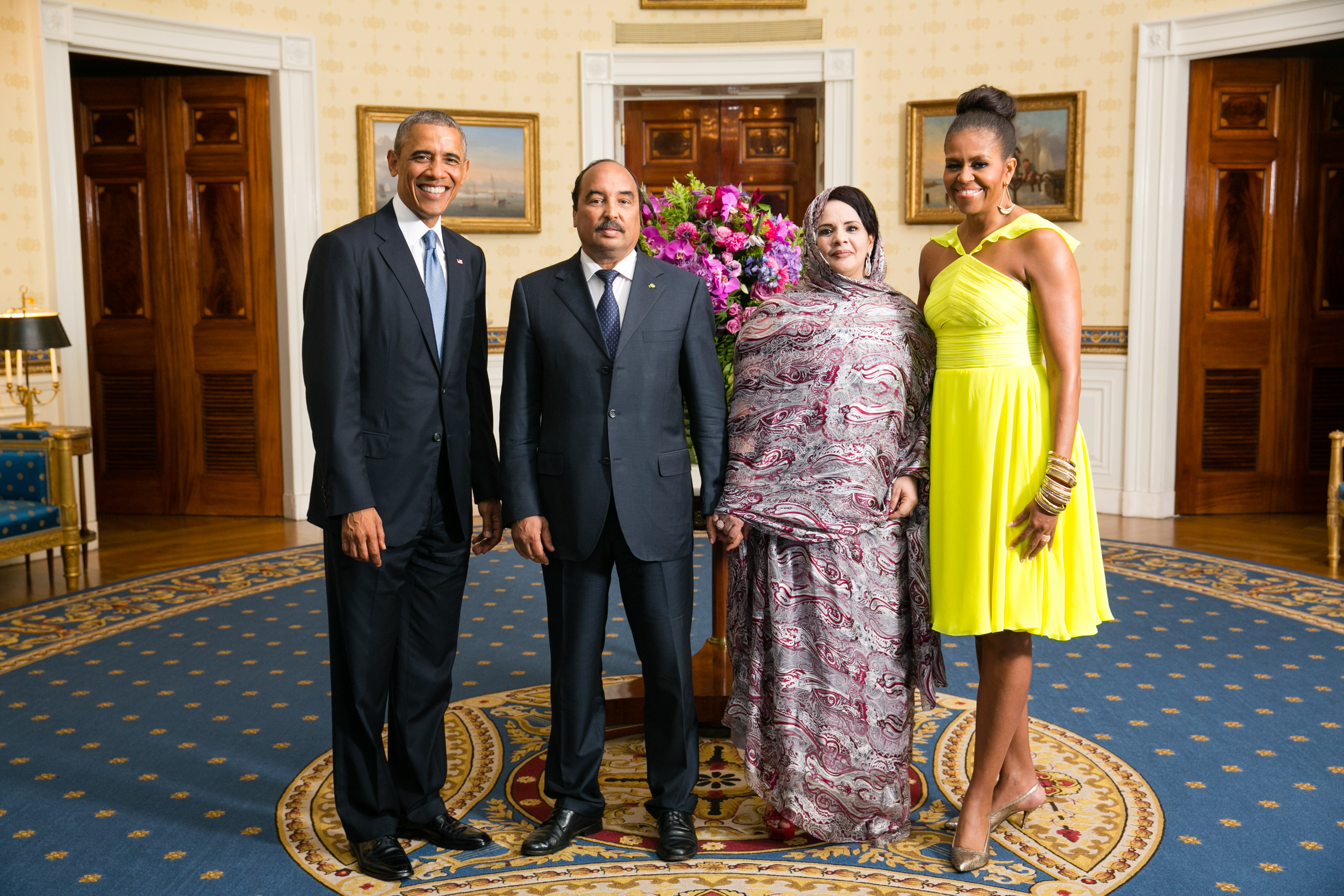

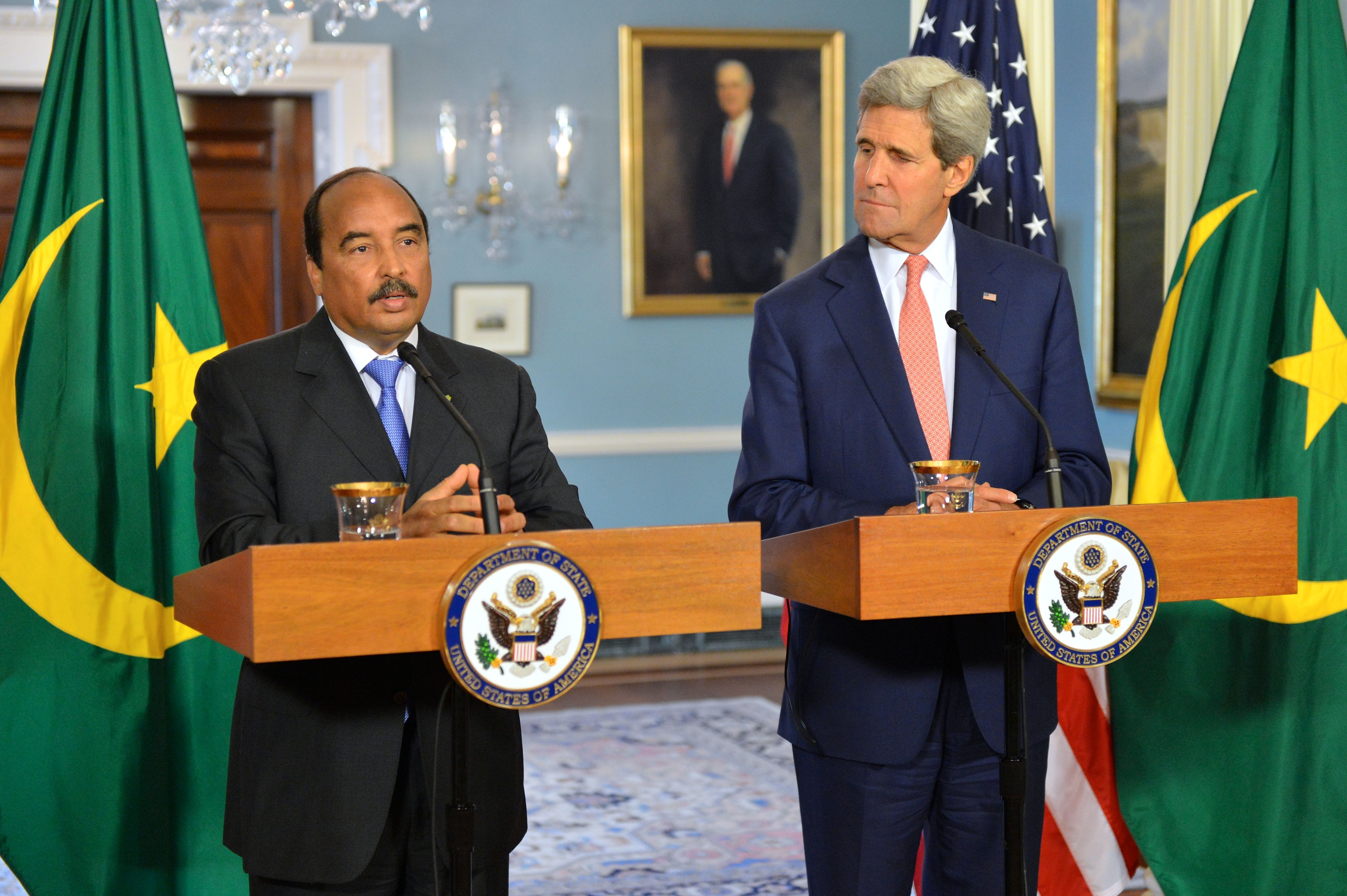

== Mauritius ==
Table of Trips
Start	End	Guest	Title	Reason
May 8, 1968	May 9, 1968	Seewoosagur Ramgoolam	Prime Minister	Informal visit.Afterwards visited Cape Kennedy.Departed U.S.May 10.
September 18, 1969	September 18, 1969	Seewoosagur Ramgoolam	Prime Minister	Met with President Nixon in New York City while attending a U.N. General Assembly session.
October 24, 1970	October 24, 1970	Seewoosagur Ramgoolam	Prime Minister	Attended White House dinner on 25th Anniversary of the U.N.
September 30, 1975	September 30, 1975	Seewoosagur Ramgoolam	Prime Minister	Private visit while attending U.N. General Assembly session.
October 12, 1981	October 16, 1981	Seewoosagur Ramgoolam	Prime Minister	Private visit.Met with President Reagan October 16.
June 4, 1991	June 6, 1991	Aneerood Jugnauth	Prime Minister	Official working visit.Private visit to New York City afterward.
June 23, 2003	June 27, 2003	Aneerood Jugnauth	Prime Minister	Working visit.Also attended United States-Africa Business Summit.
August 5, 2014	August 6, 2014	Navinchandra Ramgoolam	Prime Minister	Attended the U.S.-Africa Leaders Summit.

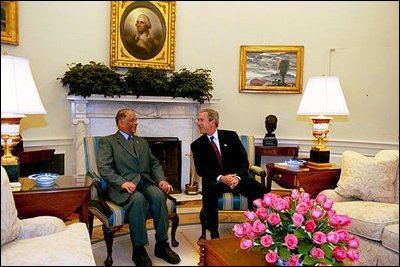

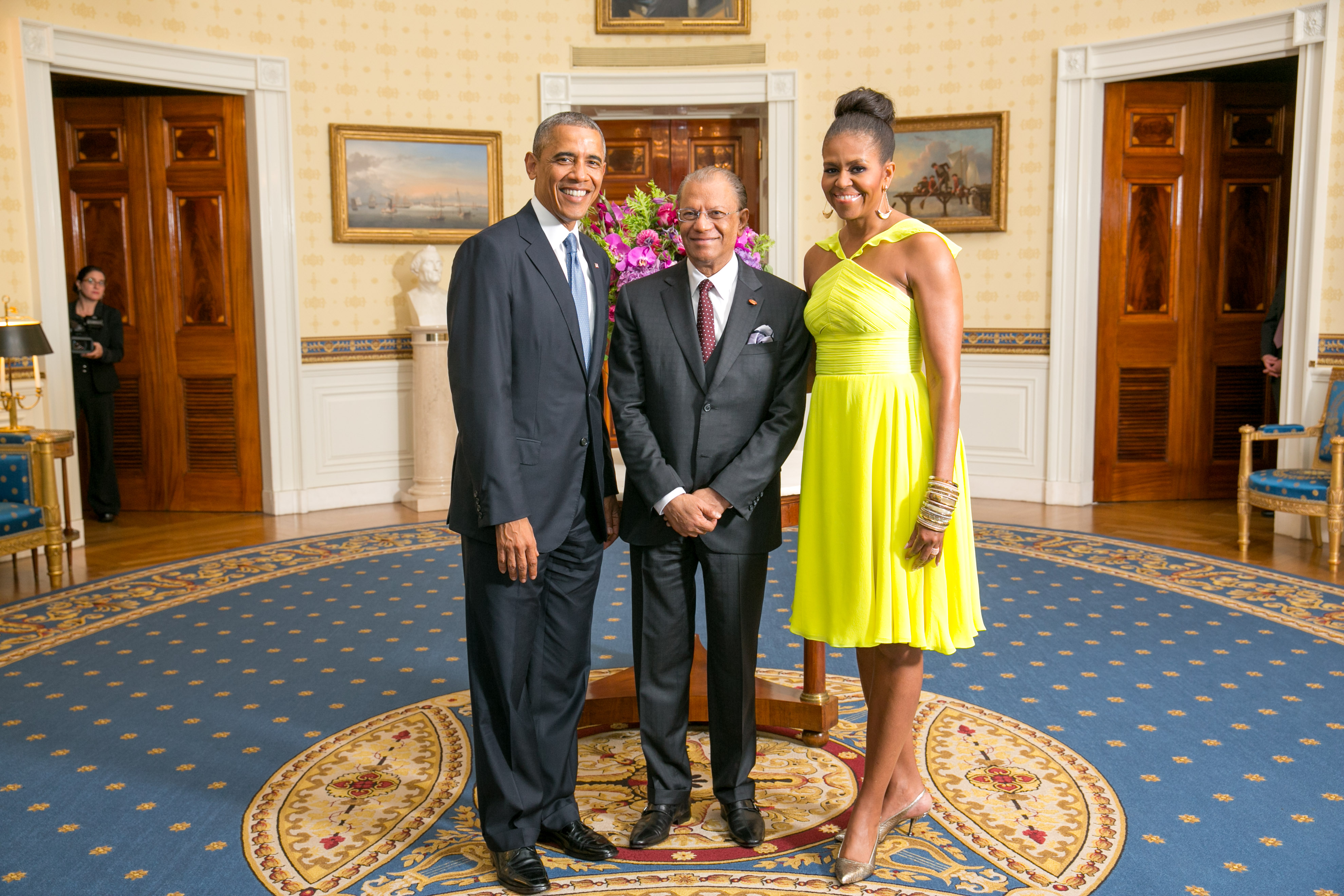

== Mozambique ==
Table of Trips
Start	End	Guest	Title	Reason
October 4, 1977	October 4, 1977	Samora Machel	President	Met with President Carter in New York City while attending U.N. General Assembly session.
September 17, 1985	September 21, 1985	Samora Machel	President	Official Working Visit.Private visit to Atlanta afterward.
October 5, 1987	October 5, 1987	Joaquim Chissano	President	Met with President Reagan during a private visit.
March 12, 1990	March 14, 1990	Joaquim Chissano	President	Official visit.
September 27, 1993	September 27, 1993	Joaquim Chissano	President	Met with President Clinton at the U.N. General Assembly in New York City
November 29, 1998	December 1, 1998	Joaquim Chissano	President	Working visit.
November 22, 2002	November 27, 2002	Joaquim Chissano	President	Working visit.
September 24, 2003	September 24, 2003	Joaquim Chissano	President	Met with President Bush at the U.N. General Assembly in New York City
June 12, 2005	June 13, 2005	Armando Guebuza	President	Working visit. Discussed African Growth and Opportunity Act

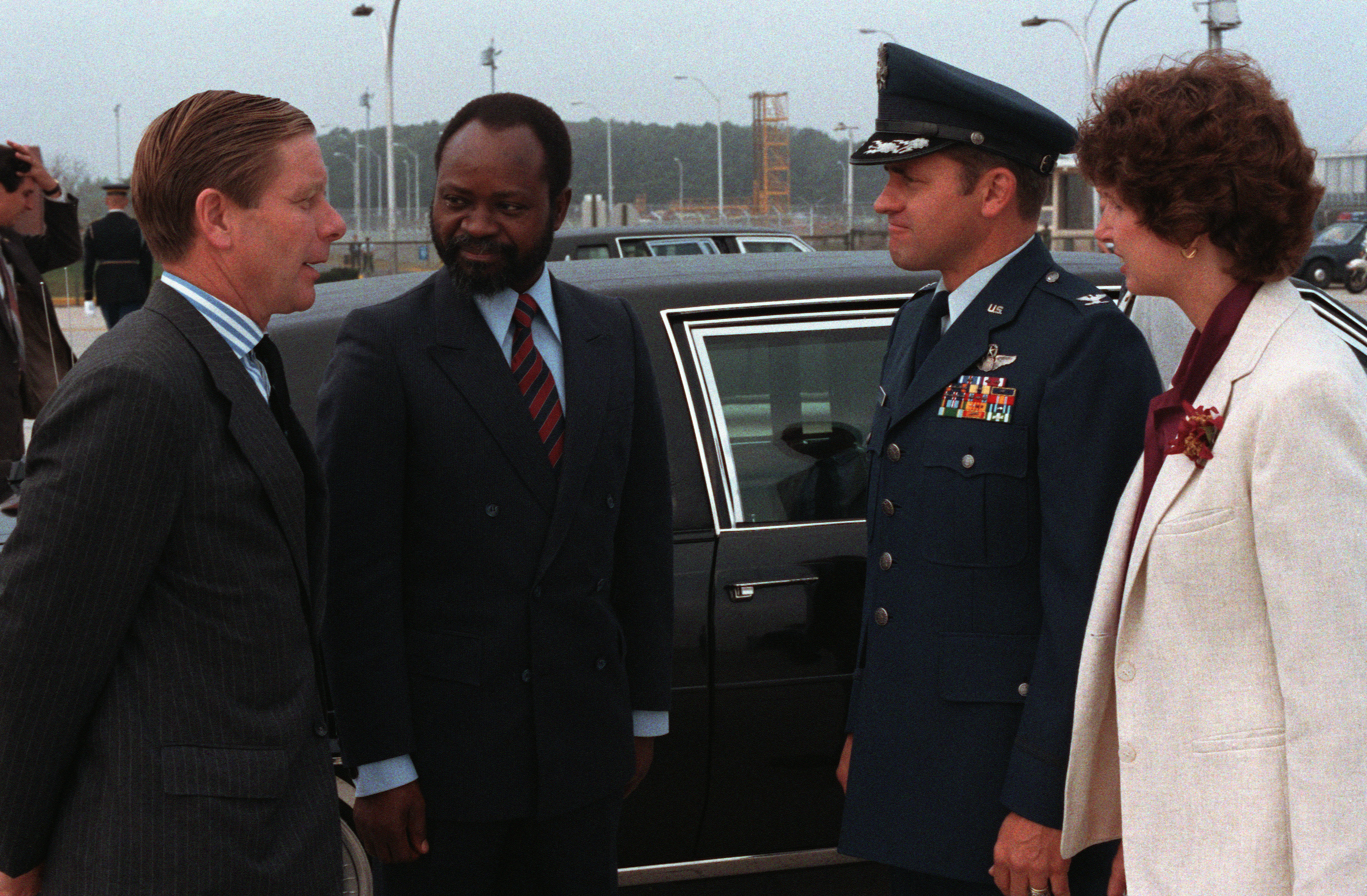

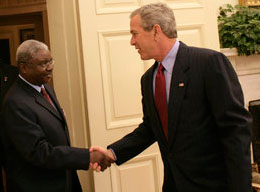

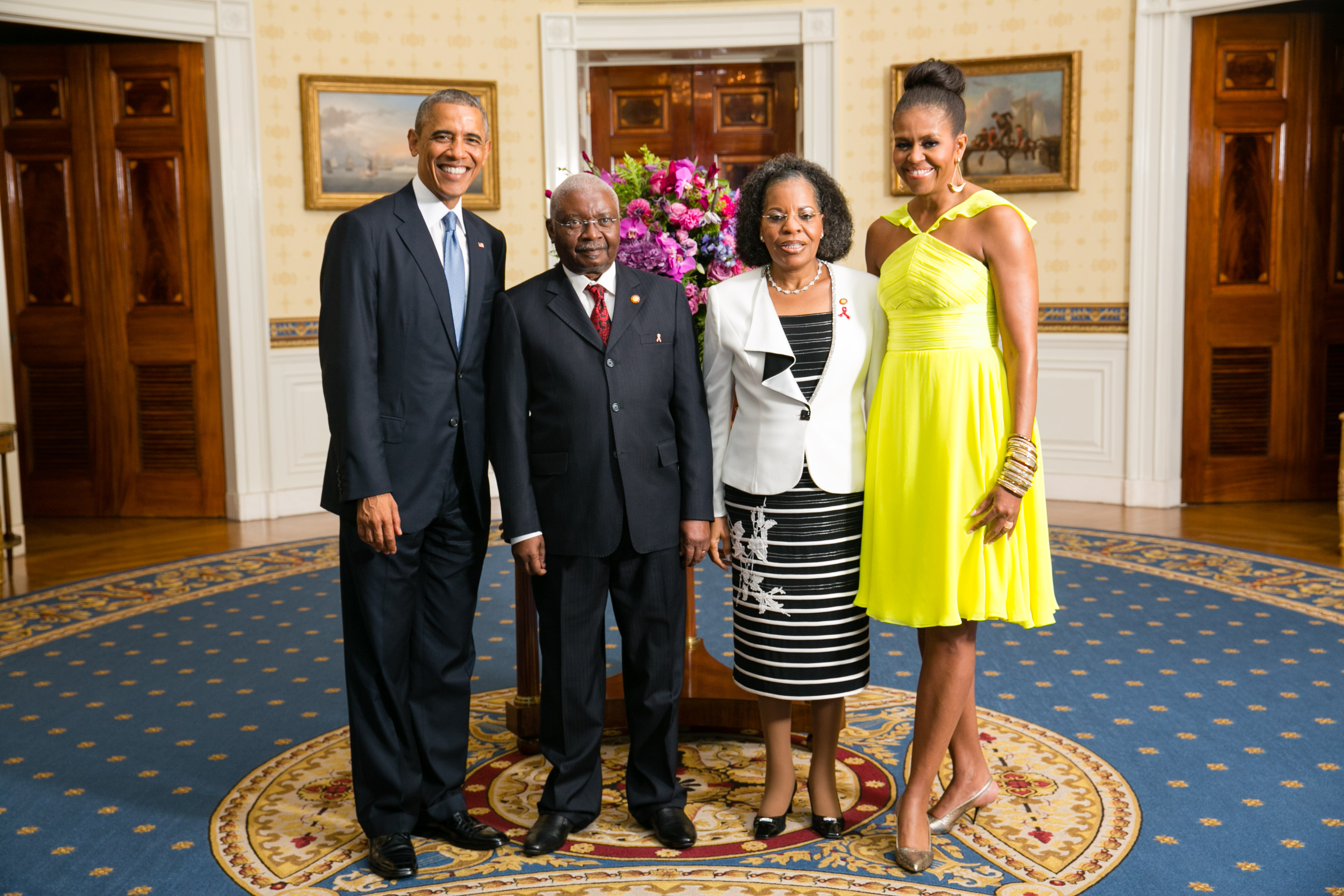

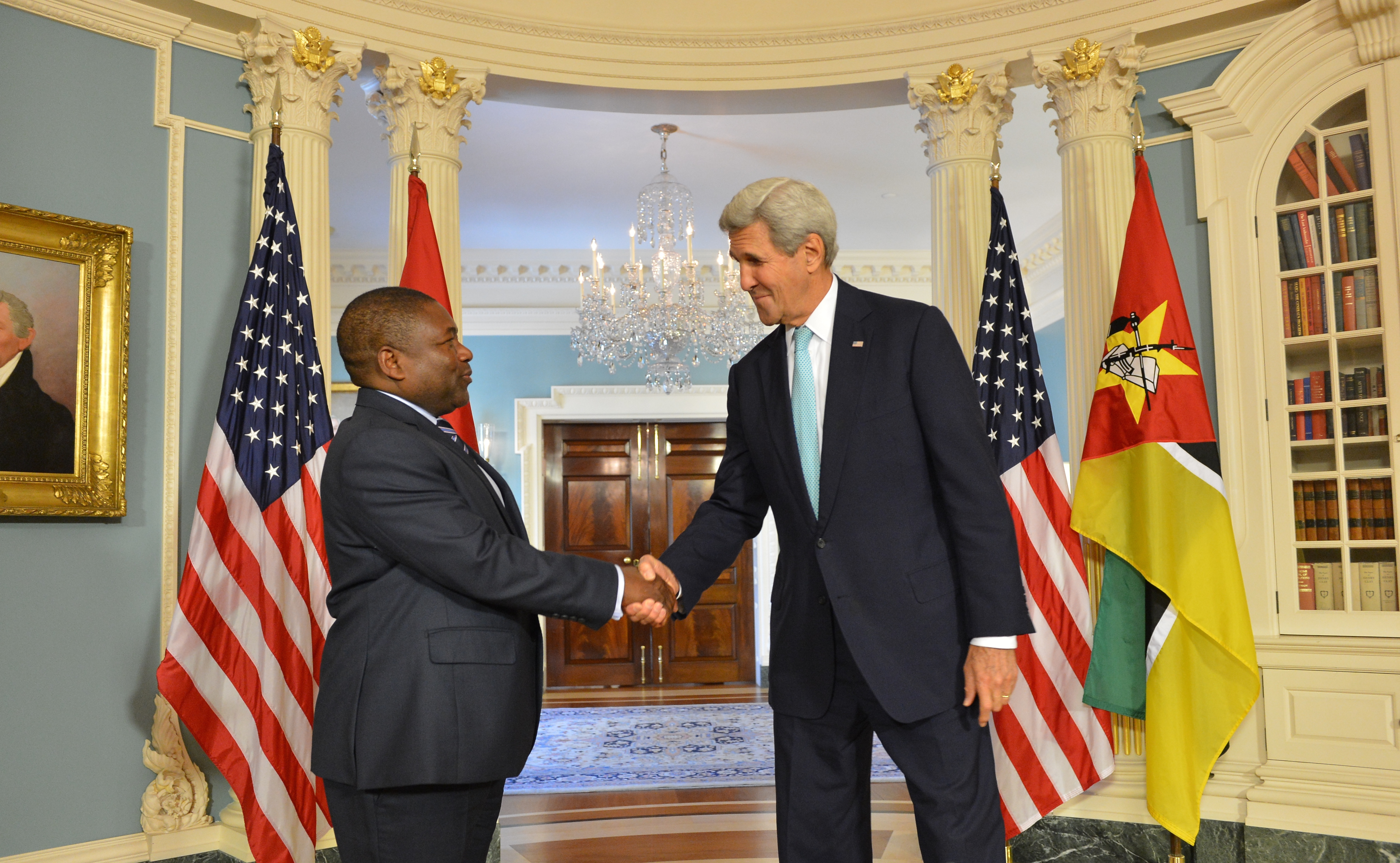

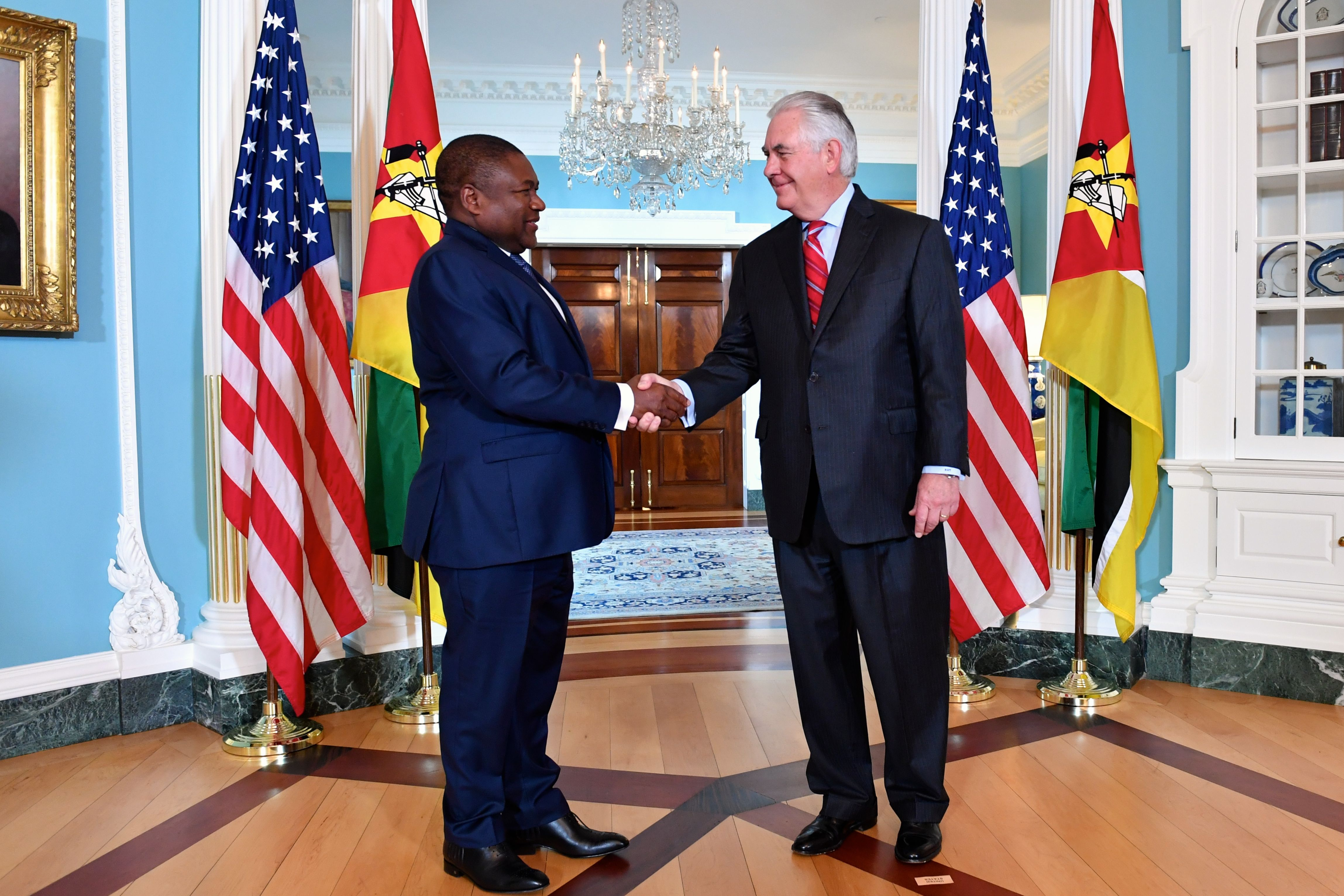

== Namibia ==
Table of Trips
Start	End	Guest	Title	Reason
June 19, 1990	June 19, 1990	Sam Nujoma	President	Private visit.
June 16, 1993	June 19, 1993	Sam Nujoma	President	Met with President Clinton during a private visit.
June 12, 2005	June 13, 2005	Hifikepunye Pohamba	President	Working visit.Discussed African Growth and Opportunity Act

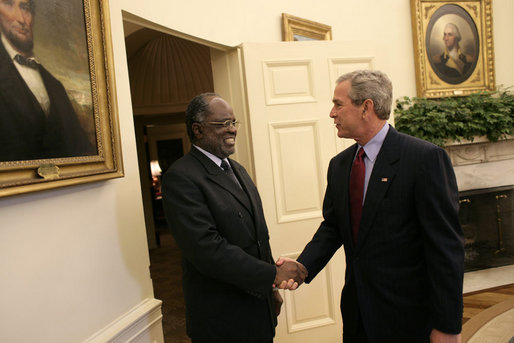

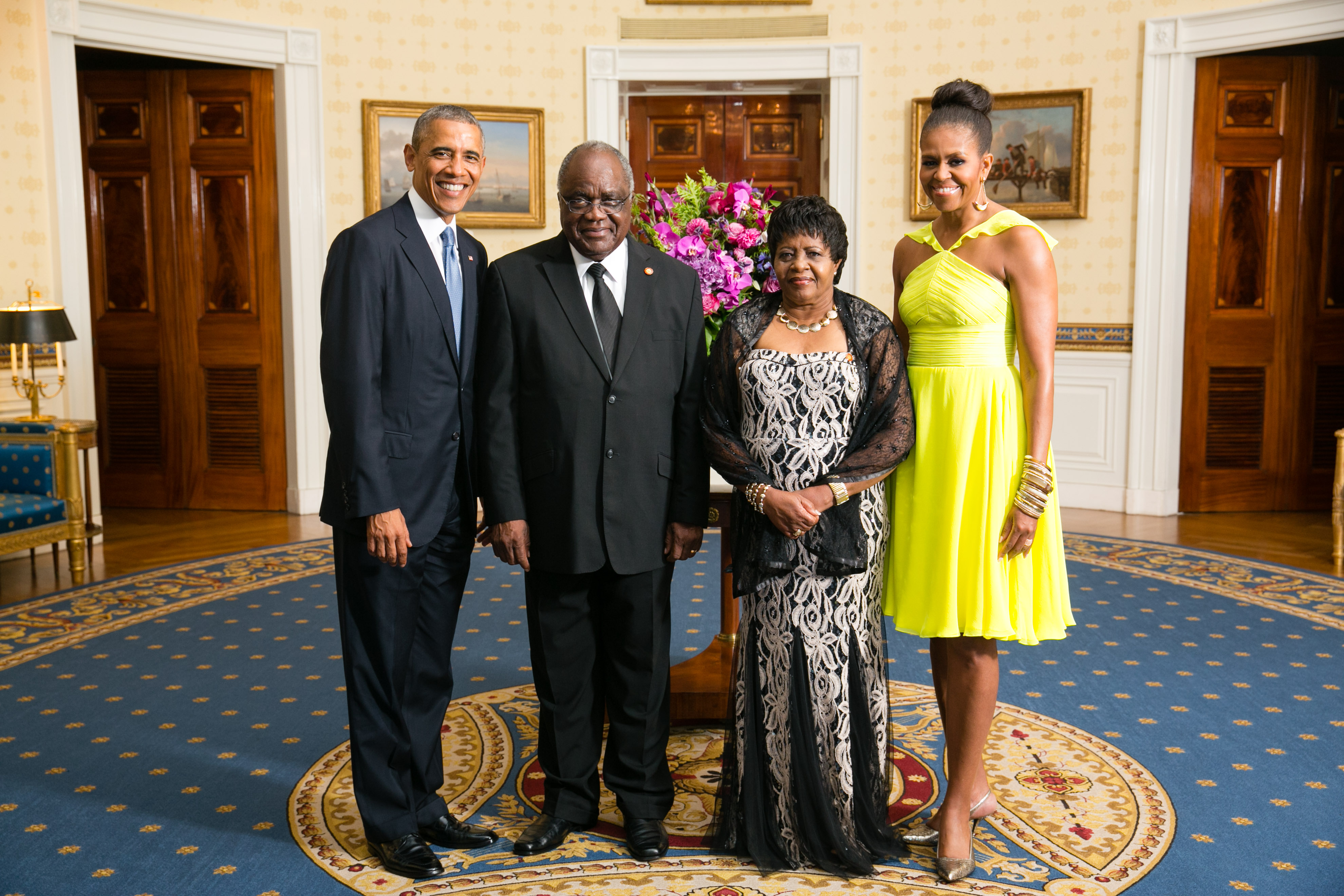

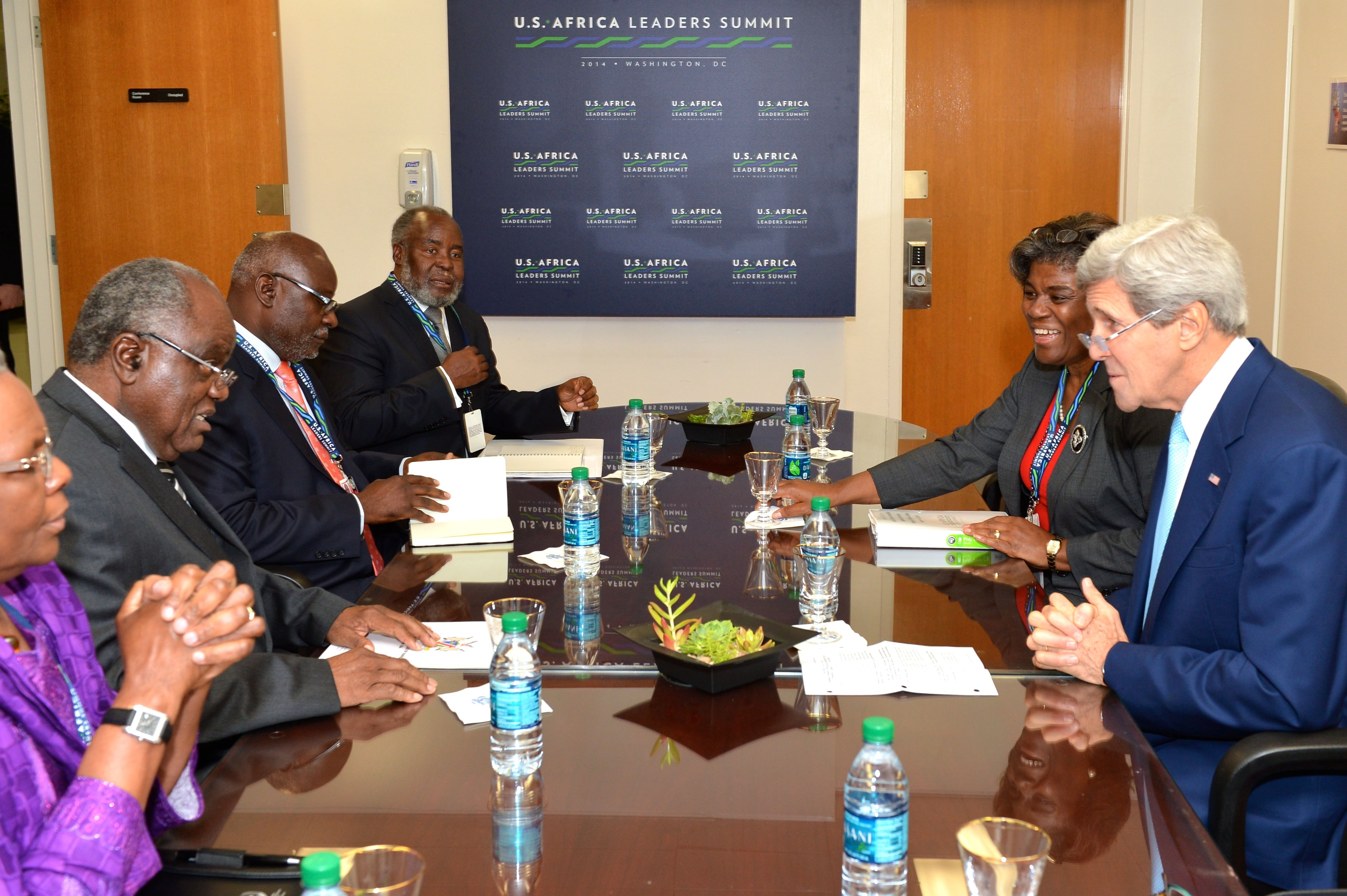

== Niger ==
Table of Trips
Start	End	Guest	Title	Reason
September 26, 1967	September 27, 1967	Hamani Diori	President	Official visit. In U.S.September 25-October 11; visited the U.S. Virgin Islands, Tucson, Chicago, New York City, and San Francisco.
December 10, 1984	December 13, 1984	Seyni Kountché	President	Official Working Visit.Private visit afterwards to Columbus
June 12, 2005	June 13, 2005	Mamadou Tandja	President	Working visit.Discussed African Growth and Opportunity Act
September 29, 2011	September 29, 2011	Mahamadou Issoufou	President	Working visit

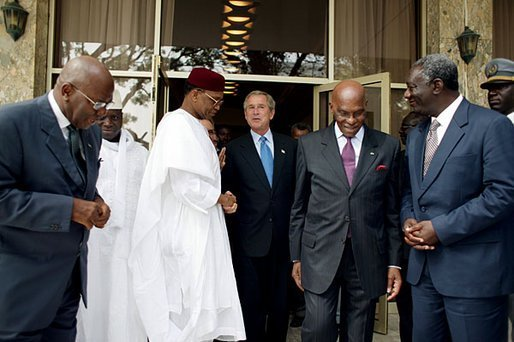

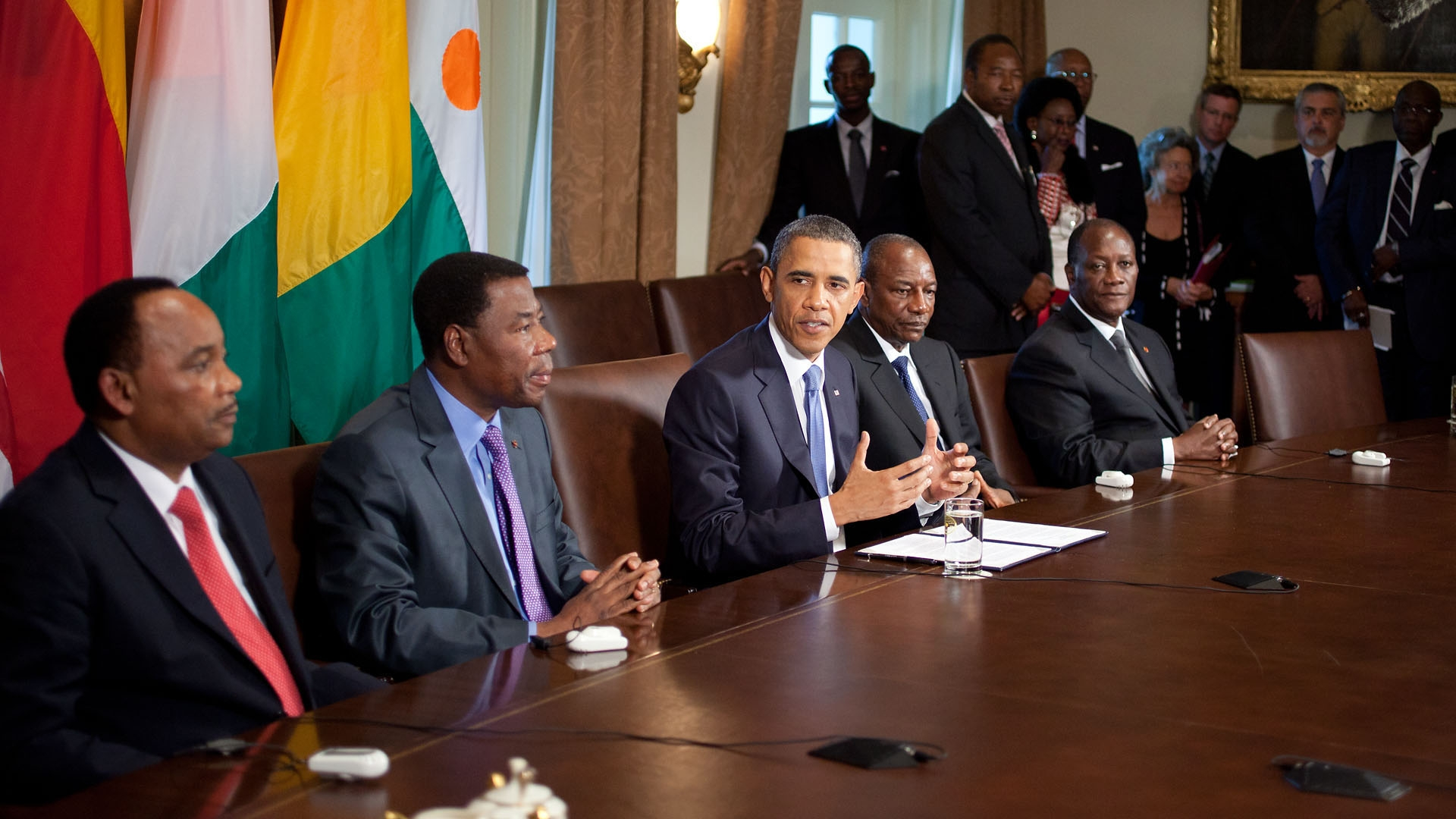

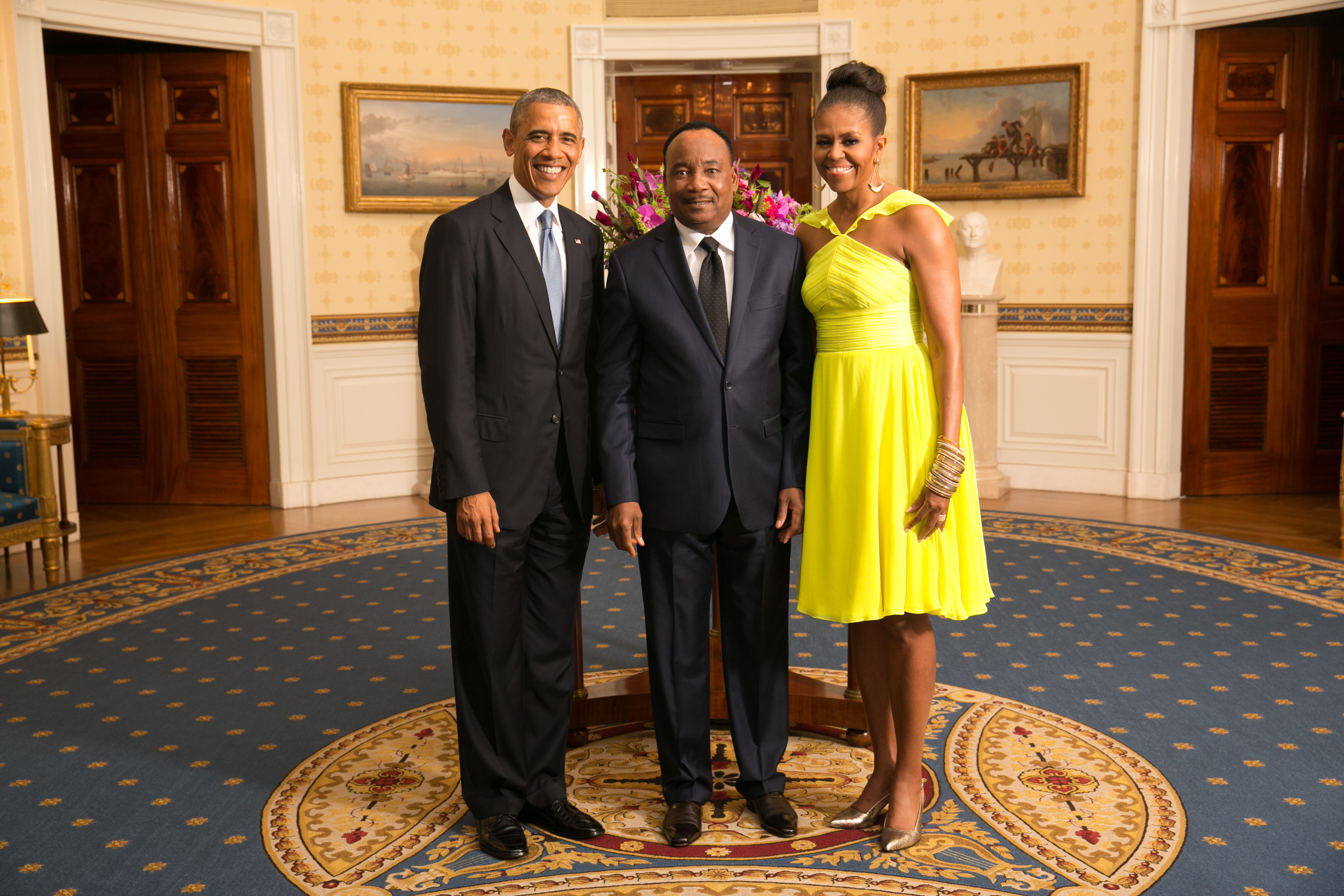

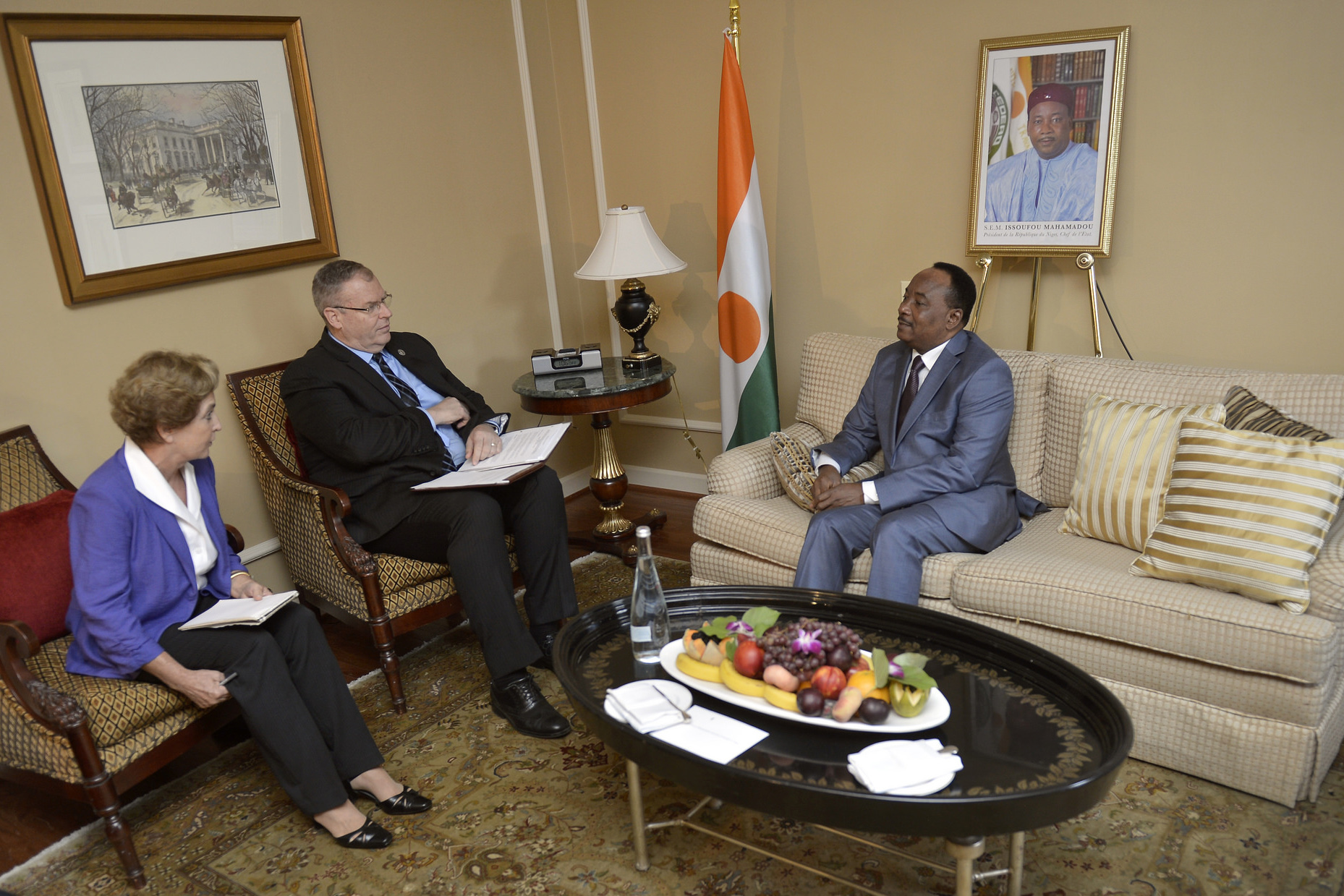

== Nigeria ==
Table of Trips
Start	End	Guest	Title	Reason
October 8, 1960	October 8, 1960	Abubakar Tafawa Balewa	Prime Minister	Met with President Eisenhower in Washington, D.C. while attending UN General Assembly
July 25, 1961	July 28, 1961	Abubakar Tafawa Balewa	Prime Minister	Official visit. In U.S.July 24 – August 1, visiting New York City, Chicago, and Knoxville
October 10, 1977	October 13, 1977	Olusegun Obasanjo	President	Official Visit. Afterwards visited New York City.Departed U.S.September 15
October 3, 1980	October 8, 1980	Shehu Shagari	President	State visit.
March 30, 1999	March 30, 1999	Olusegun Obasanjo	President	Met with President Clinton during a private visit. Arrived in New York City March 29.
October 27, 1999	October 30, 1999	Olusegun Obasanjo	President	Official working visit.
May 10, 2001	May 12, 2001	Olusegun Obasanjo	President	Working visit.
November 2, 2001	November 2, 2001	Olusegun Obasanjo	President	Met with President Bush during a private visit.
June 20, 2002	June 20, 2002	Olusegun Obasanjo	President	Met with President Bush during a private visit.
June 10, 2004	June 11, 2004	Olusegun Obasanjo	President	Met with President Bush during the G-8 Economic Summit at Sea Island. Attended the funeral of Former President Reagan.
December 2, 2004	December 3, 2004	Olusegun Obasanjo	President	Working visit.
May 5, 2005	May 5, 2005	Olusegun Obasanjo	President	Working visit.
March 28, 2006	March 29, 2006	Olusegun Obasanjo	President	Working visit.
December 12, 2007	December 15, 2007	Umaru Yar'Adua	President	Working visit.
April 11, 2010	April 13, 2010	Goodluck Jonathan	President	Attended the Nuclear Security Summit.
June 8, 2011	June 8, 2011	Goodluck Jonathan	President	Working visit.
September 23, 2013	September 23, 2013	Goodluck Jonathan	President	Met with President Obama at the UN General Assembly in New York City.
July 20, 2015	July 21, 2015	Muhammadu Buhari	President	Working visit.
March 31, 2016	April 1, 2016	Muhammadu Buhari	President	Attended the Nuclear Security Summit.
April 29, 2018	May 1, 2018	Muhammadu Buhari	President	Official Working visit.

== Rwanda ==
Table of Trips
Start	End	Guest	Title	Reason
September 19, 1962	September 22, 1962	Grégoire Kayibanda	President	Informal visit while attending UN General Assembly
August 14, 1967	August 14, 1967	Grégoire Kayibanda	President	Informal visit. In U.S.August 13–14; visited New York City
September 24, 1980	September 26, 1980	Juvenal Habyarimana	President	Private visit. Met with President Carter September 25.
October 19, 1995	October 19, 1995	Pasteur Bizimungu	President	Attended Africare dinner with President Clinton
September 13, 2002	September 13, 2002	Paul Kagame	President	Met with President Bush at the UN General Assembly in New York City
March 3, 2003	March 6, 2003	Paul Kagame	President	Working visit.
April 15, 2005	April 15, 2005	Paul Kagame	President	Working visit.
May 30, 2006	June 2, 2006	Paul Kagame	President	Working visit.

== Seychelles ==
Table of Trips
Start	End	Guest	Title	Reason
July 20, 1989	July 20, 1989	France-Albert René	President	Met with President Bush during a private visit.
August 5, 2014	August 6, 2014	James Michel	President	Attended the U.S.-Africa Leaders Summit.
September 20, 2022		Wavel Ramkalawan	President	Attended the United Nations General Assembly

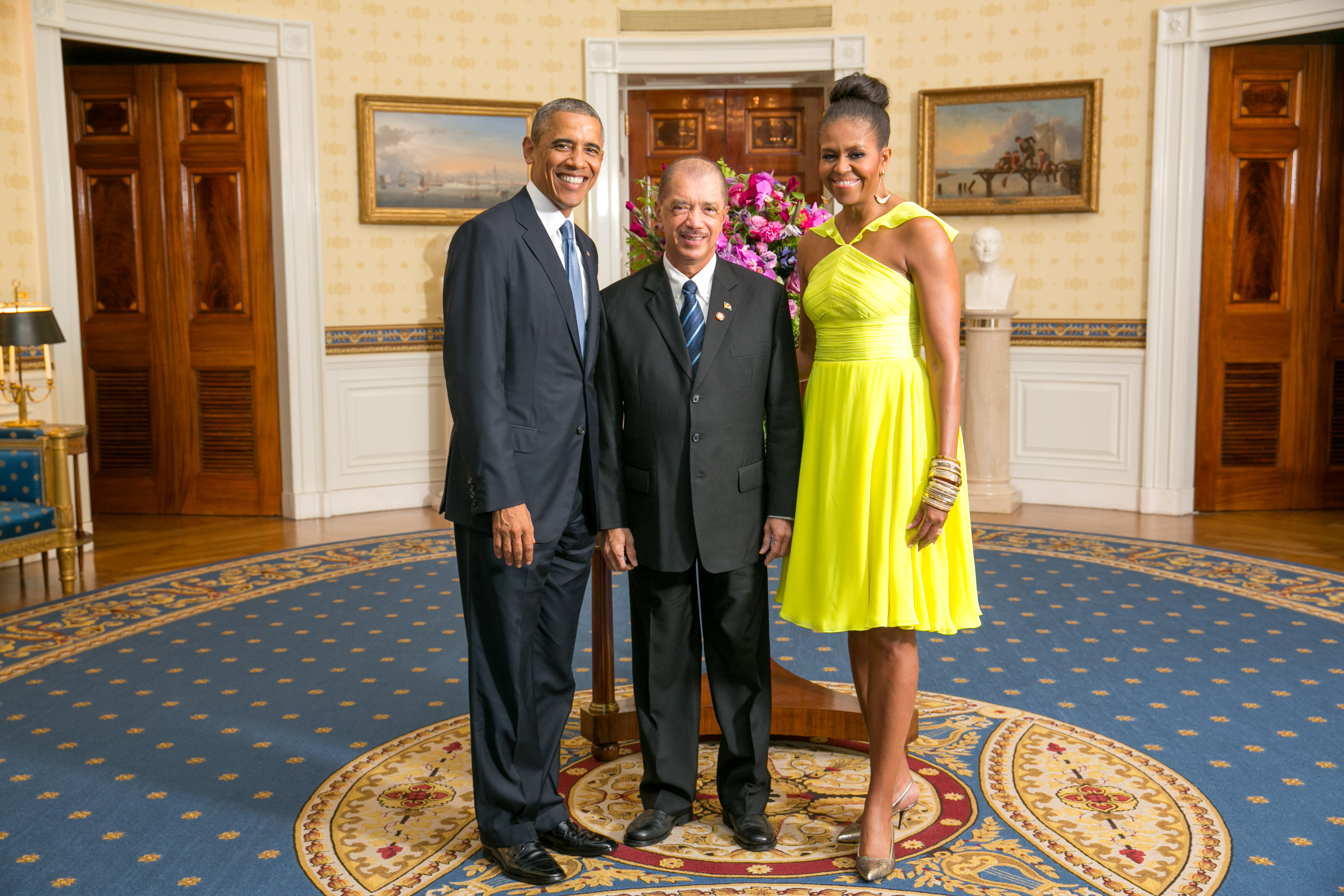

== Senegal ==
Table of Trips
Start	End	Guest	Title	Reason
November 3, 1961	November 3, 1961	Léopold Sédar Senghor	President	Official visit. In U.S. October 30 – November 4. Also visited New York City.
September 28, 1966	September 28, 1966	Léopold Sédar Senghor	President	State Visit.
October 24, 1970	October 24, 1970	Abdou Diouf	Prime Minister	Attended White House dinner on 25th Anniversary of the U.N.
June 18, 1971	June 18, 1971	Léopold Sédar Senghor	President	Private visit. In the U.S. June 12–18. Also visited Cambridge
May 22, 1975	May 22, 1975	Léopold Sédar Senghor	President	Private visit.
June 8, 1978	June 8, 1978	Léopold Sédar Senghor	President	Private visit.
April 5, 1980	April 8, 1980	Léopold Sédar Senghor	President	Private visit. Met with President Carter April 8.
August 9, 1983	August 9, 1983	Abdou Diouf	President	Official working visit.
April 13, 1985	April 17, 1985	Abdou Diouf	President	Private Visit. Met with President Reagan April 16.
May 14, 1990	May 14, 1990	Abdou Diouf	President	Private visit.
September 9, 1991	September 12, 1991	Abdou Diouf	President	State Visit.
May 21, 1994	May 23, 1994	Abdou Diouf	President	Met with President Clinton during a private visit.
June 28, 2001	June 28, 2001	Abdoulaye Wade	President	Working visit; attended a forum of the Partnership to Cut Hunger in Africa.
June 18, 2002	June 18, 2002	Abdoulaye Wade	President	Met with President Bush during a private visit.
June 9, 2004	June 10, 2004	Abdoulaye Wade	President	Met with President Bush at the G-8 Economic Summit at Sea Island
December 5, 2004	December 7, 2004	Abdoulaye Wade	President	Working visit.
March 28, 2013		Macky Sall	President	Attended African Leaders Summit.
September 20, 2022		Macky Sall	President	Attended the United Nations General Assembly.

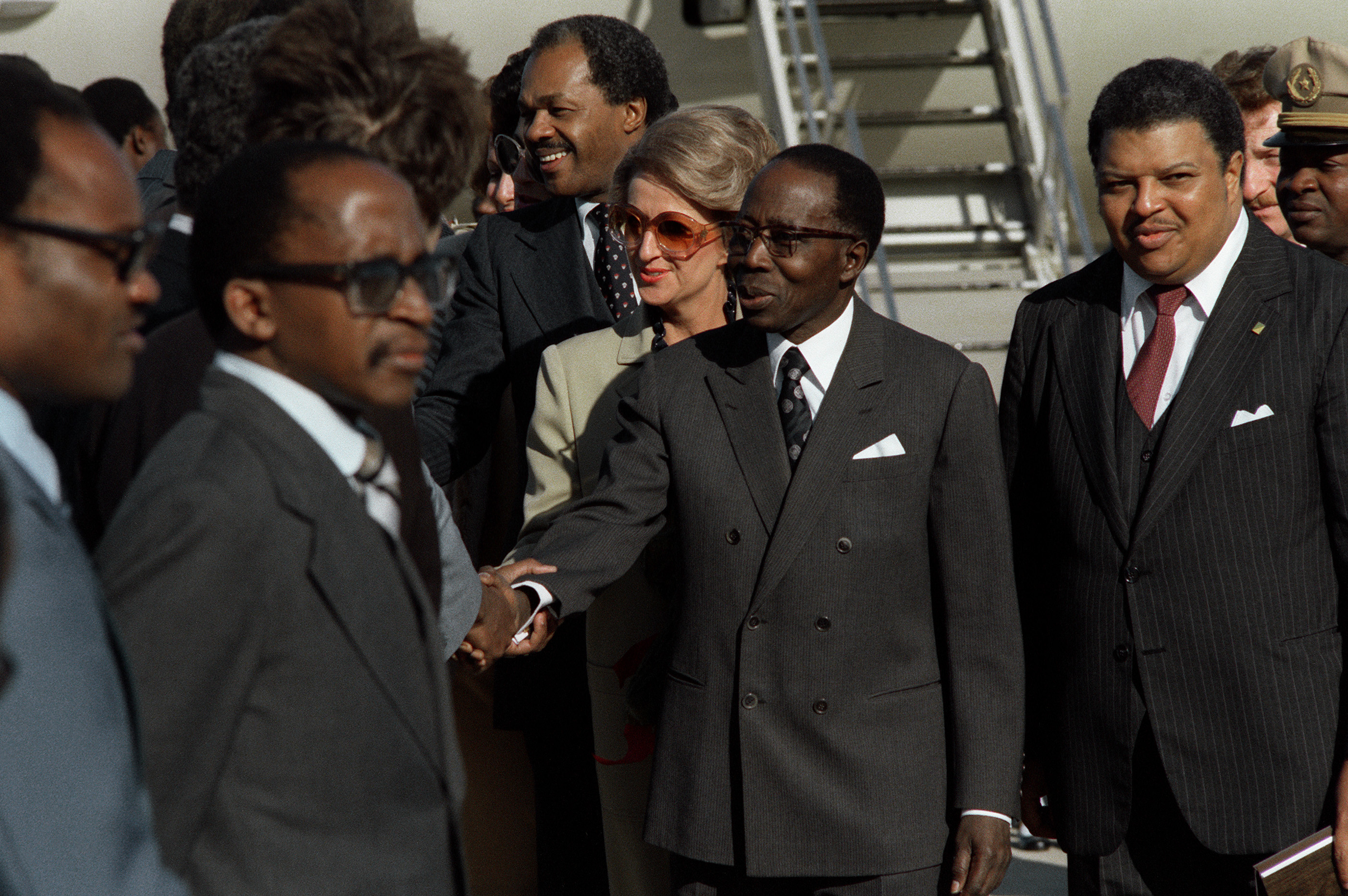

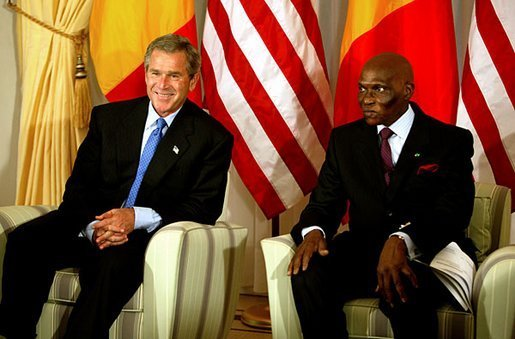

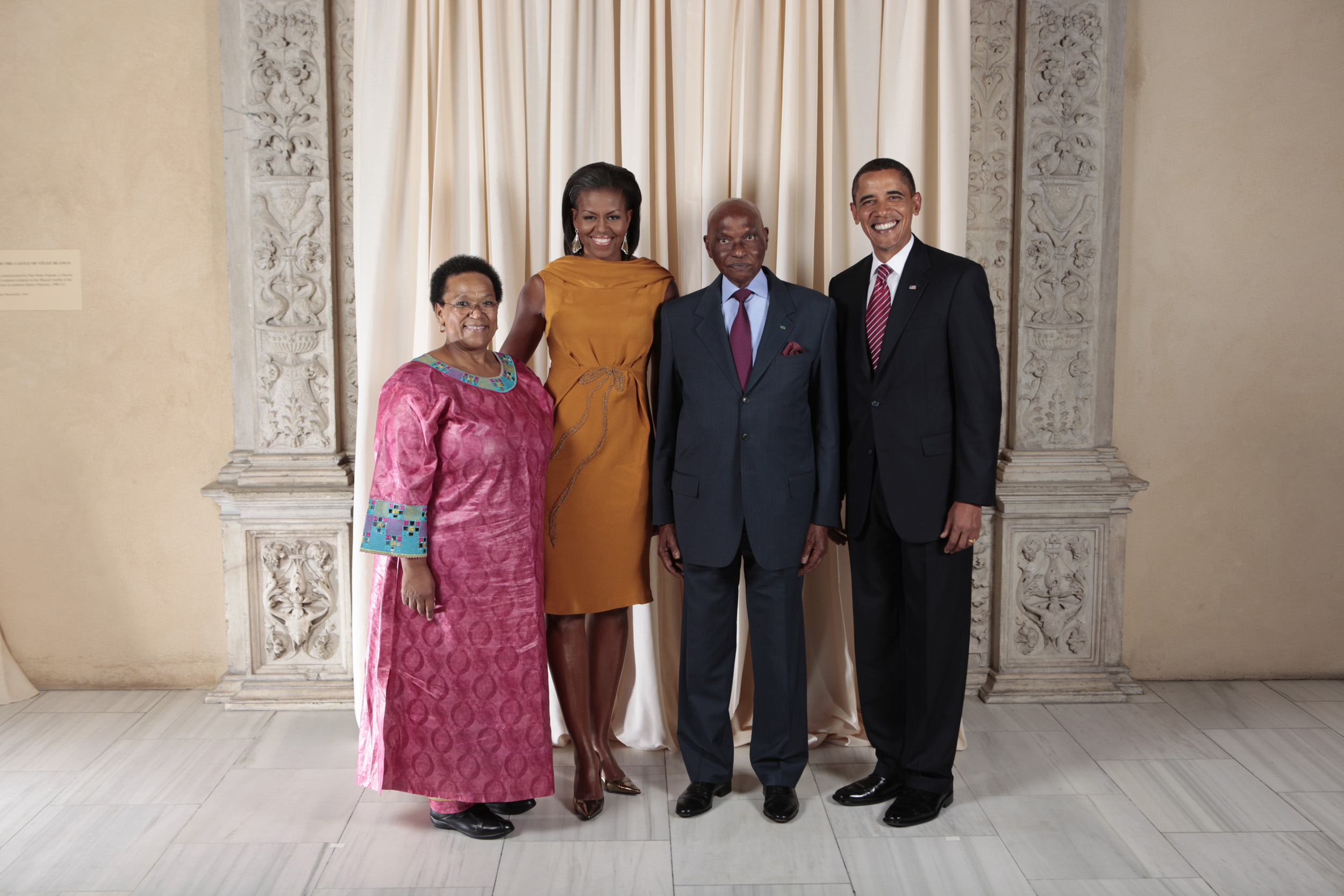

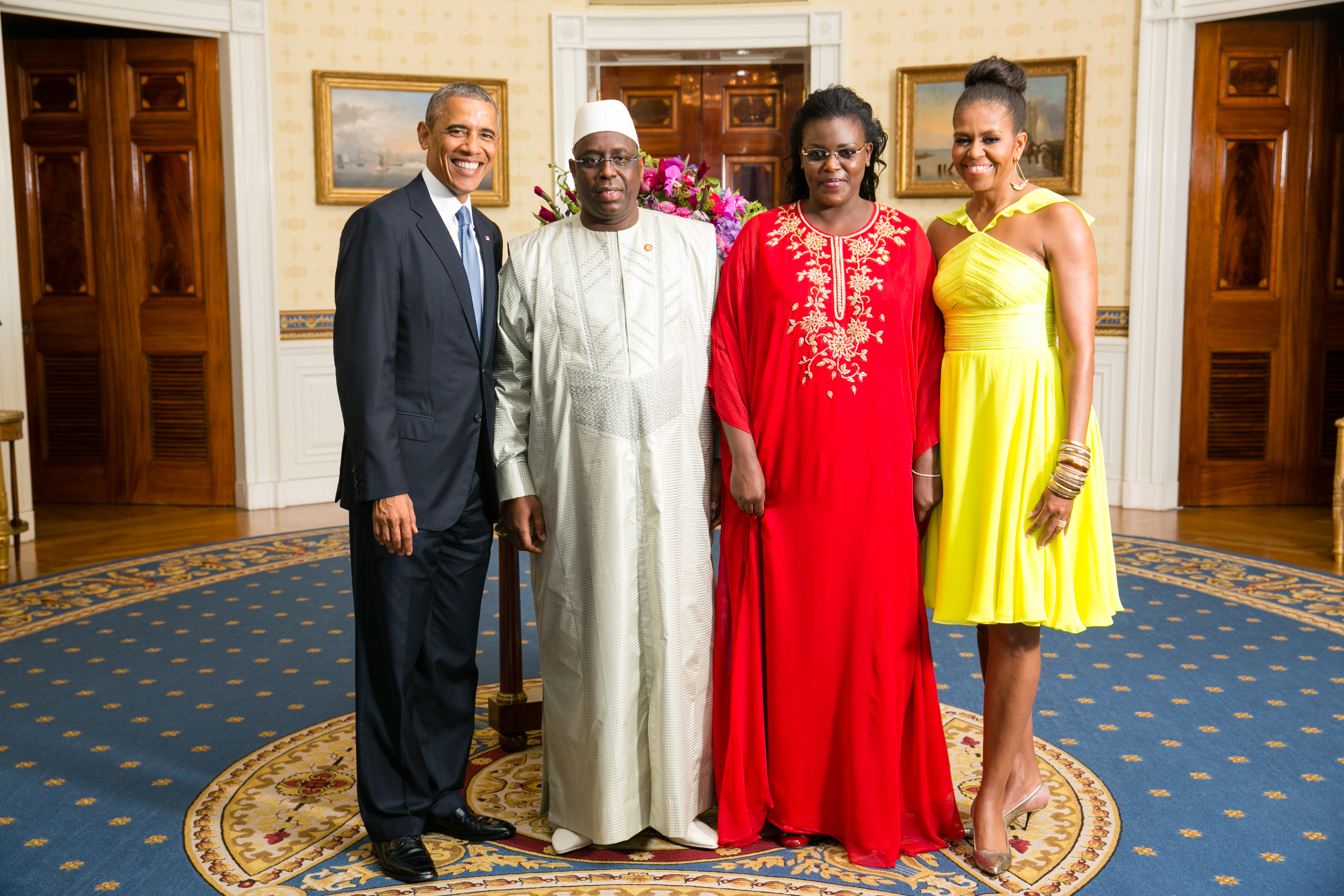

== Sierra Leone ==
Table of Trips
Start	End	Guest	Title	Reason
May 19, 1969	May 19, 1969	Siaka Stevens	Prime Minister	Official visit.
September 25, 1980	September 25, 1980	Siaka Stevens	President	Private visit.
March 28, 2013	March 28, 2013	Ernest Koroma	President	Attended African Leaders Summit
April 15, 2015	April 15, 2015	Ernest Koroma	President	Attended the Africa Leaders Ebola Meeting.

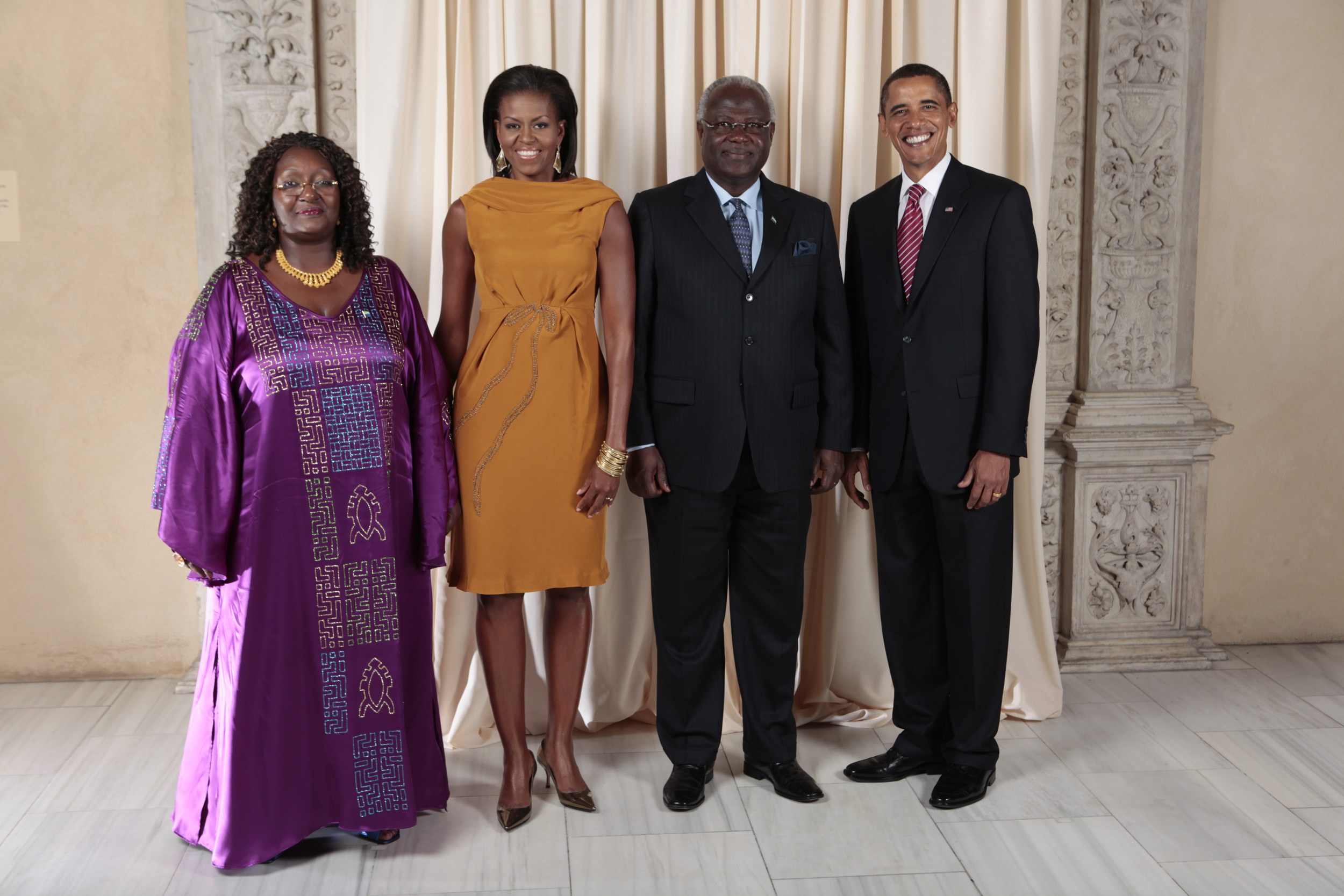

== Somalia ==
Table of Trips
Start	End	Guest	Title	Reason
November 27, 1962	November 29, 1962	Abdirashid Ali Shermarke	Prime Minister	Presidential guest.In U.S.November 25 – December 2, visiting New York City, Philadelphia, and San Juan.
March 14, 1968	March 16, 1968	Ibrahim Egal	Prime Minister	Official visit.In U.S.March 13–21; visited New York City, Knoxville, Cape Kennedy, and Syracuse
October 6, 1969	October 6, 1969	Ibrahim Egal	Prime Minister	Private visit.
October 11, 1974	October 11, 1974	Siad Barre	President	Private visit.
March 9, 1982	March 14, 1982	Siad Barre	President	Official working visit.Private visit afterward to Houston, Chicago, and New York City

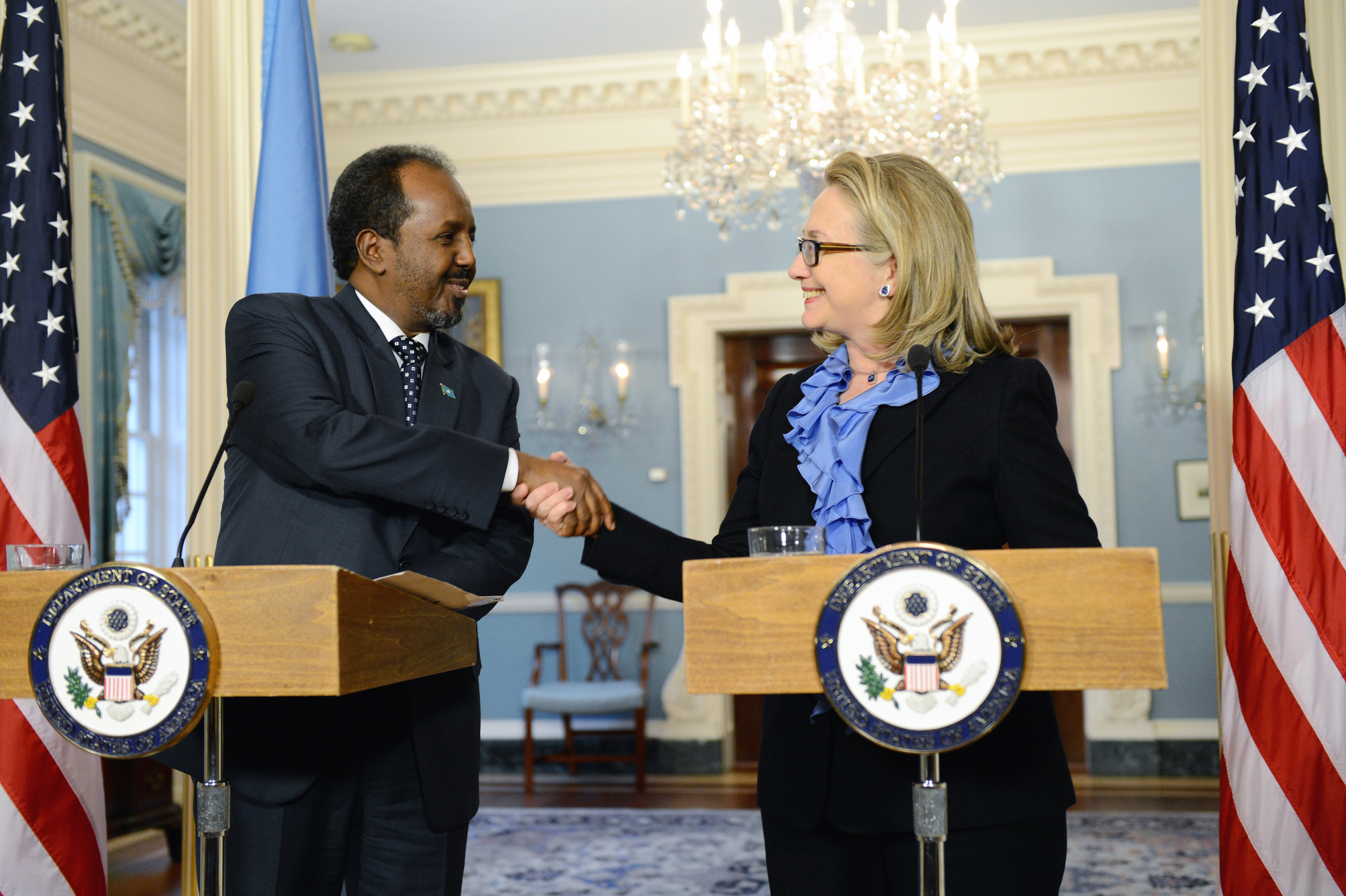

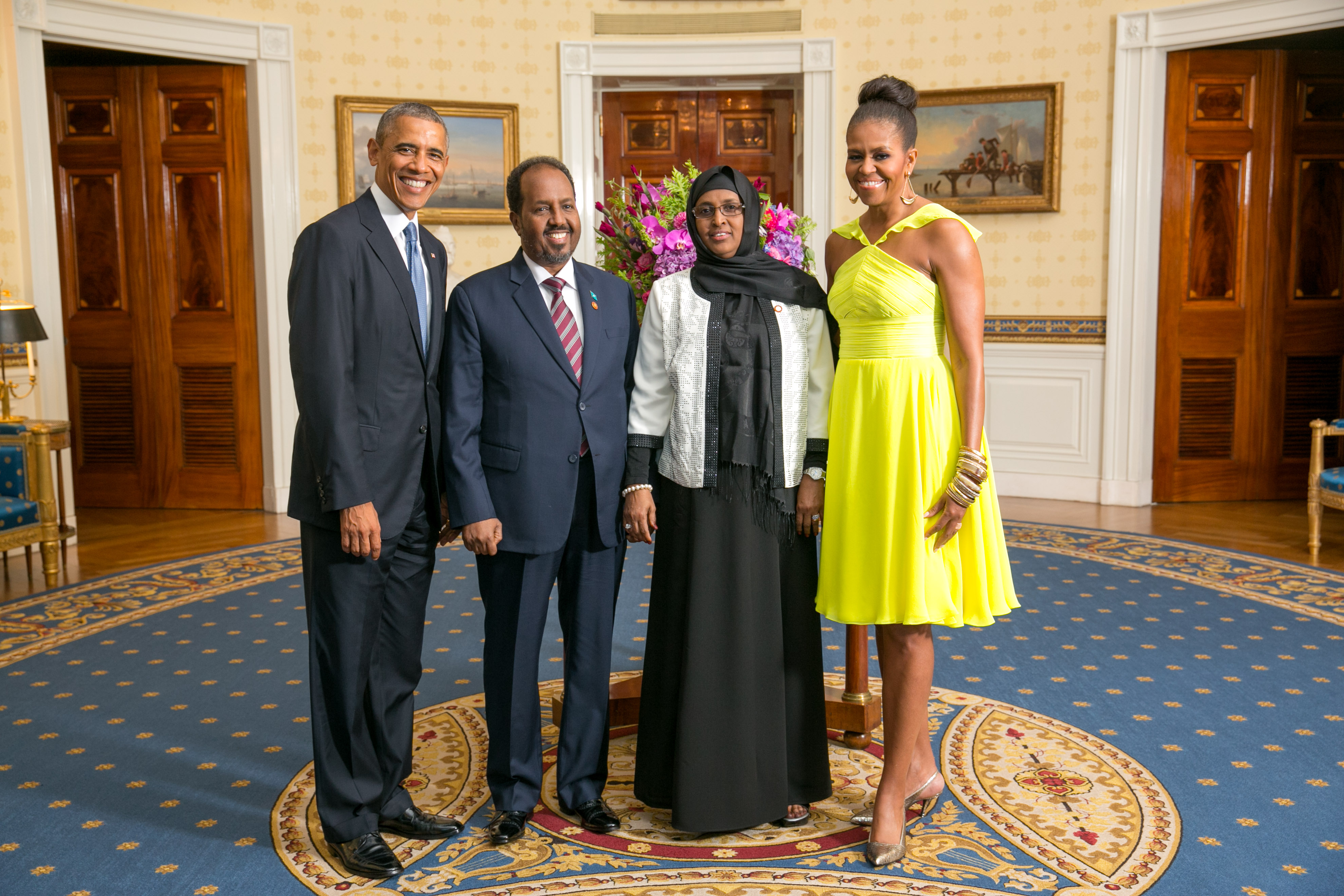

== South Africa ==
Table of trips
Dates	Guest	Title	Reason
April 18 – June 26, 1945	Jan Smuts	Prime Minister	Led South African delegation to the United Nations Conference in San Francisco.
October 22 – December 8, 1946	Jan Smuts	Prime Minister	Led South African delegation to the United Nations General Assembly. In U.S.October 22 – December 8.
September 23–25, 1990	Frederik Willem de Klerk	State President	Official working visit
June 30 – July 5, 1993	Frederik Willem de Klerk	State President	Met with President Clinton during a private visit. Received the Liberty Medal in Philadelphia.
October 2–7, 1994	Nelson Mandela	President	State visit; also visited New York City and addressed the U.N. General Assembly. Addressed joint meeting of U.S. Congress.
September 21–23, 1998	Nelson Mandela	President	Working visit
September 21, 1998	Thabo Mbeki	President	Met with President Clinton during the U.N. General Assembly in New York City.
May 22–25, 2000	Thabo Mbeki	President	State visit; afterwards visited Austin, Texas.
June 25–27, 2001	Thabo Mbeki	President	Working visit
November 11, 2001	Thabo Mbeki	President	Met with President Bush at the U.N. General Assembly in New York City.
September 13, 2002	Thabo Mbeki	President	Met with President Bush at the U.N. General Assembly in New York City.
July 10–11, 2004	Thabo Mbeki	President	Met with President Bush at the G8 summit in Sea Island, Georgia. Attended the funeral for former President Ronald Reagan.
June 1, 2005	Thabo Mbeki	President	Working visit
December 7–8, 2006	Thabo Mbeki	President	Working visit
November 14–15, 2008	Kgalema Motlanthe	President	Attended the G20 summit meeting in Washington, D.C..
September 22–25, 2009	Jacob Zuma	President	Attended the G20 summit meeting in Pittsburgh.
April 12–13, 2010	Jacob Zuma	President	Attended the Nuclear Security Summit.
August 4–6, 2014	Jacob Zuma	President	Attended the United States–Africa Leaders Summit.
September 16, 2018	Cyril Ramaphosa	President	Working Visit.

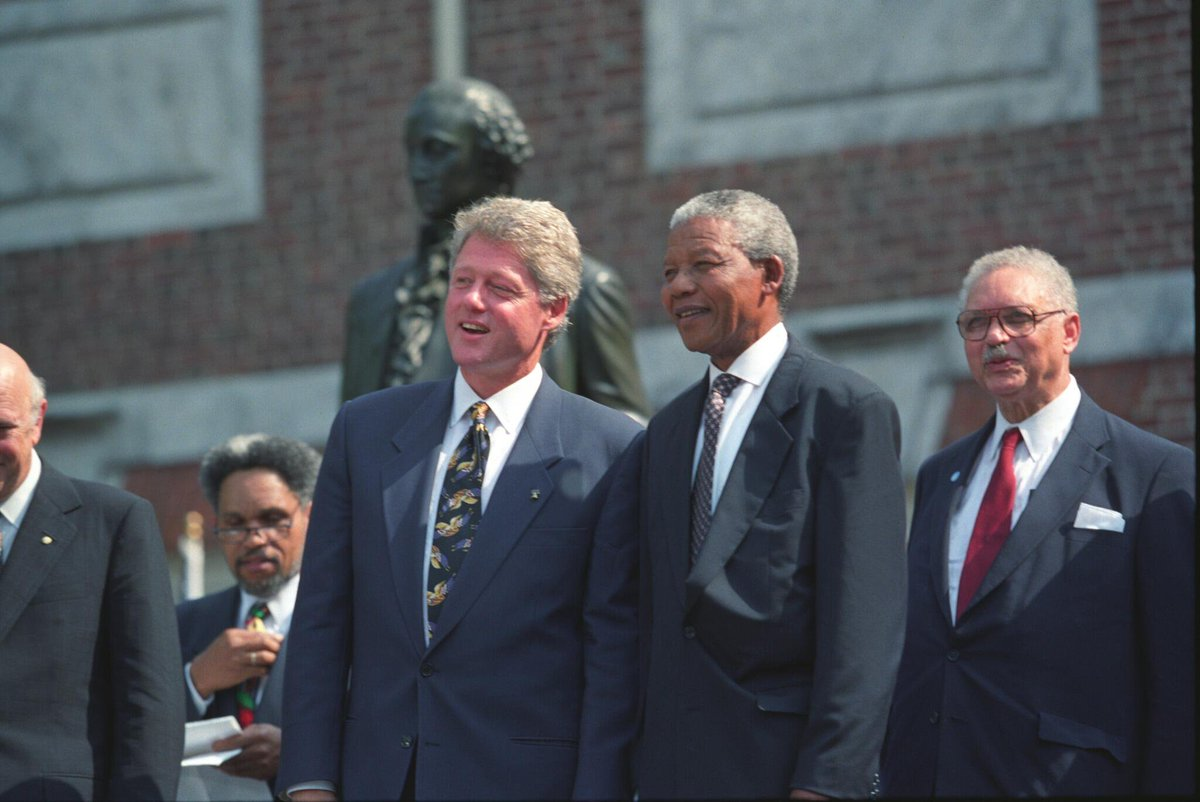

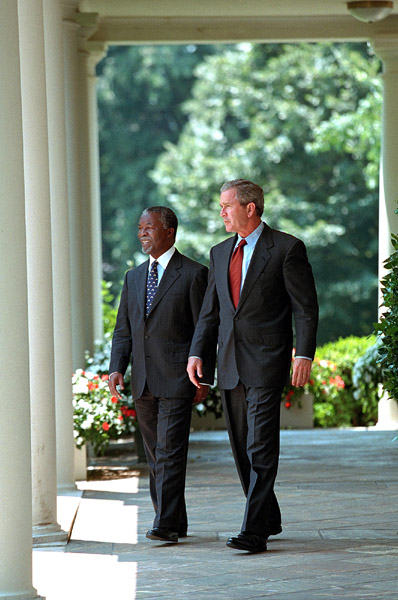

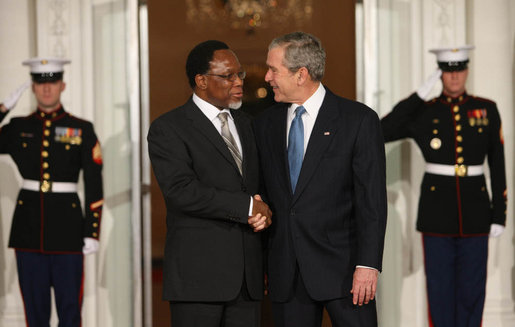

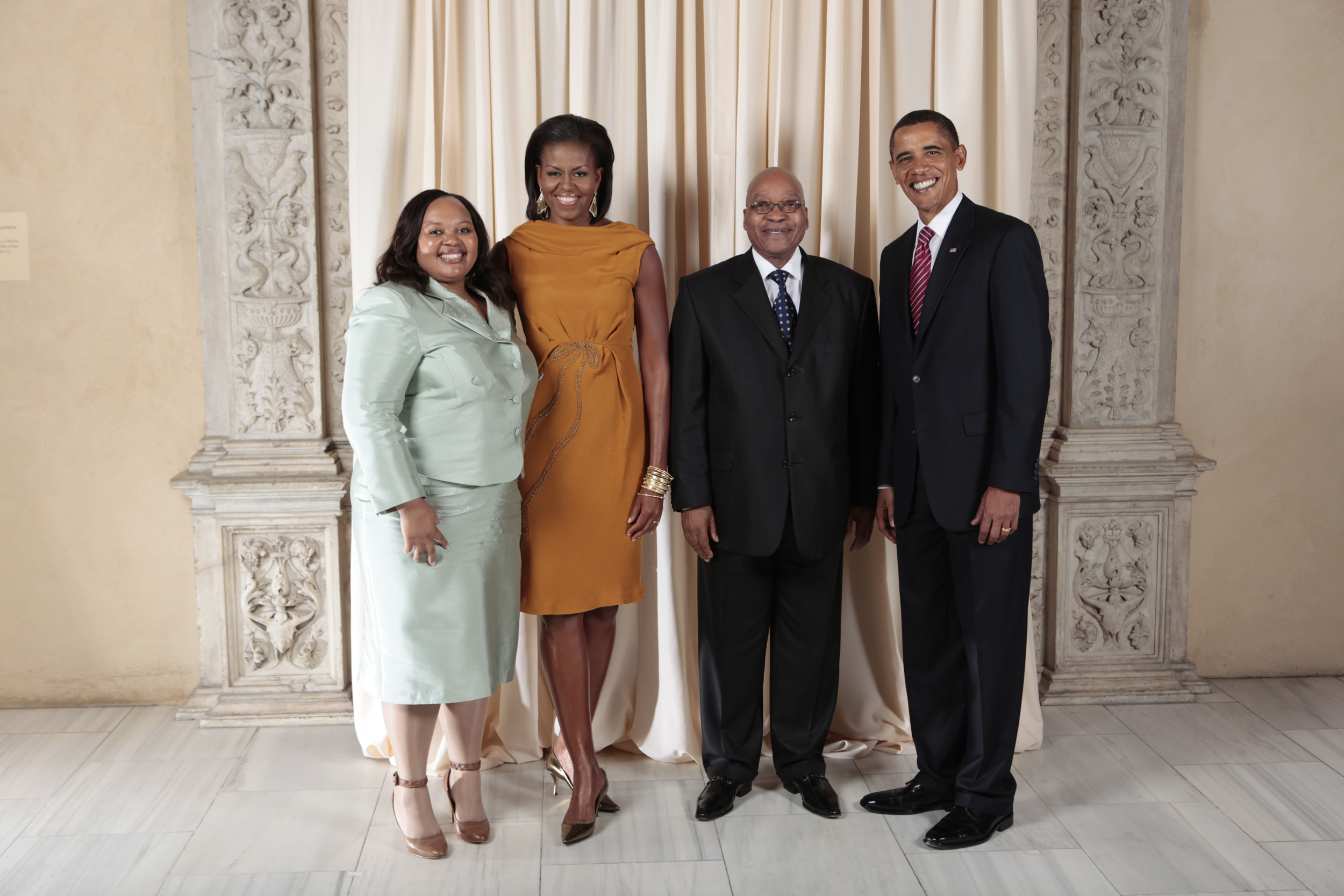

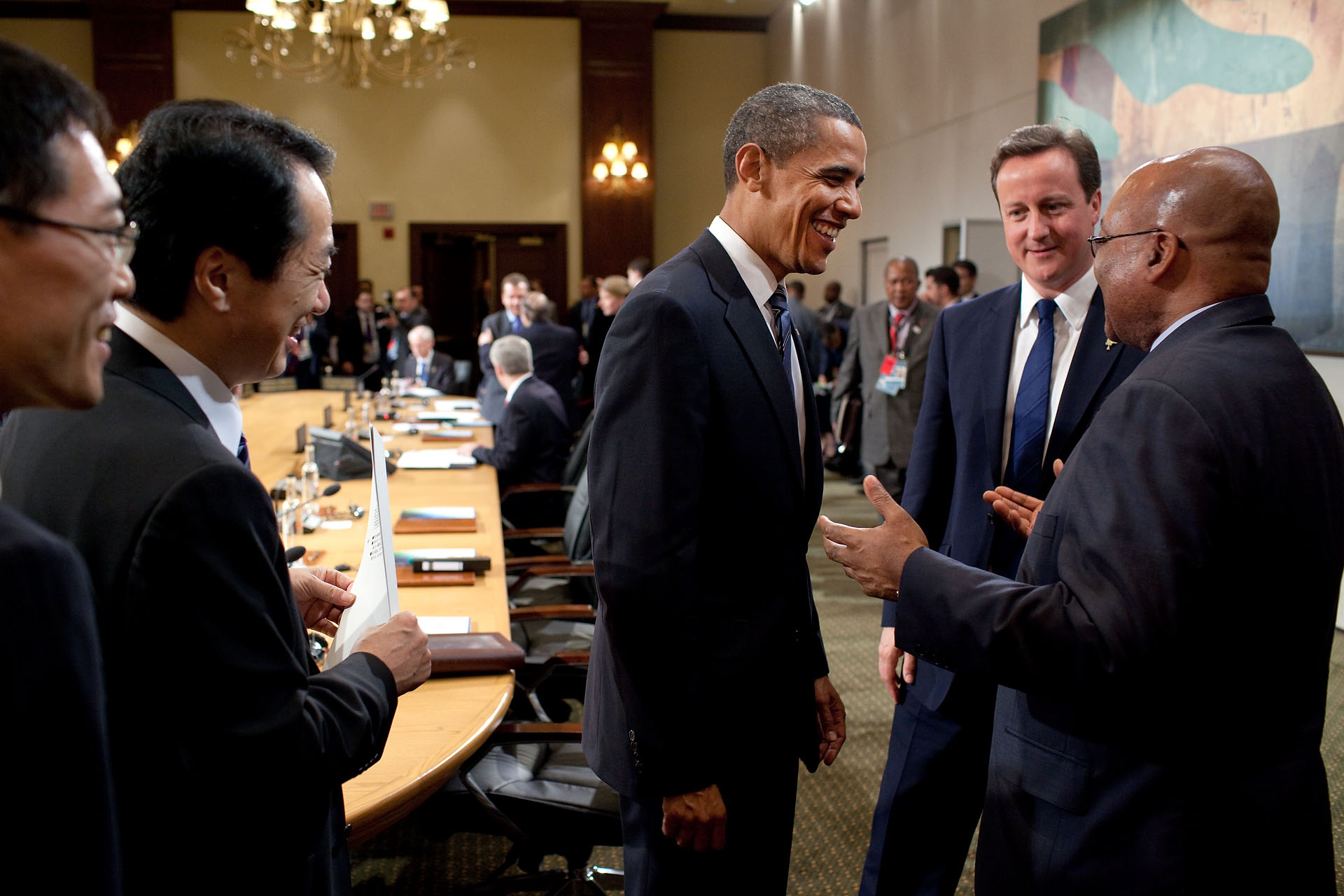

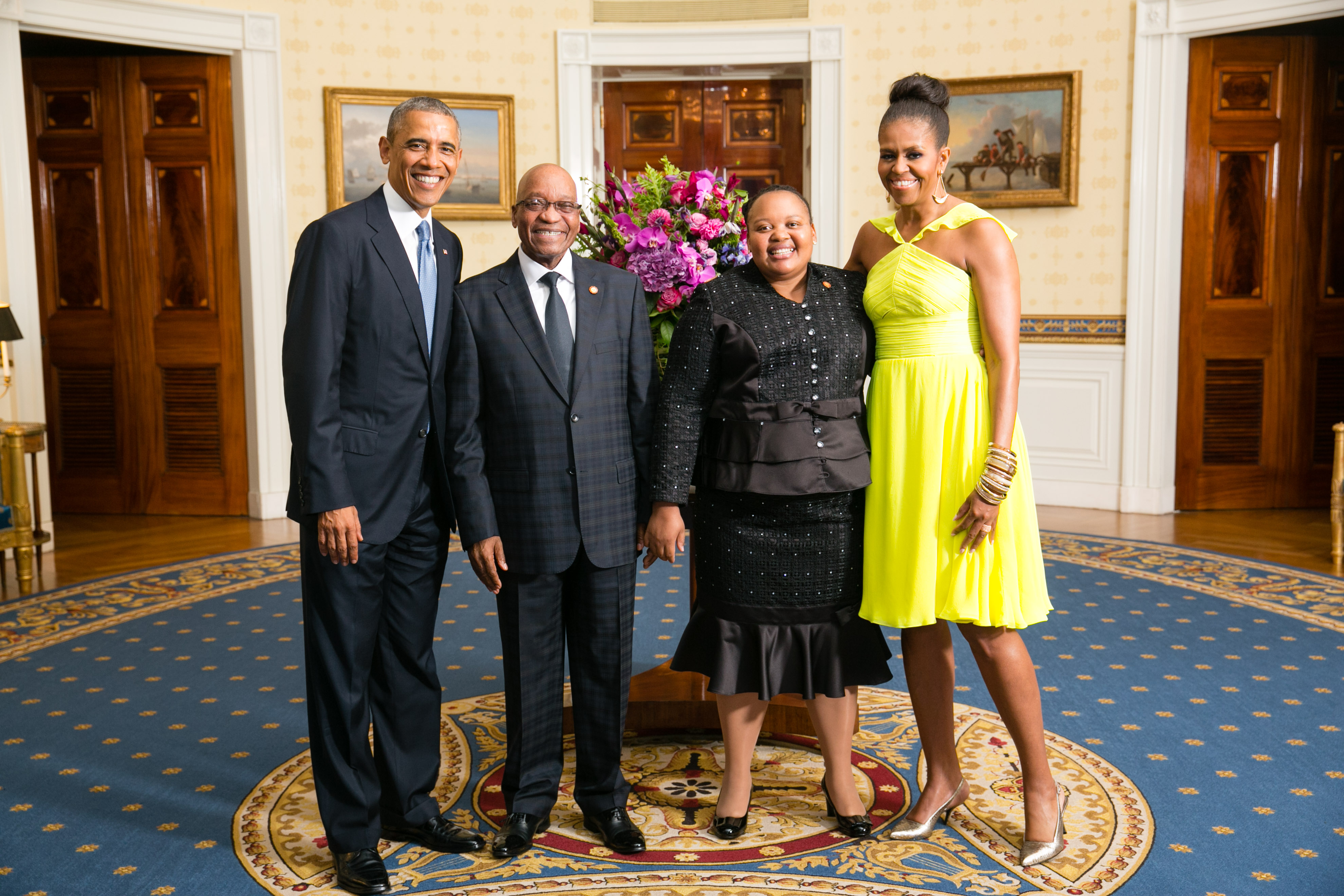

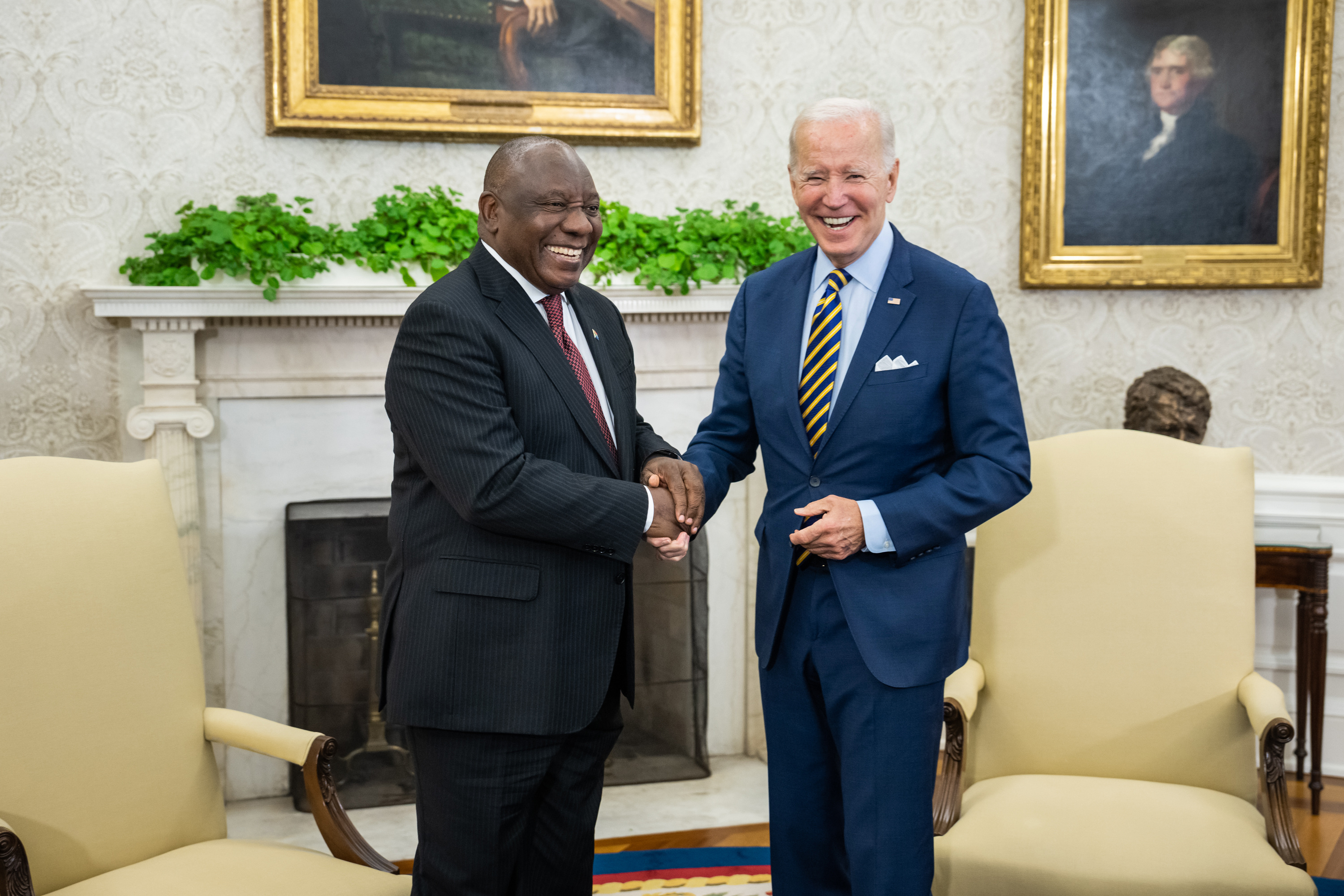

== South Sudan ==
Table of Trips
Start	End	Guest	Title	Reason
September 21, 2011	September 21, 2011	Salva Kiir	President	Met with President Obama at the UN General Assembly in New York City.

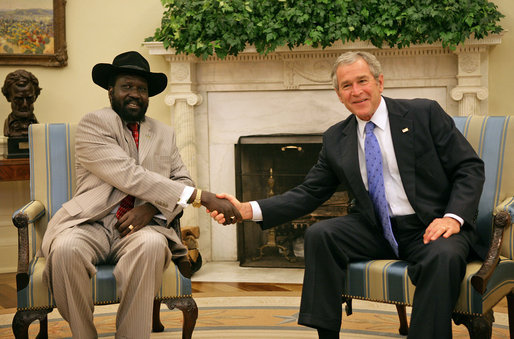

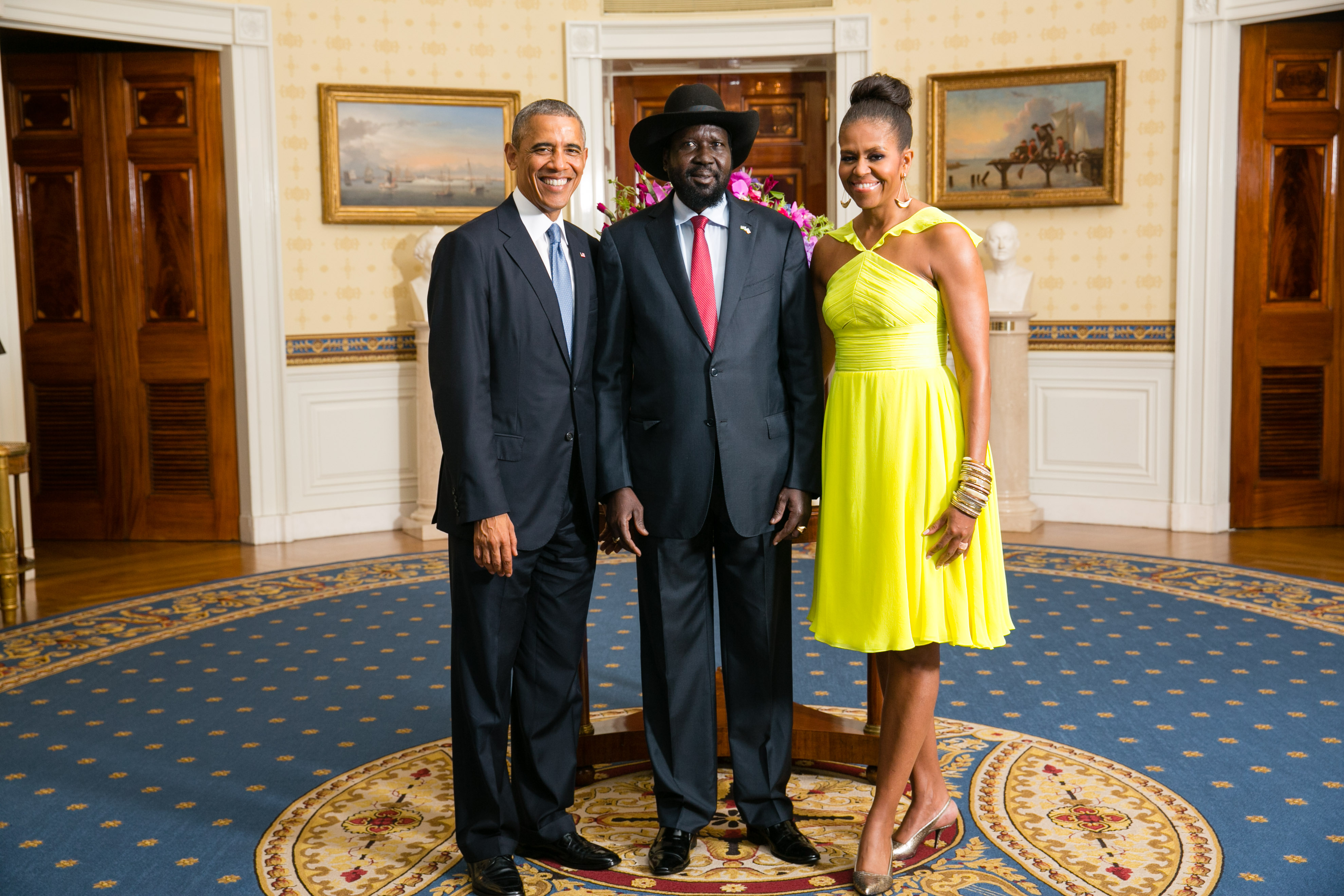

== Sudan ==
Table of Trips
Start	End	Guest	Title	Reason
October 4, 1961	October 7, 1961	Ibrahim Abboud	President	State visit.Afterwards visited Los Angeles, Fresno, San Francisco, Chicago, and New York City.Departed U.S.October 15.
June 10, 1976	June 10, 1976	Jaafar Nimeiry	President	Private visit.
September 21, 1978	September 21, 1978	Jaafar Nimeiry	President	Private visit.
June 27, 1980	July 2, 1980	Jaafar Nimeiry	President	Private visit.Met with President Carter July 2.
November 14, 1981	November 21, 1981	Jaafar Nimeiry	President	Private visit.Met with President Reagan November 20
November 19, 1983	November 22, 1983	Jaafar Nimeiry	President	Official working visit.Private visit afterward.Departed U.S.December 1.
March 27, 1985	April 5, 1985	Jaafar Nimeiry	President	Private Visit.Met with President Reagan April 1.

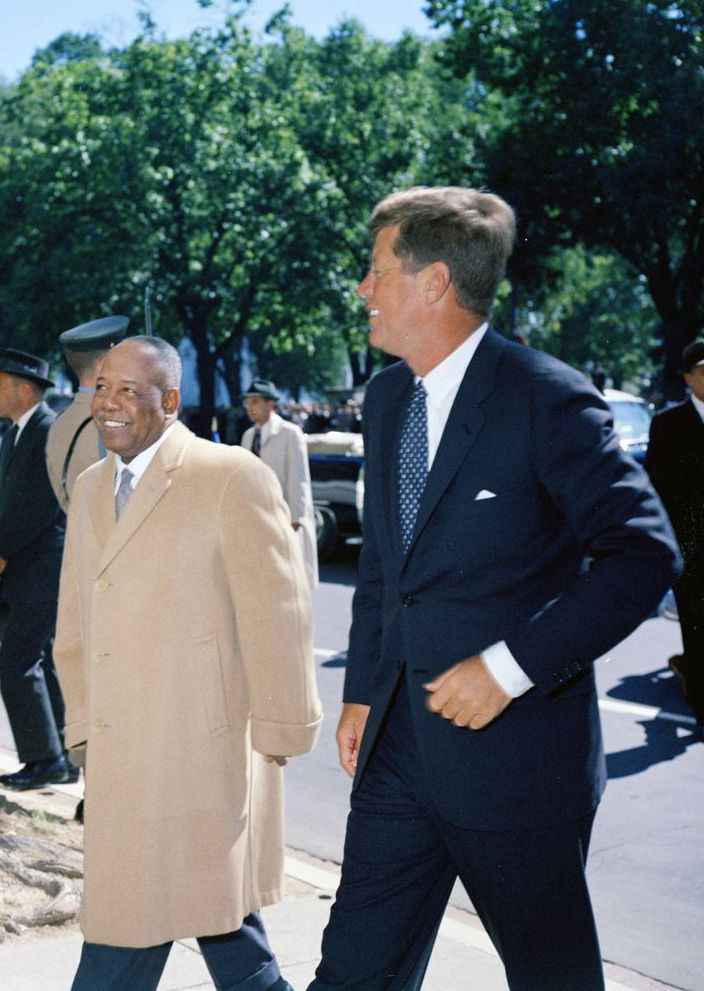

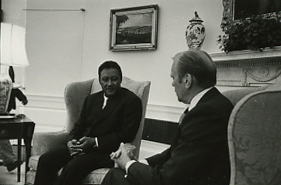

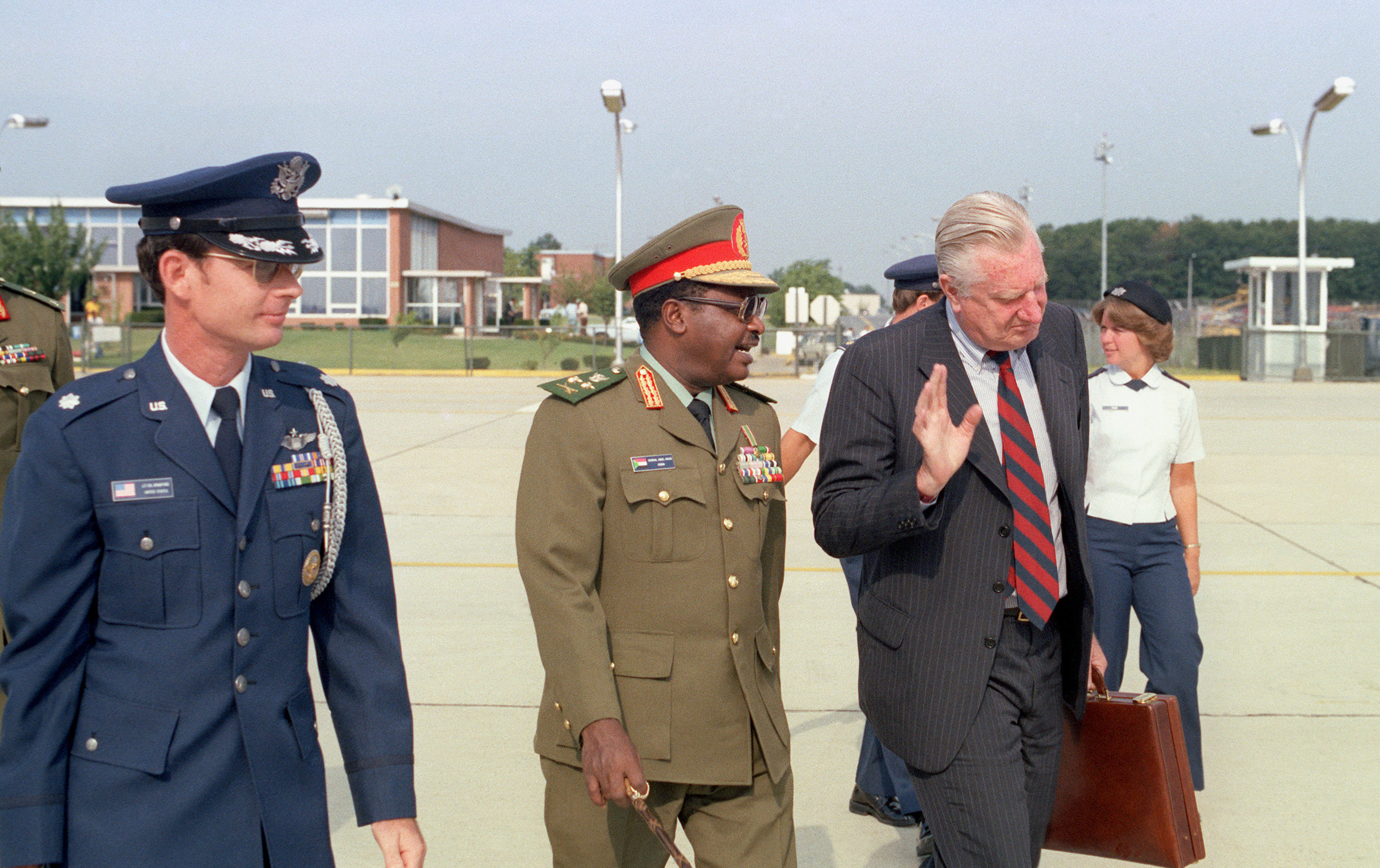

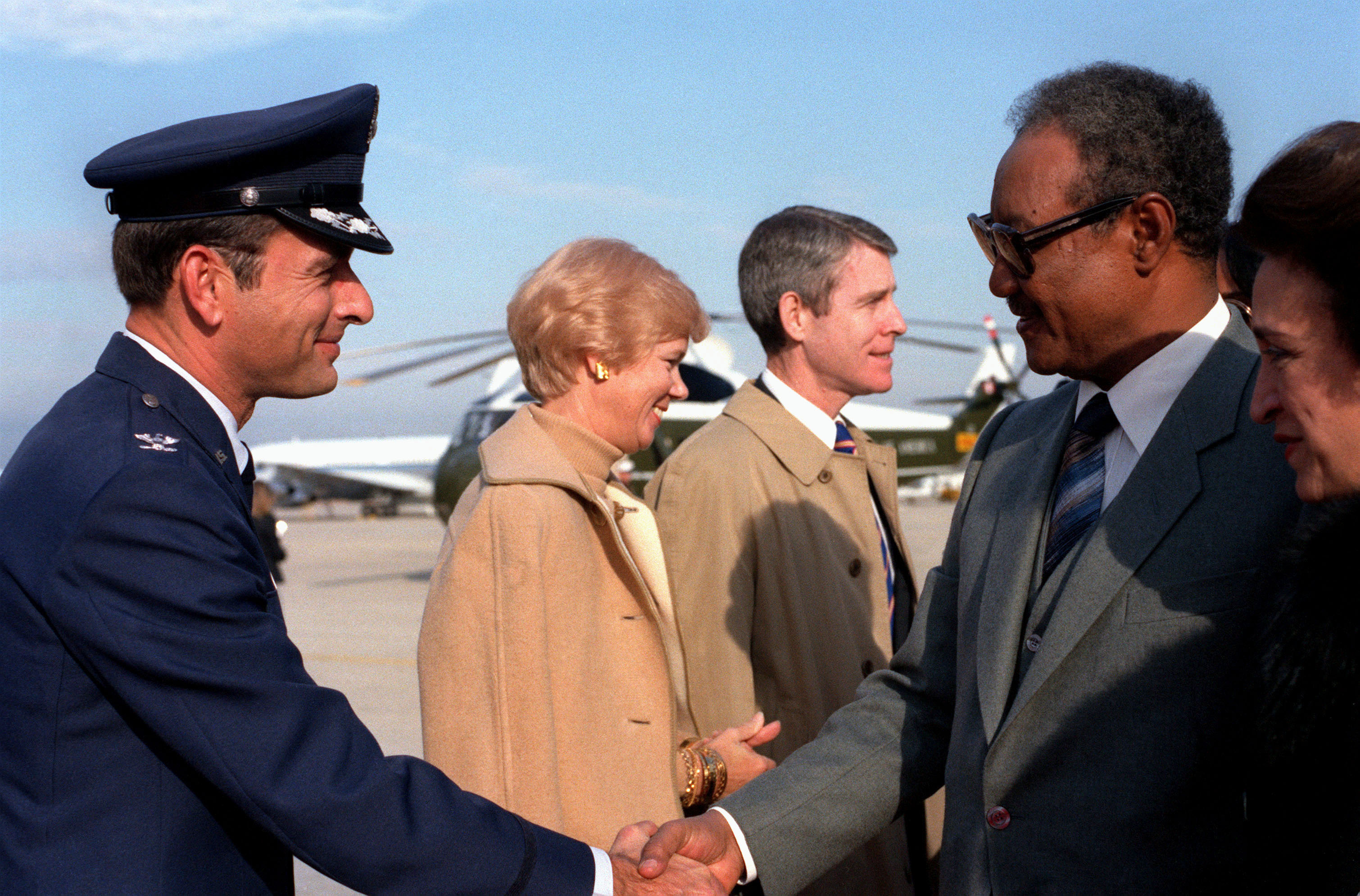

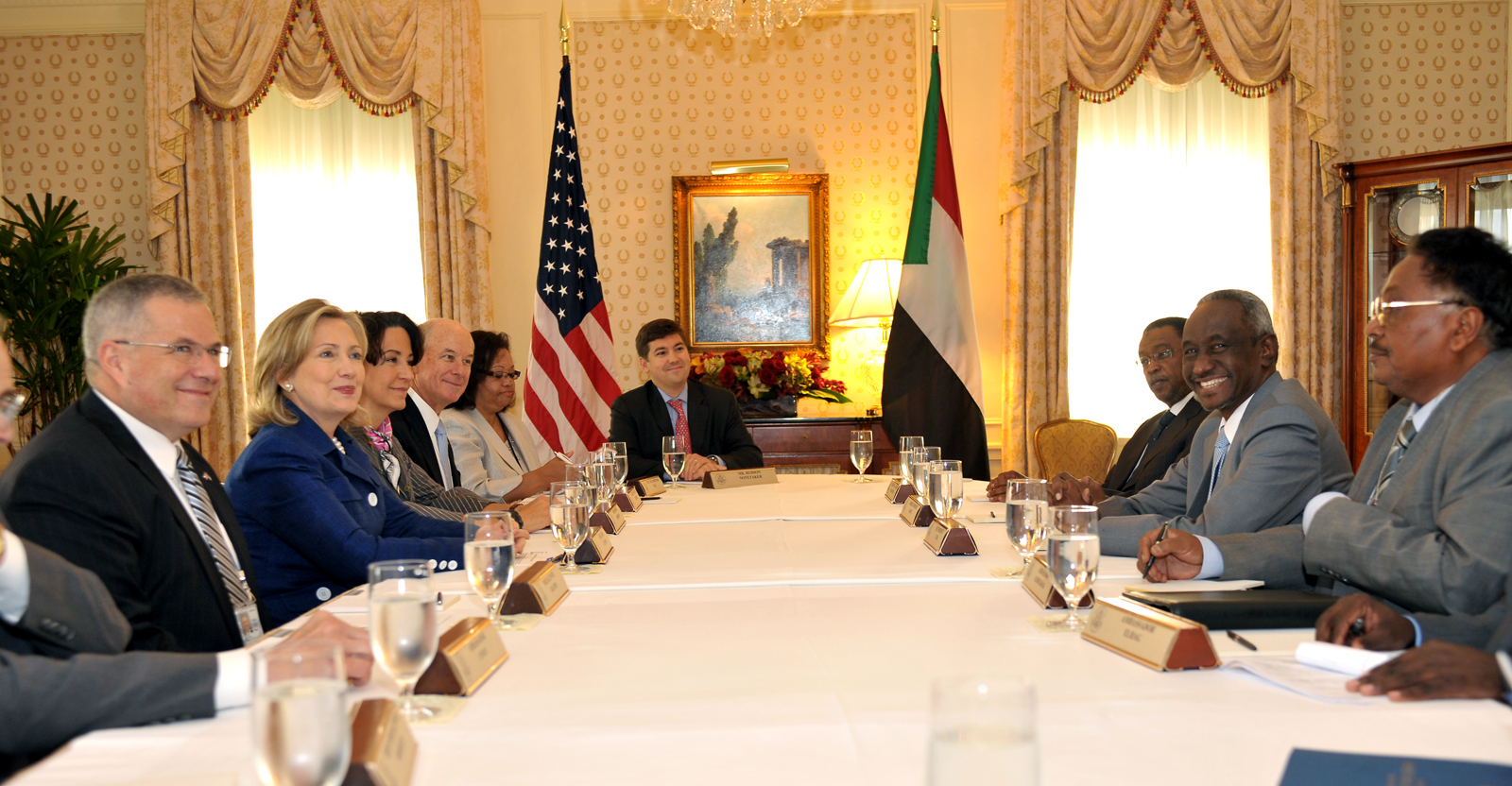

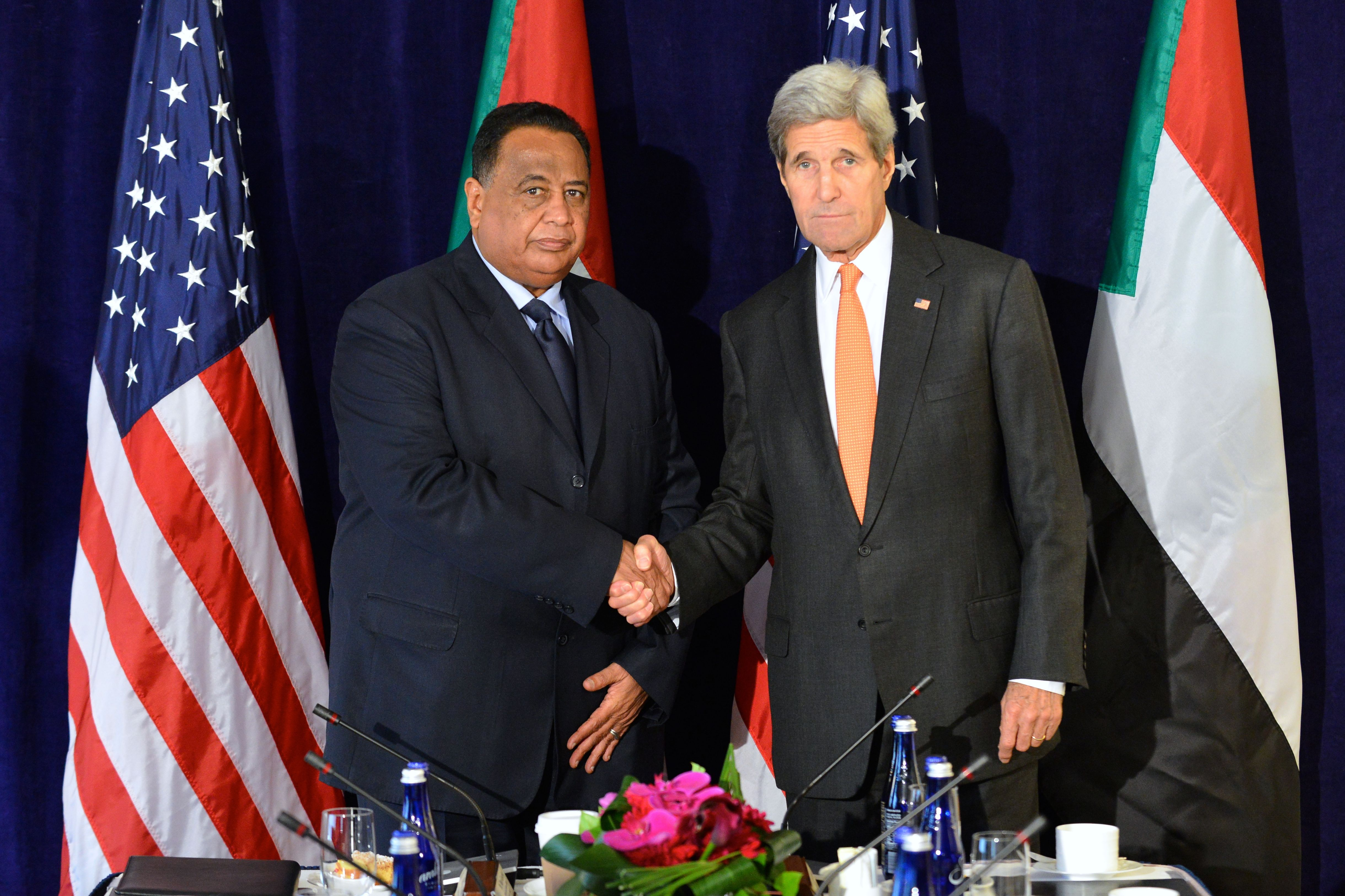

== Swaziland ==
Table of Trips
Start	End	Guest	Title	Reason
September 18, 1968	September 18, 1968	Makhosini Dlamini	Prime Minister	Informal visit.
October 19, 1995	October 19, 1995	Mswati III	King	Attended Africare dinner with President Clinton
June 21, 2003	June 26, 2003	Mswati III	King	Attended United States-Africa Business Summit; met with President Bush during a private visit June 26.
August 5, 2014	August 6, 2014	Mswati III	King	Attended the U.S.-Africa Leaders Summit.

== Tanzania ==
Table of Trips
Start	End	Guest	Title	Reason
17.Jul. 1961	17.Jul. 1961	Julius Nyerere	Prime Minister	Informal visit after attending UN Trusteeship Council meeting.
July 15, 1963	July 17, 1963	Julius Nyerere	President	Official visit. In U.S. July 14–20, visited Boston and New York City.
August 3, 1977	August 5, 1977	Julius Nyerere	President	State visit. Afterwards visited Sioux City, San Francisco, Los Angeles, Nashville, and Atlanta. Departed U.S. August 10.
21.Se.1999	September 21, 1999	Benjamin Mkapa	President	Met with President Clinton at the United Nations General Assembly in New York City.
September 18, 2006	September 18, 2006	Jakaya Kikwete	President	Met with President Bush at the United Nations General Assembly in New York City.
August 26, 2008	August 31, 2008	Jakaya Kikwete	President	Working visit.
September 23, 2008	September 23, 2008	Jakaya Kikwete	President	Met with President Bush at the United Nations General Assembly in New York City.
May 21, 2009	May 21, 2009	Jakaya Kikwete	President	Working Visit.

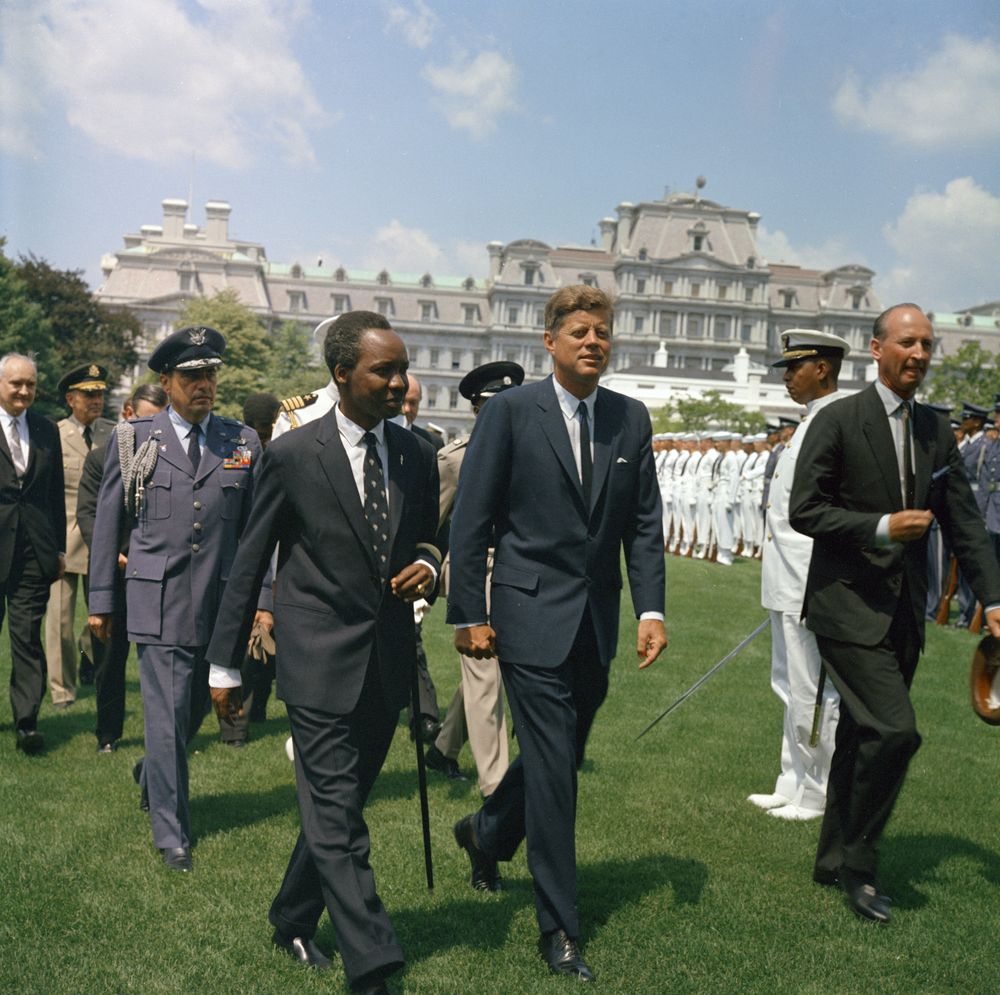

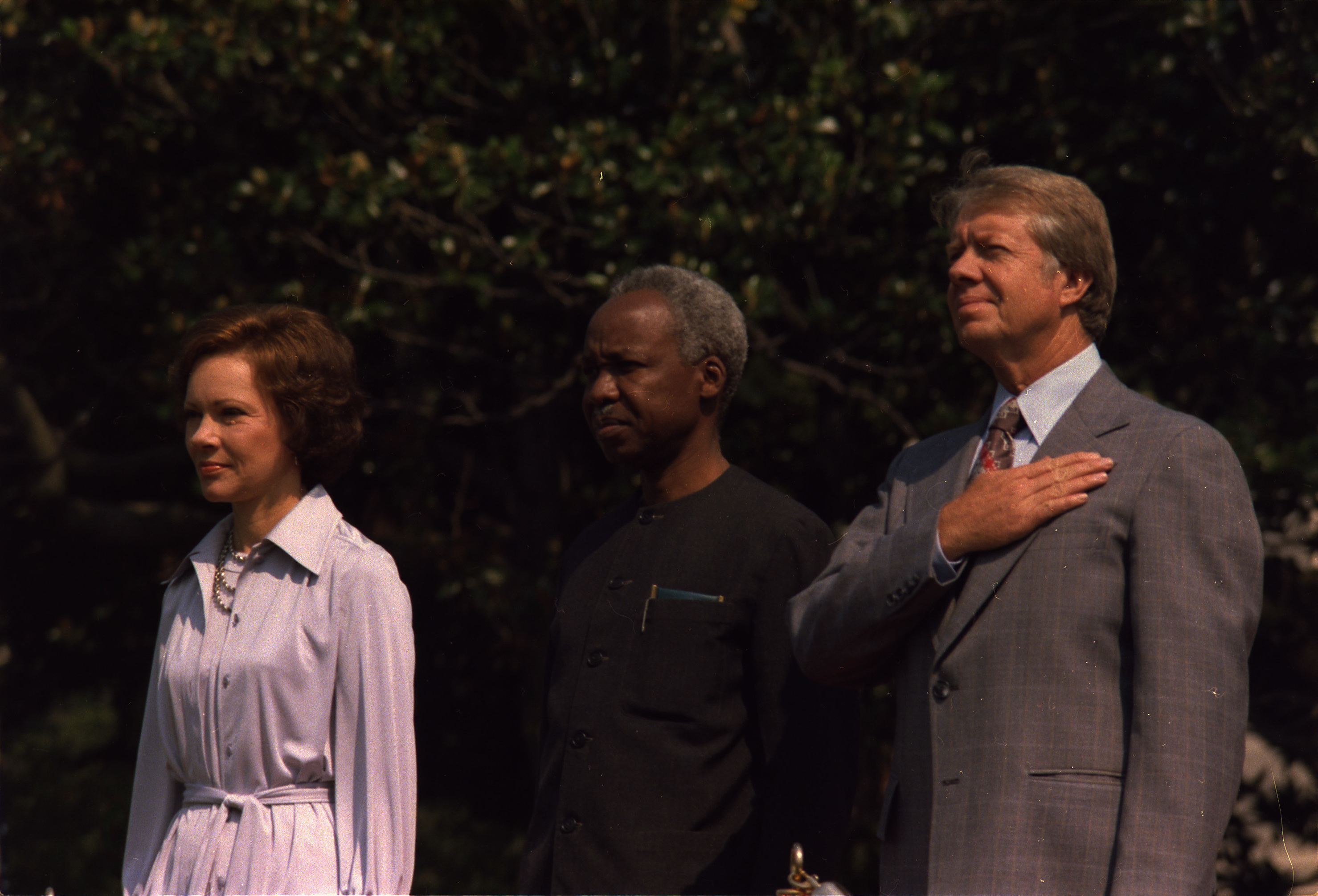

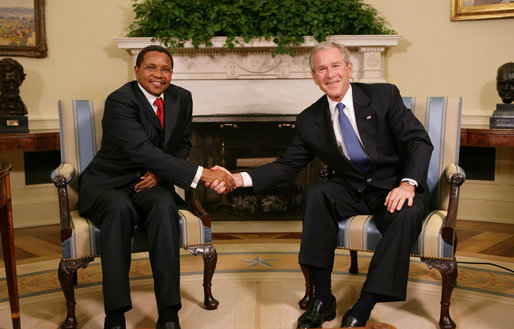

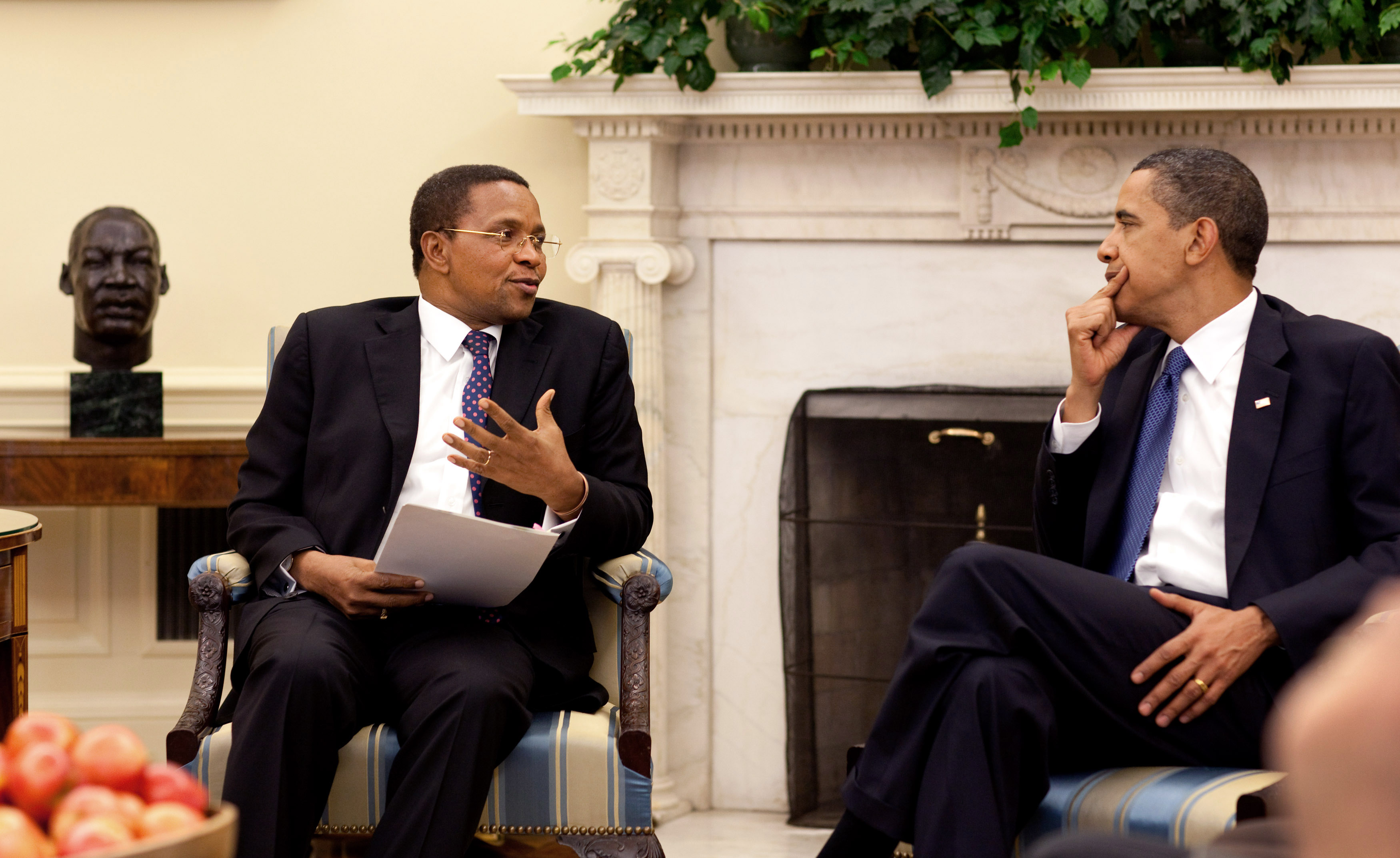

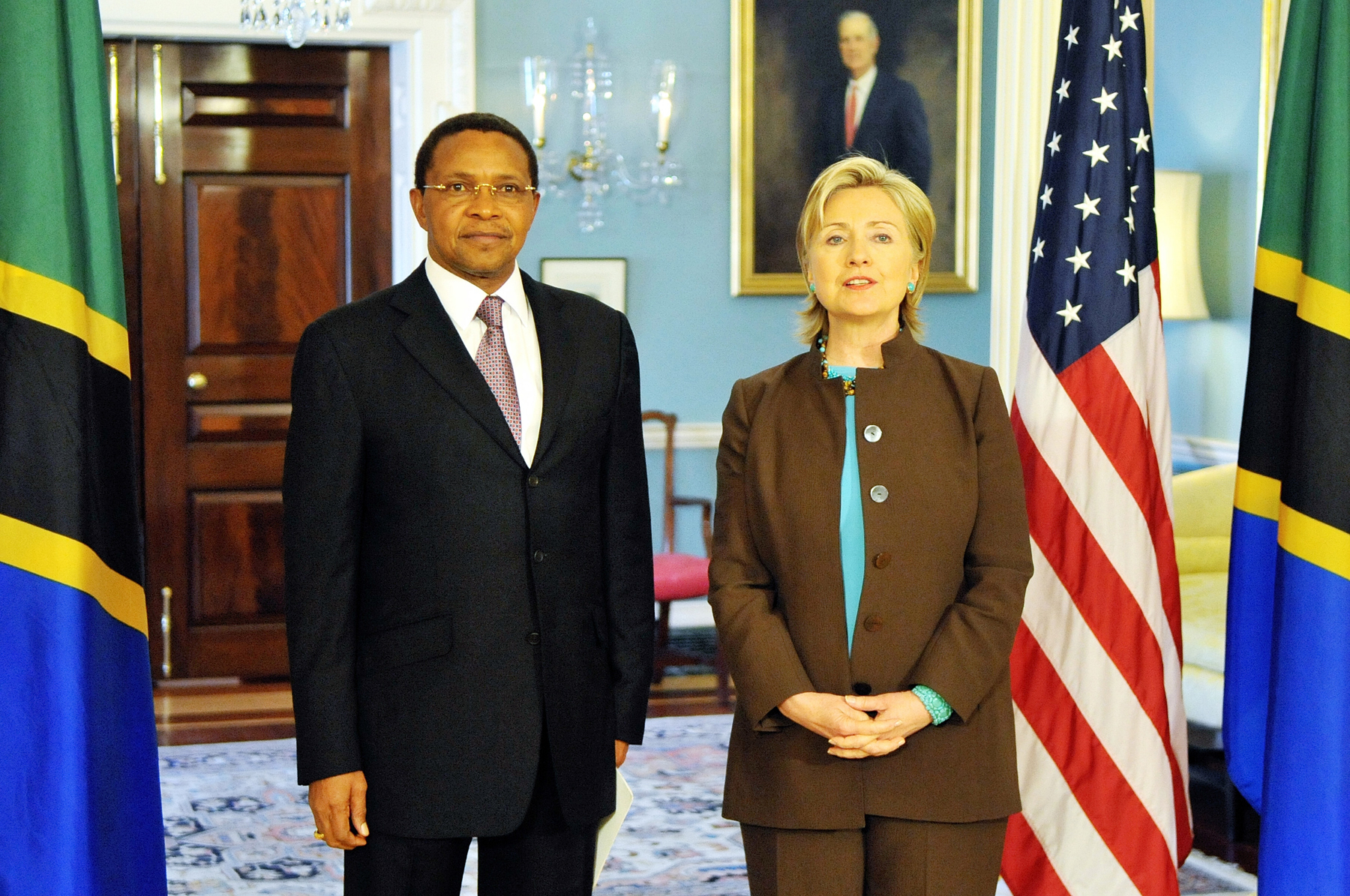

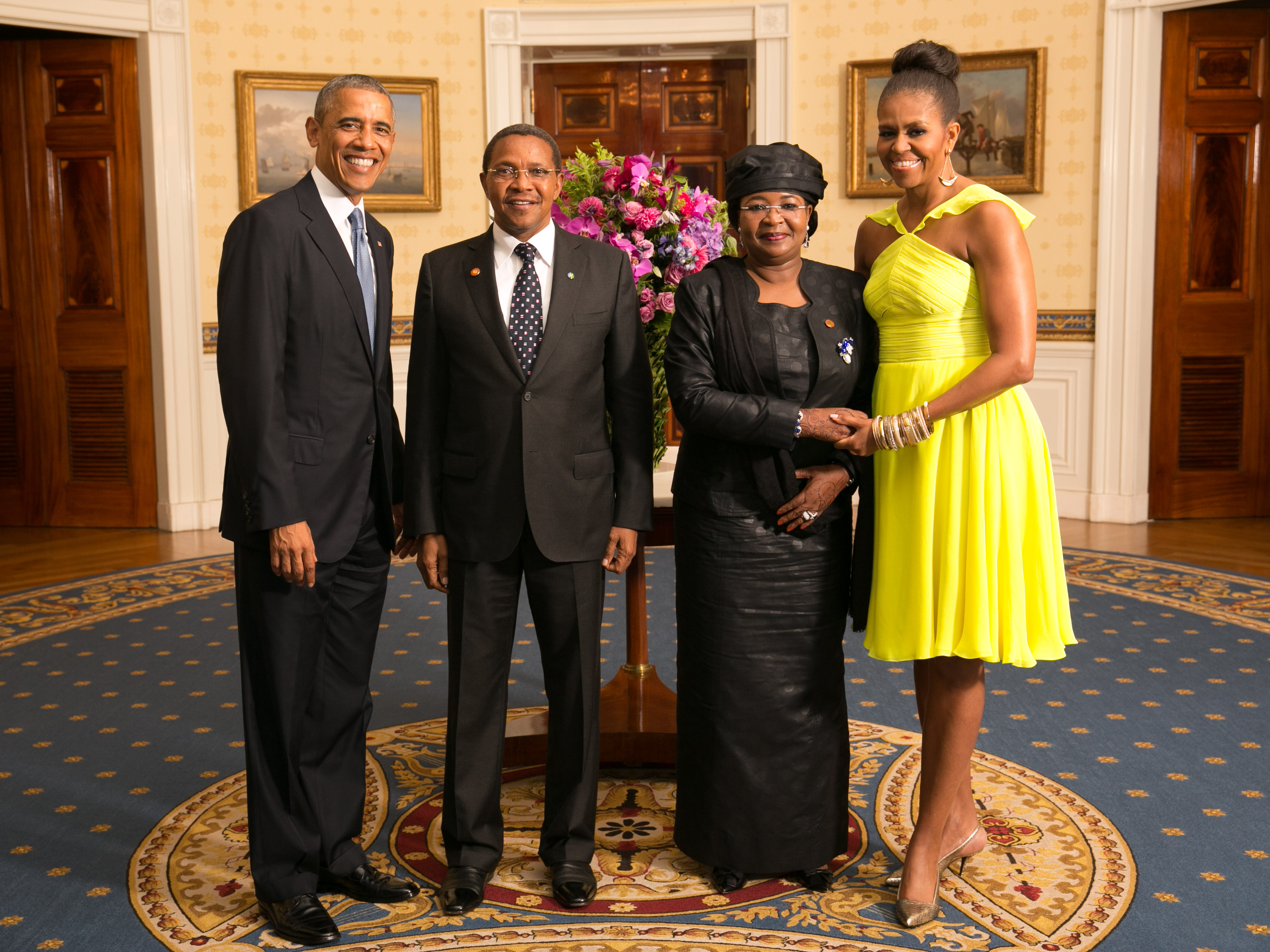

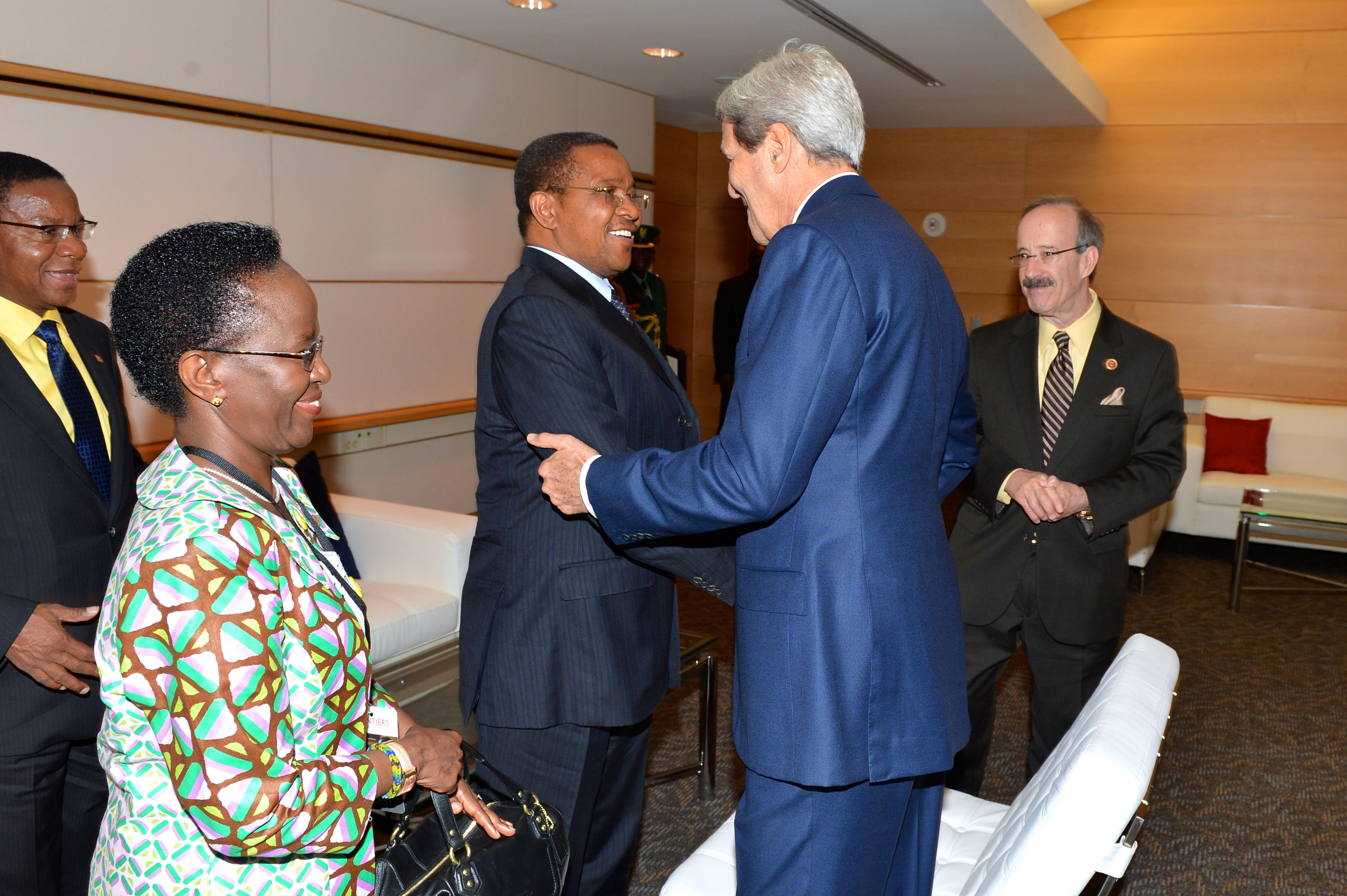

== Togo ==
Table of Trips
Start	End	Guest	Title	Reason
September 23, 1960	September 23, 1960	Sylvanus Olympio	President	Met with President Eisenhower in New York City while attending UN General Assembly session.
March 20, 1962	March 22, 1962	Sylvanus Olympio	President	Presidential guest.In the U.S.March 19–30, visiting New York City, Niagara Falls, and the U.S. Virgin Islands.
October 22, 1983	October 26, 1983	Gnassingbe Eyadema	President	Private visit.Met with President Reagan October 24.
July 30, 1990	August 1, 1990	Gnassingbe Eyadema	President	Official working visit.

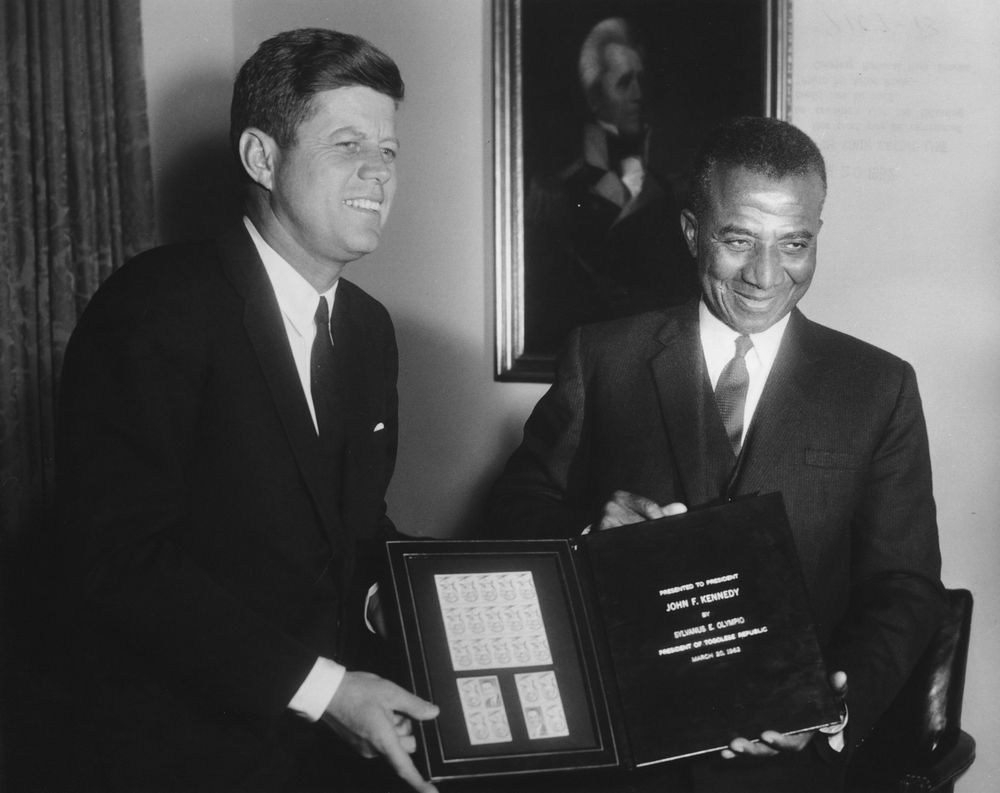

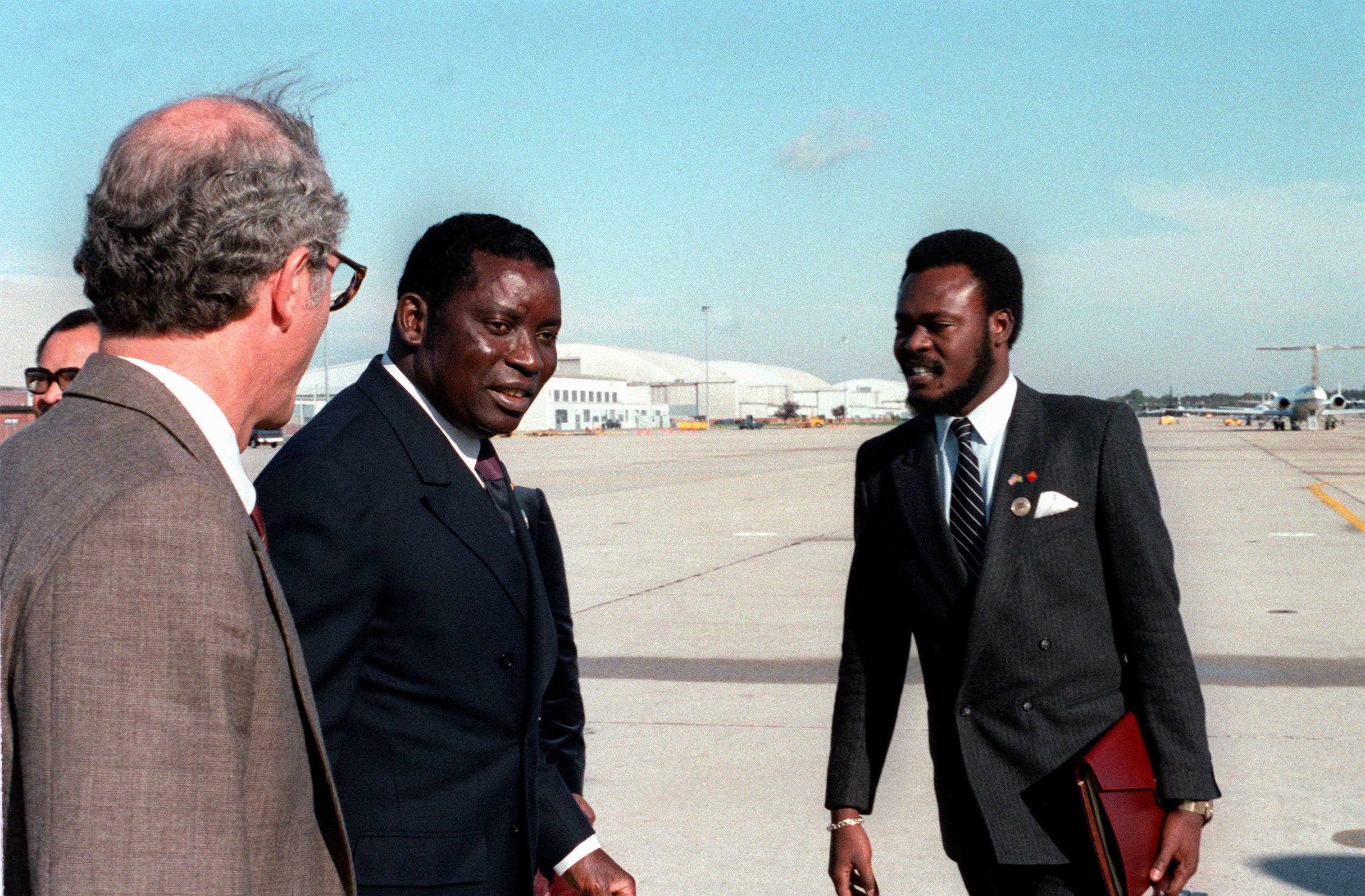

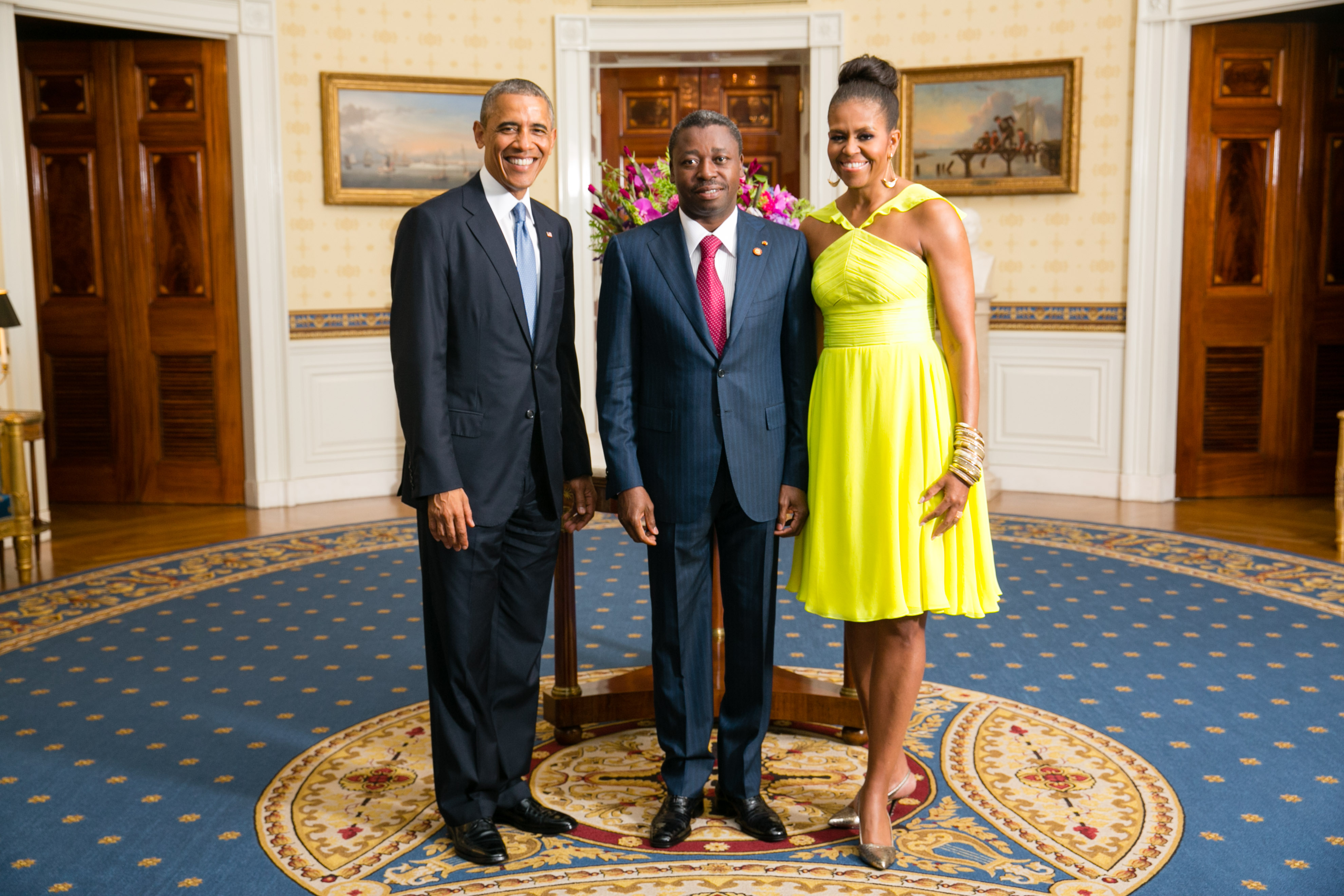

== Tunisia ==
Table of Trips
Start	End	Guest	Title	Reason
May 3, 1961	May 6, 1961	Habib Bourguiba	President	State visit. Addressed Congress May 4. Afterwards visited Knoxville, Dallas, and New York City. Departed U.S. May 13.
May 15, 1968	May 17, 1968	Habib Bourguiba	President	State visit. In U.S. May 12–21; visited Williamsburg (private), Houston, San Antonio, and New York City.
March 31, 1969	March 1, 1969	Habib Bourguiba	President	Attended funeral of former President Eisenhower; met with President Nixon April 1.
May 1, 1975	May 5, 1975	Hedi Amara Nouira	Prime Minister	Official visit. In U.S. April 29 – May 6; visited Williamsburg and Atlanta.
November 28, 1978	December 1, 1978	Hedi Amara Nouira	Prime Minister	Official visit. Afterwards visited Dallas, Phoenix, Fresno, and New York City. Departed U.S. December 5.
April 26, 1982	April 30, 1982	Mohammed Mzali	Prime Minister	Official working visit. In U.S. April 24; visited Princeton. Private visit afterwards to Chicago and New York City.
June 14, 1985	June 25, 1985	Habib Bourguiba	President	Official Working Visit.
November 14, 1989	November 14, 1989	Zine El Abidine Ben Ali	President	Met with President Bush during a private visit.
May 14, 1990	May 17, 1990	Zine El Abidine Ben Ali	President	State Visit.
February 15, 2004	February 21, 2004	Zine El Abidine Ben Ali	President	Working visit.
October 7, 2011	October 7, 2011	Beji Caid Essebsi	Prime Minister	Working visit.
April 3, 2014	April 4, 2014	Mehdi Jomaa	Prime Minister	Working visit.
May 20, 2015	May 21, 2015	Beji Caid Essebsi	President	Official Working Visit.

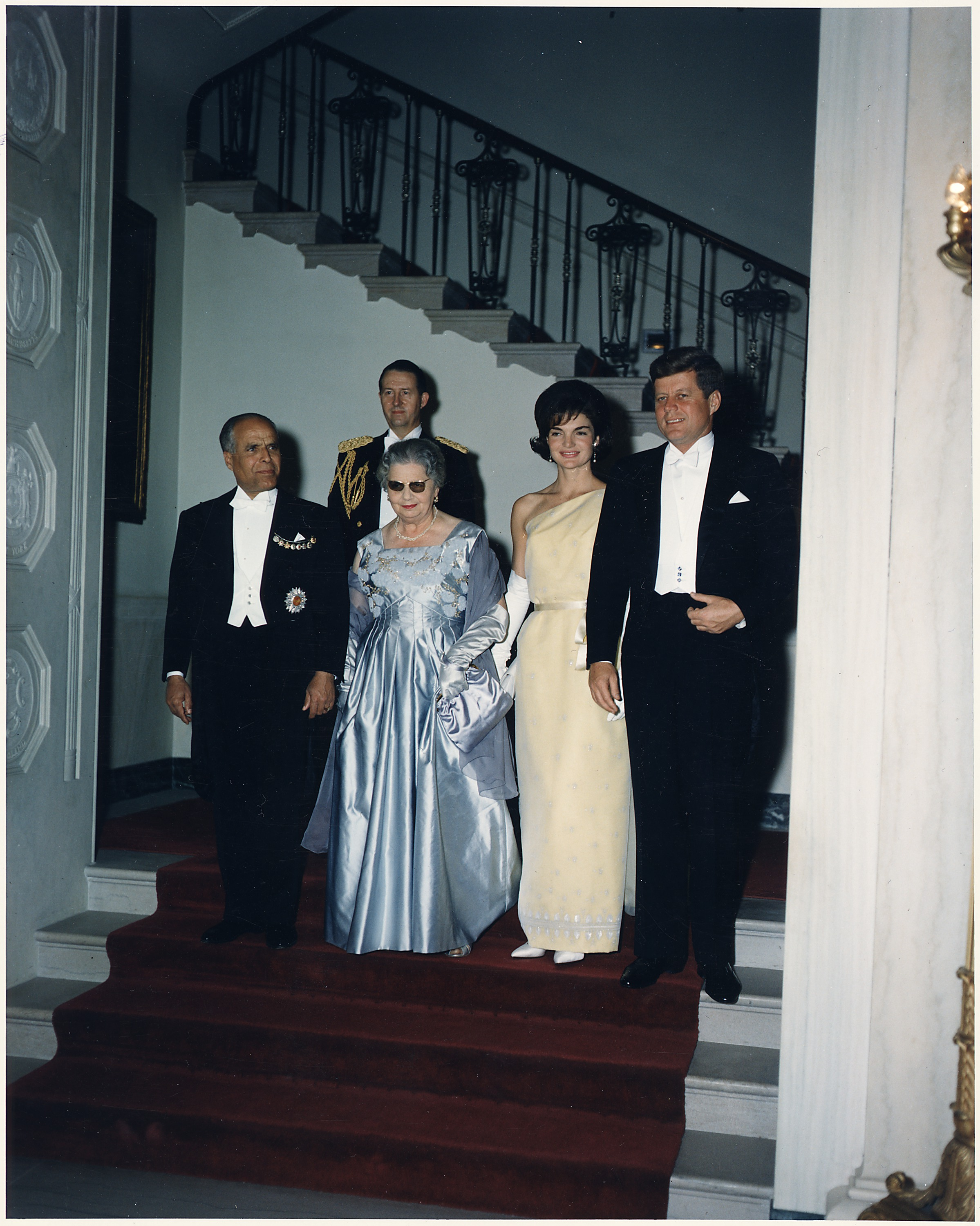

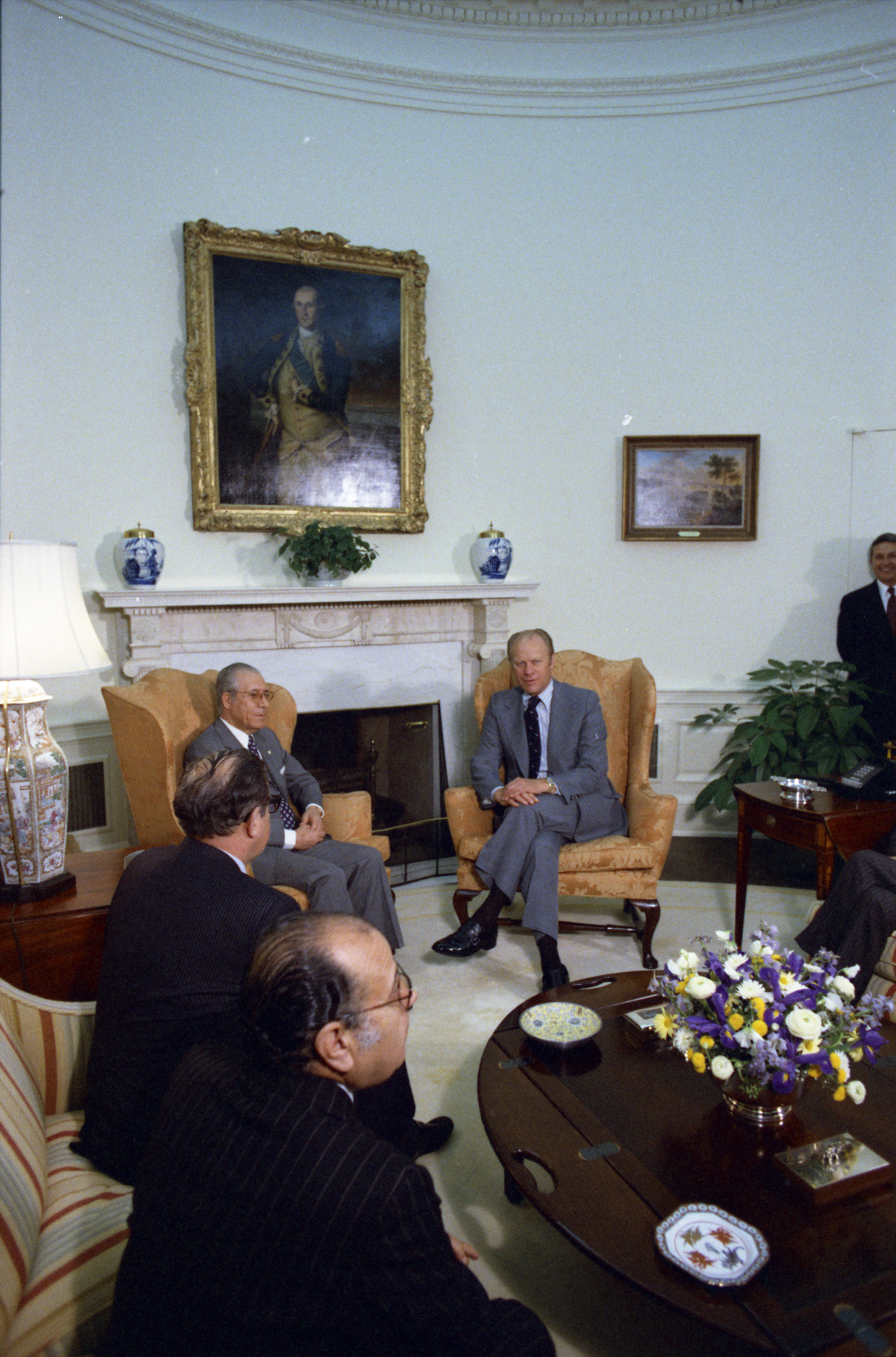

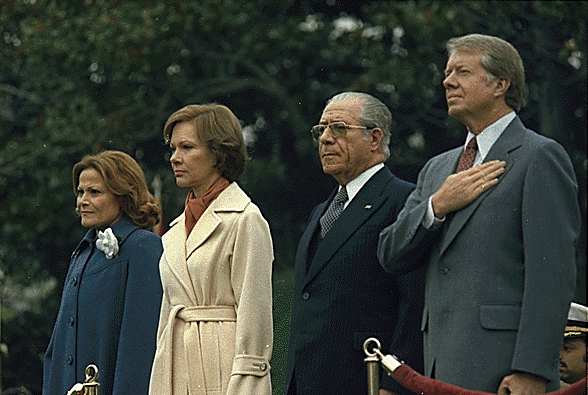

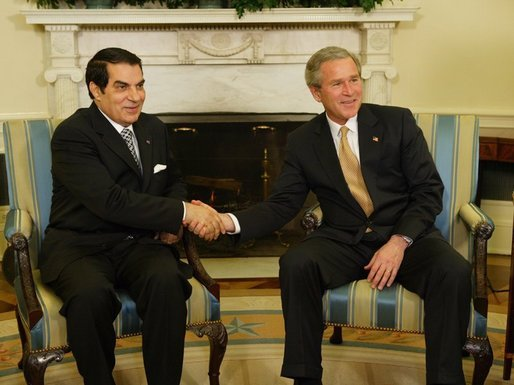

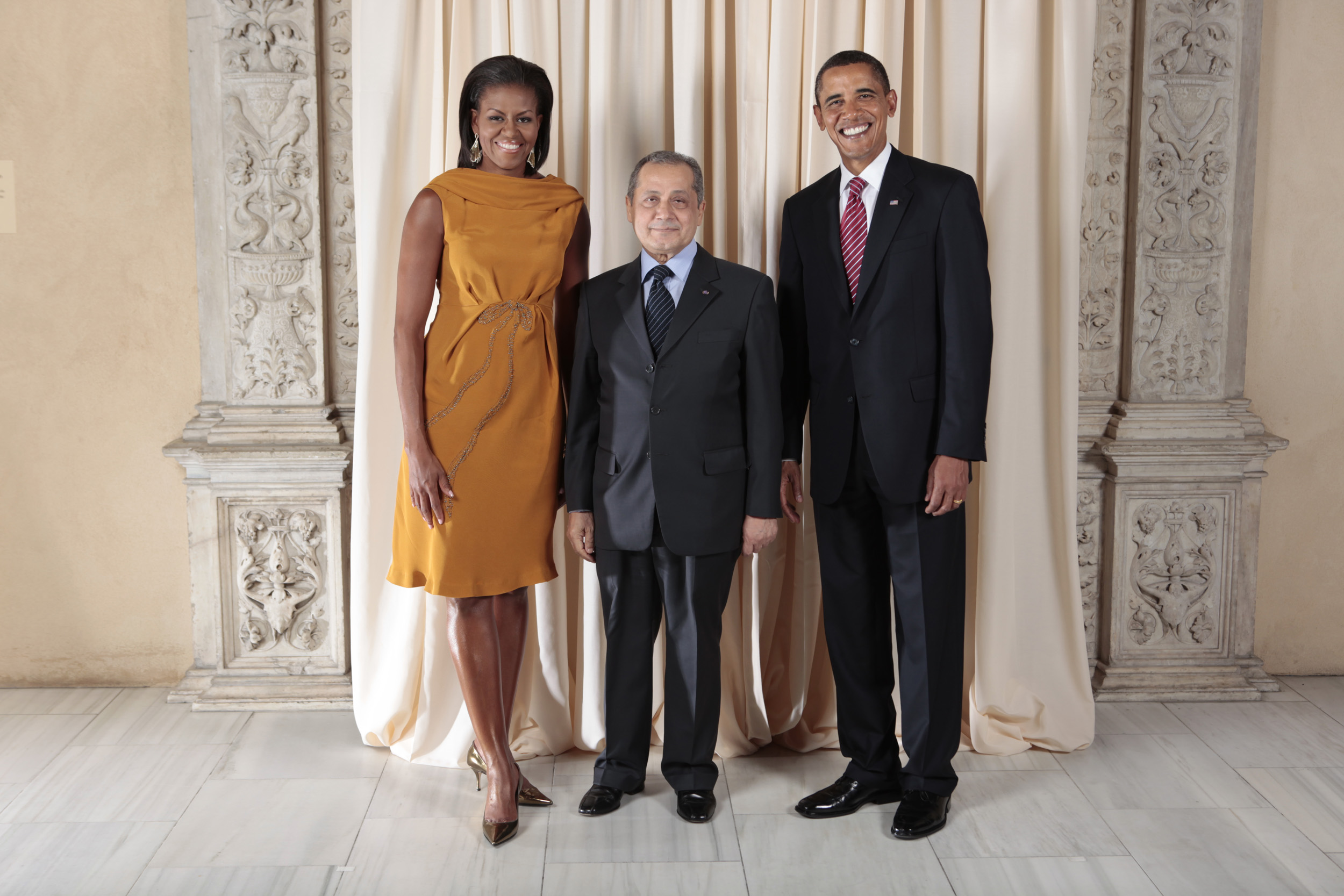

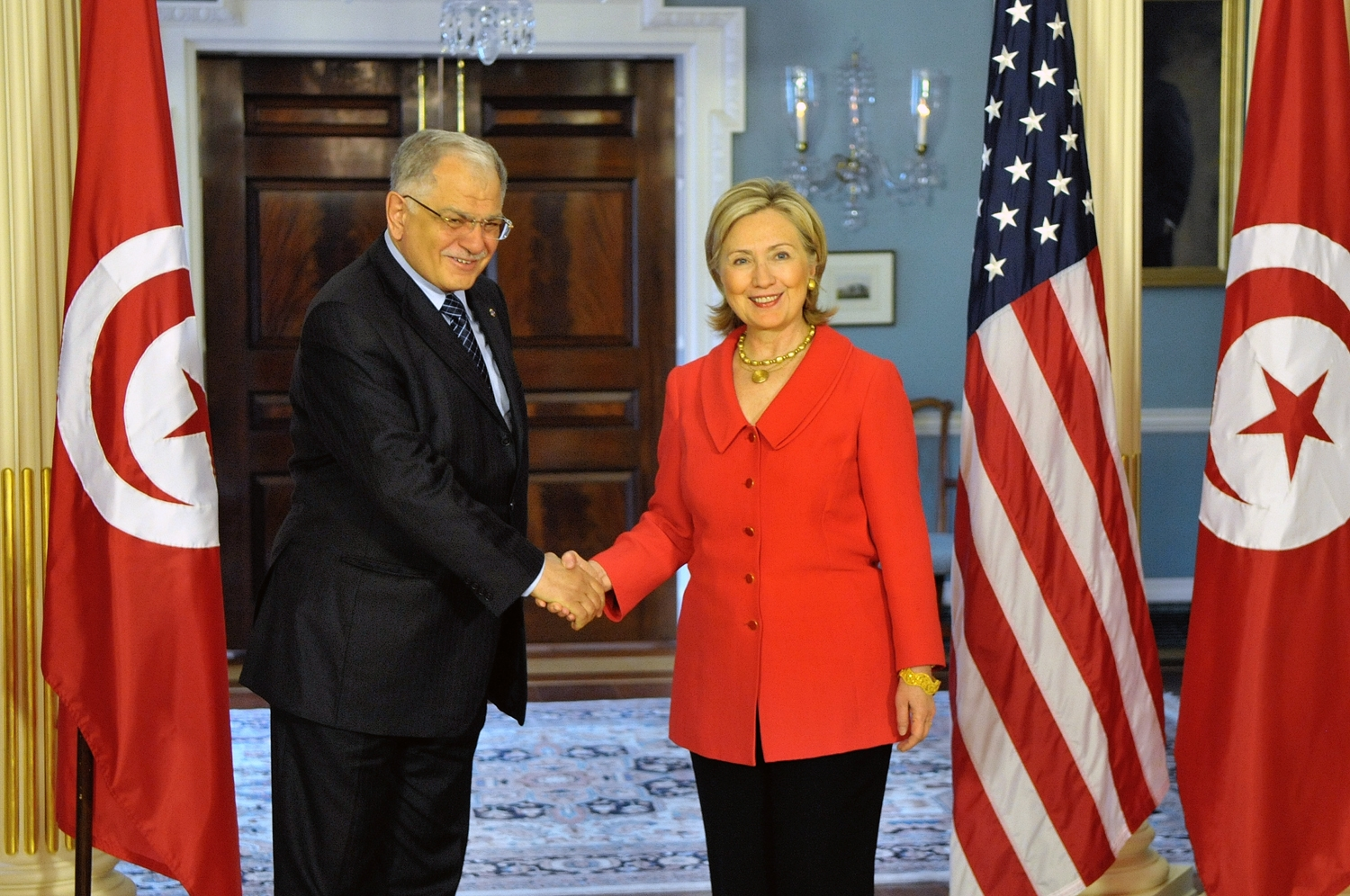

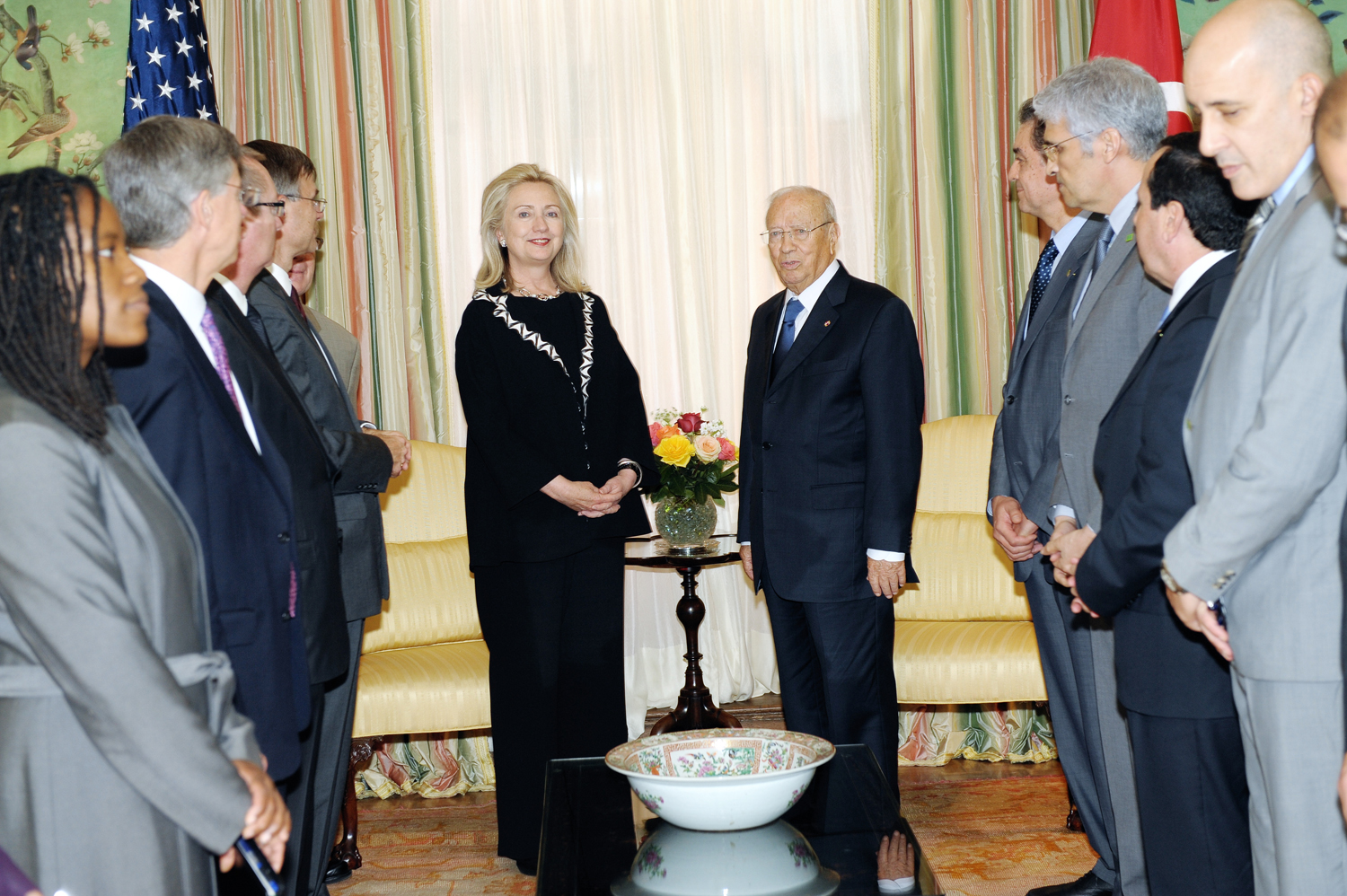

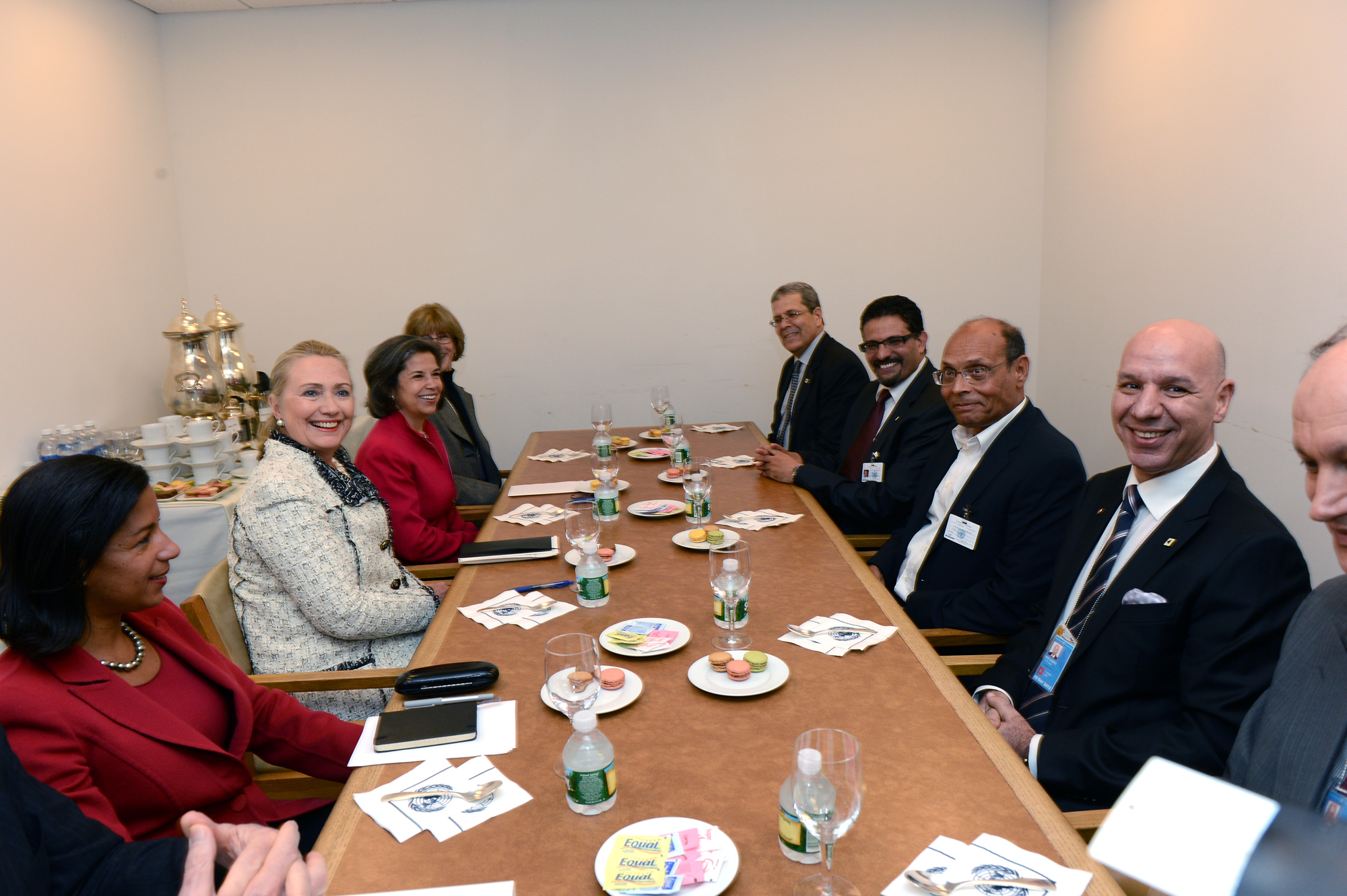

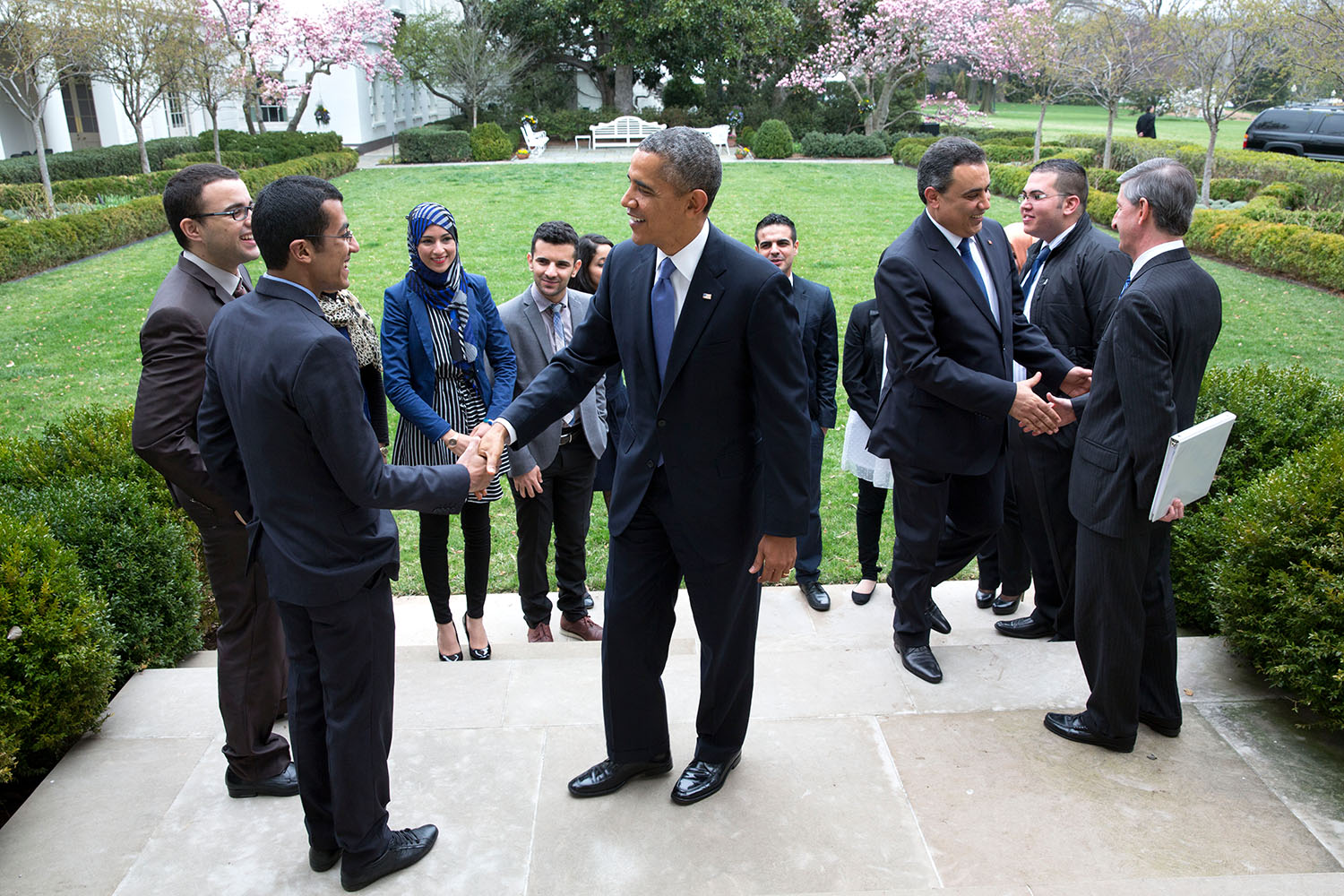

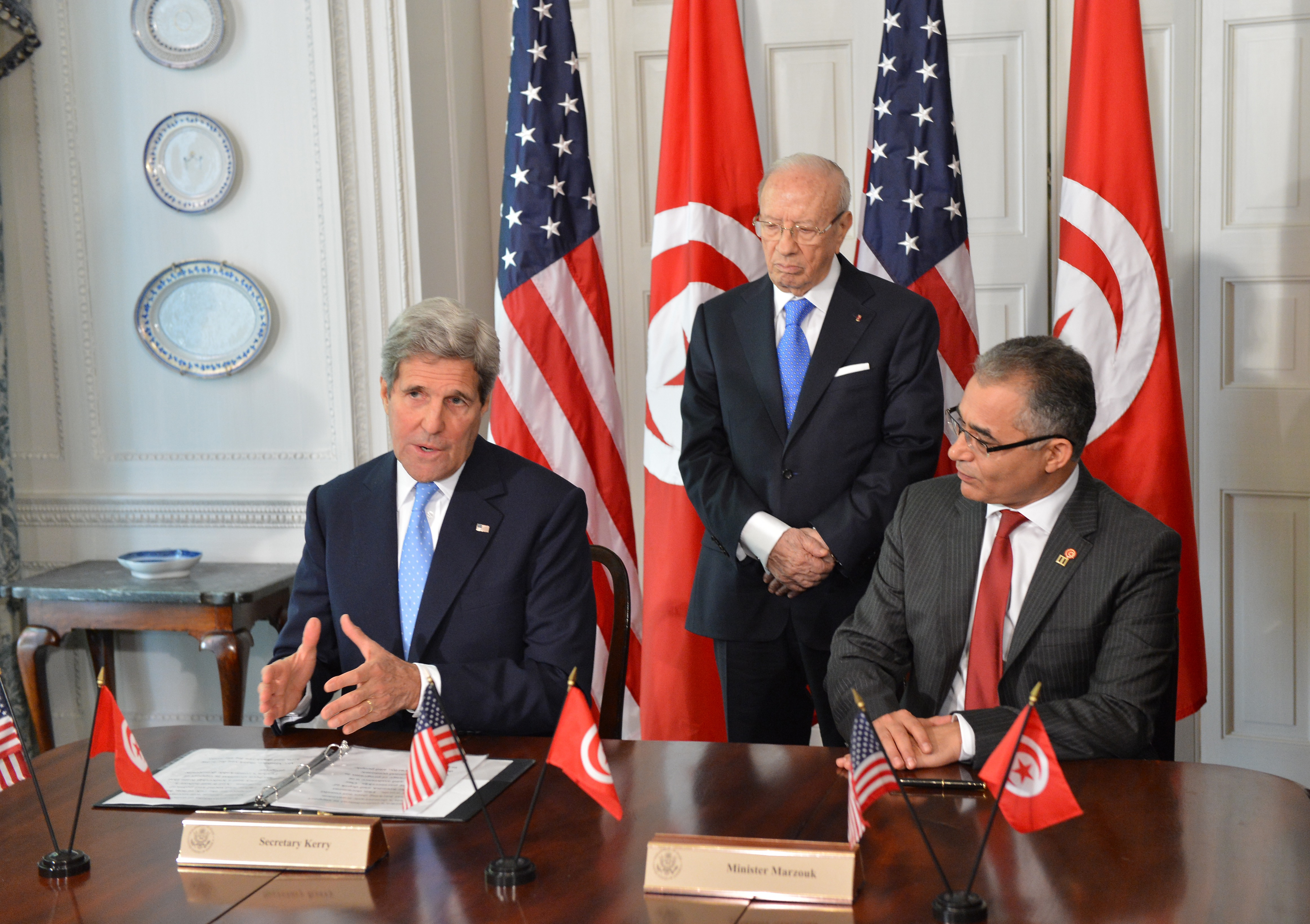

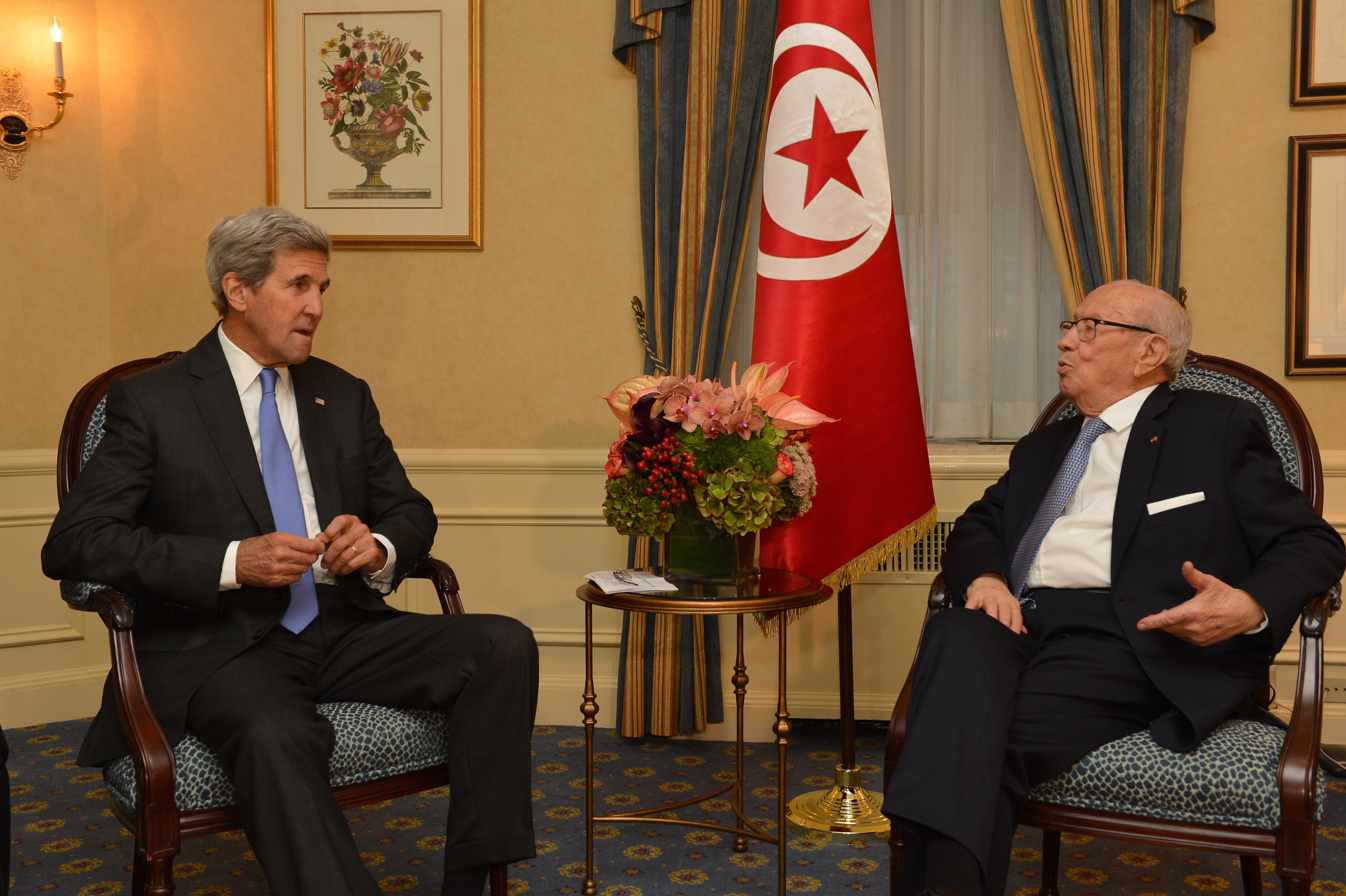

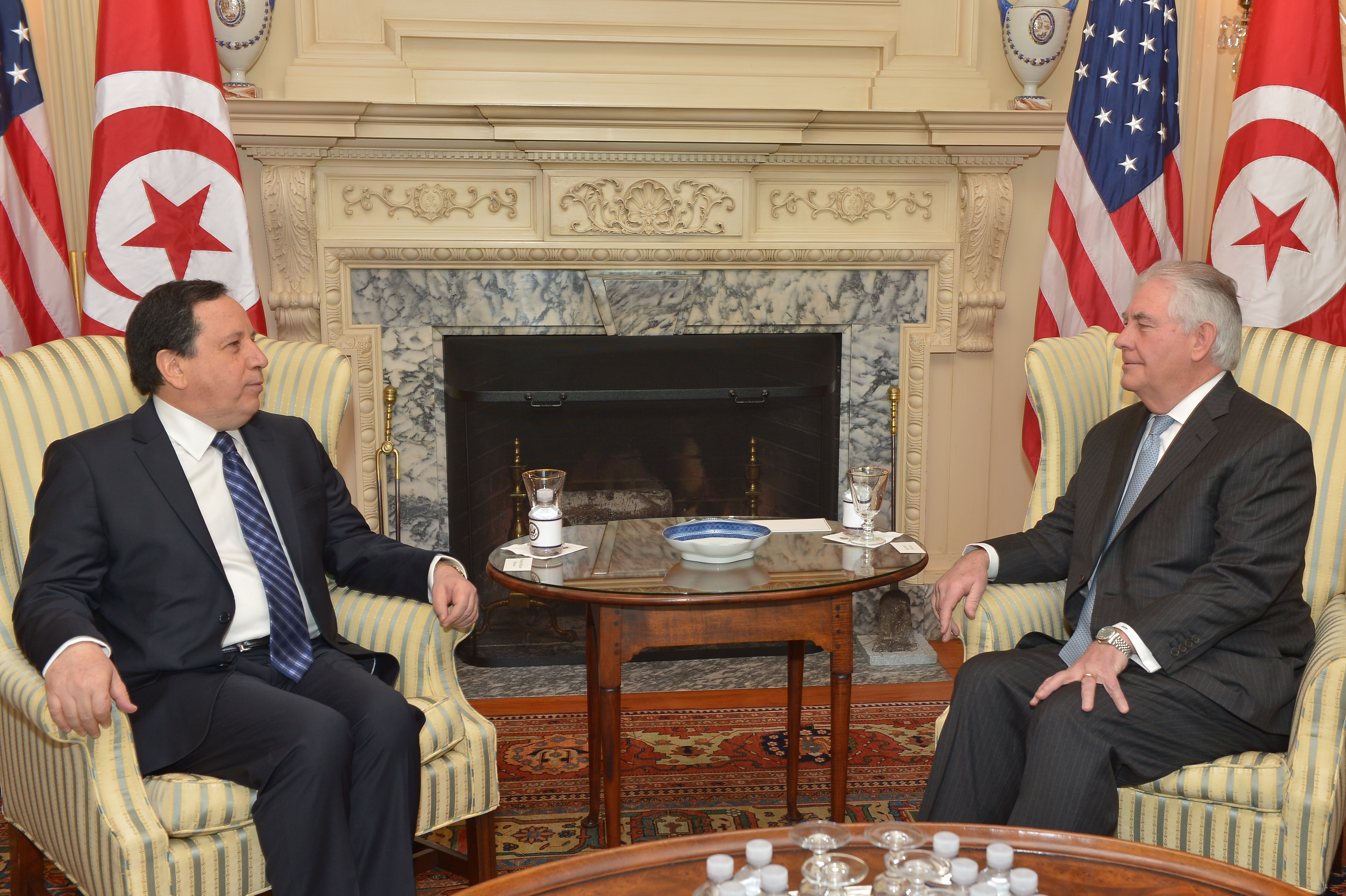

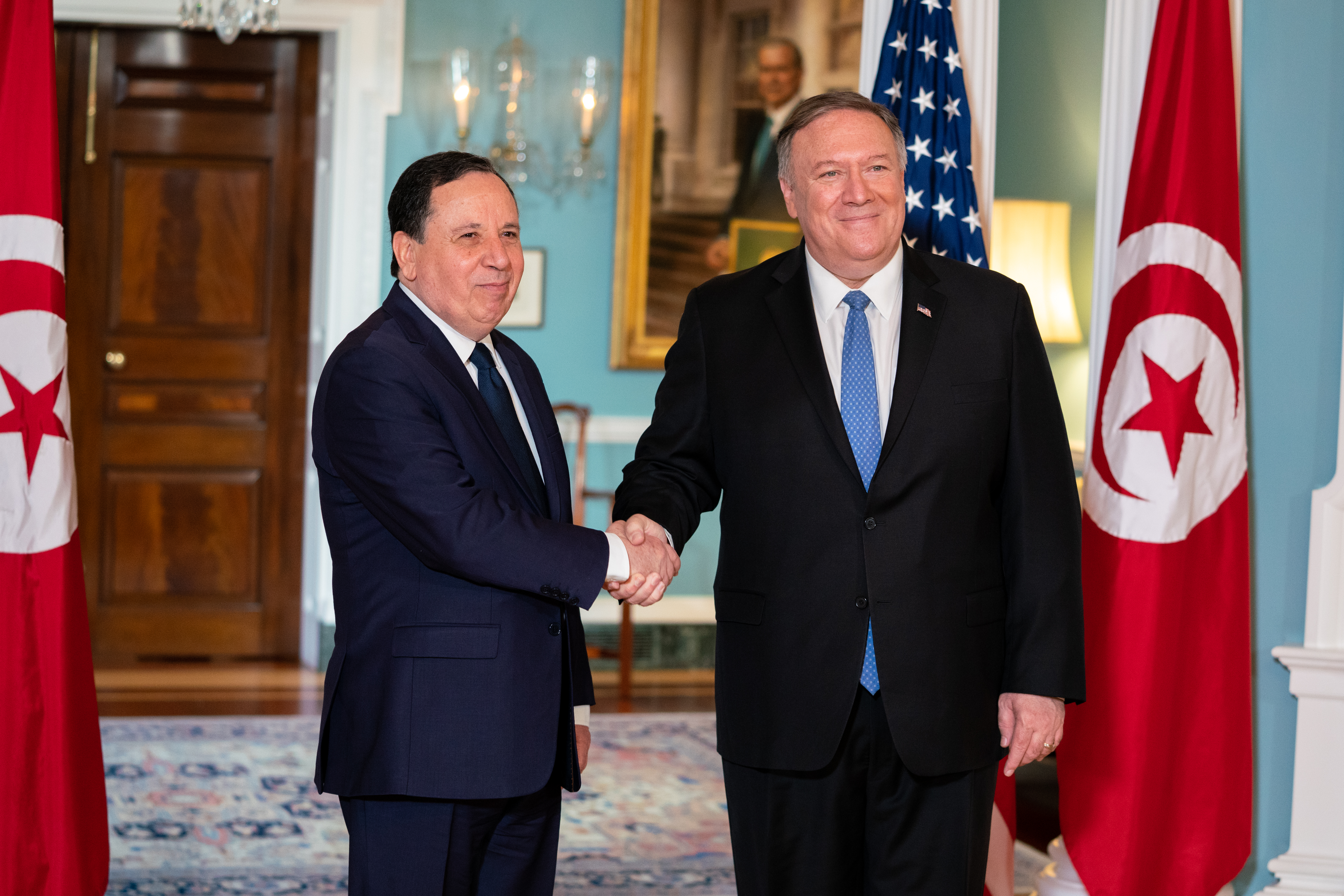

== Uganda ==
Table of Trips
Start	End	Guest	Title	Reason
October 22, 1962	October 23, 1962	Milton Obote	Prime Minister	Presidential guest.
October 19, 1987	October 19, 1987	Yoweri Museveni	President	Met with President Reagan during a private visit.
October 1, 1990	October 1, 1990	Yoweri Museveni	President	Met with President Bush at the U.N. General Assembly.
June 18, 1994	June 22, 1994	Yoweri Museveni	President	Met with President Clinton during a private visit.
May 5, 2002	May 7, 2002	Yoweri Museveni	President	Working visit.
June 9, 2003	June 14, 2003	Yoweri Museveni	President	Working visit.
June 23, 2003	June 27, 2003	Apollo Nsibambi	Prime Minister	Attended United States-Africa Business Summit; met with President Bush during a private visit June 26.
June 9, 2004	June 10, 2004	Yoweri Museveni	President	Met with President Bush at the G-8 Economic Summit at Sea Island.
October 29, 2007	October 31, 2007	Yoweri Museveni	President	Working visit.
September 23, 2008	September 23, 2008	Yoweri Museveni	President	Met with President Bush at the UN General Assembly in New York City.

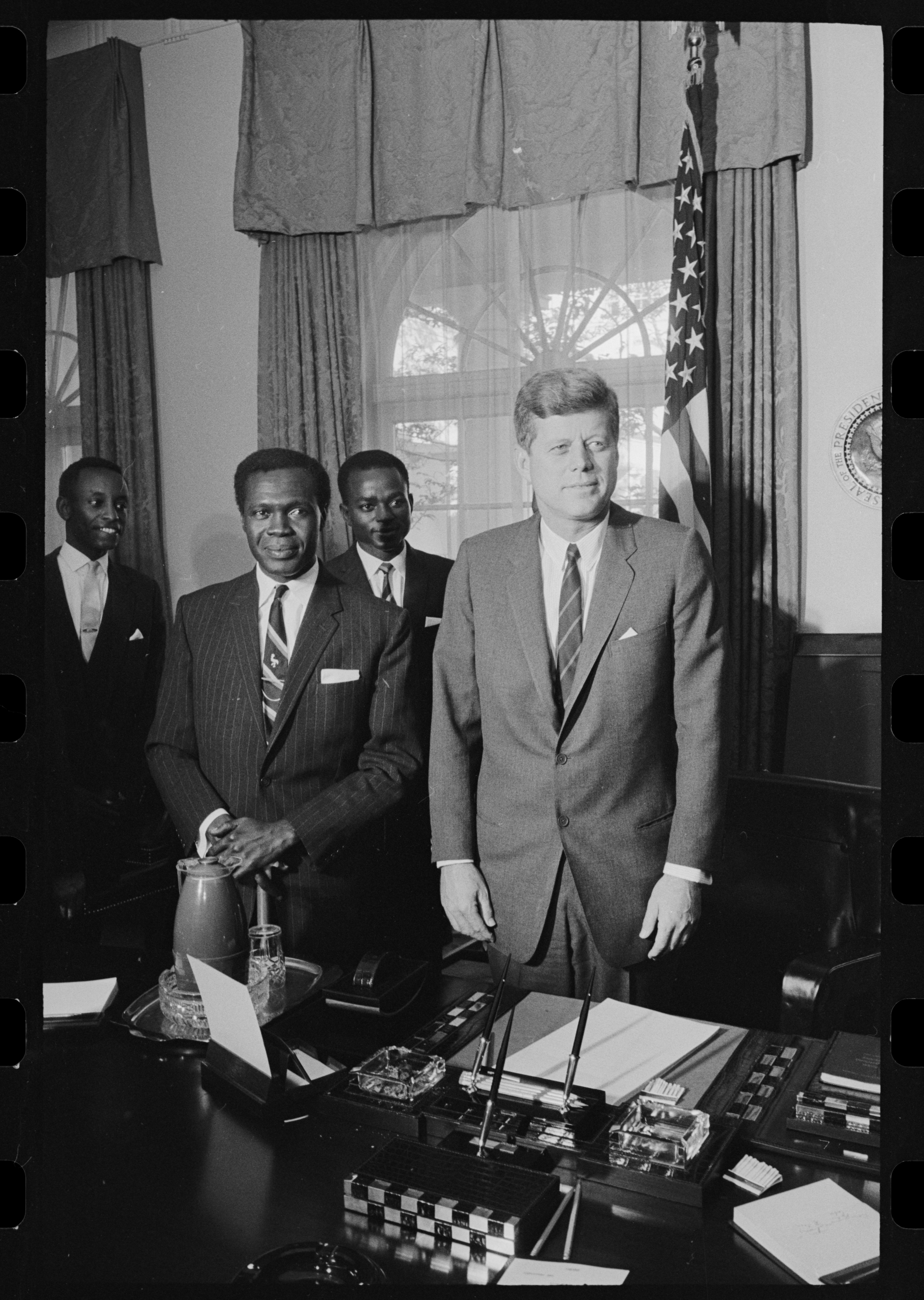

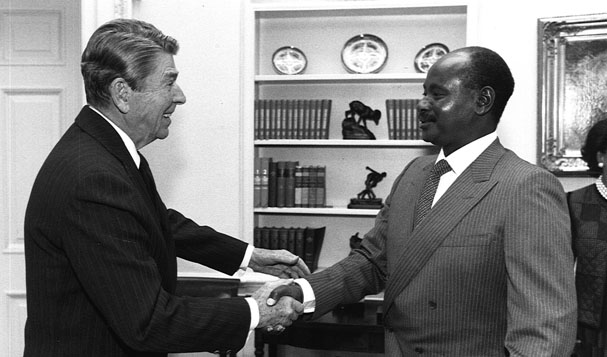

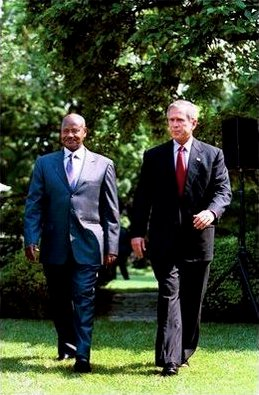

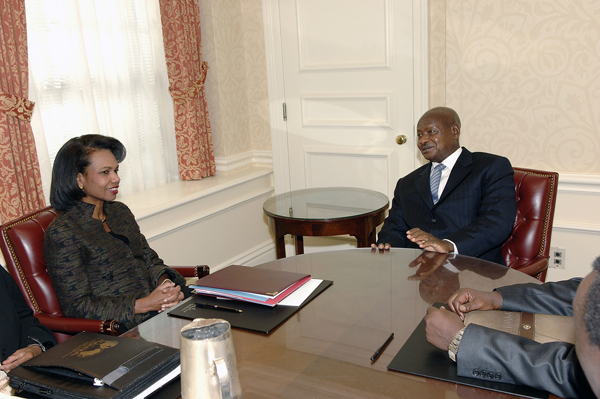

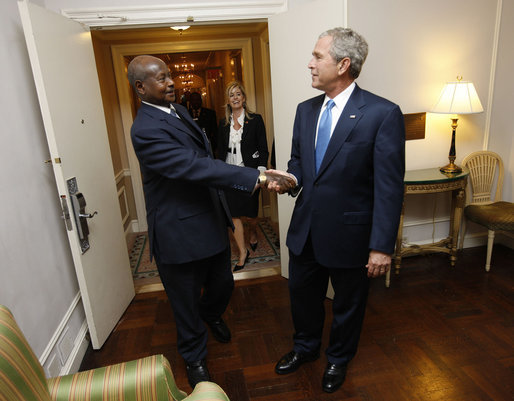

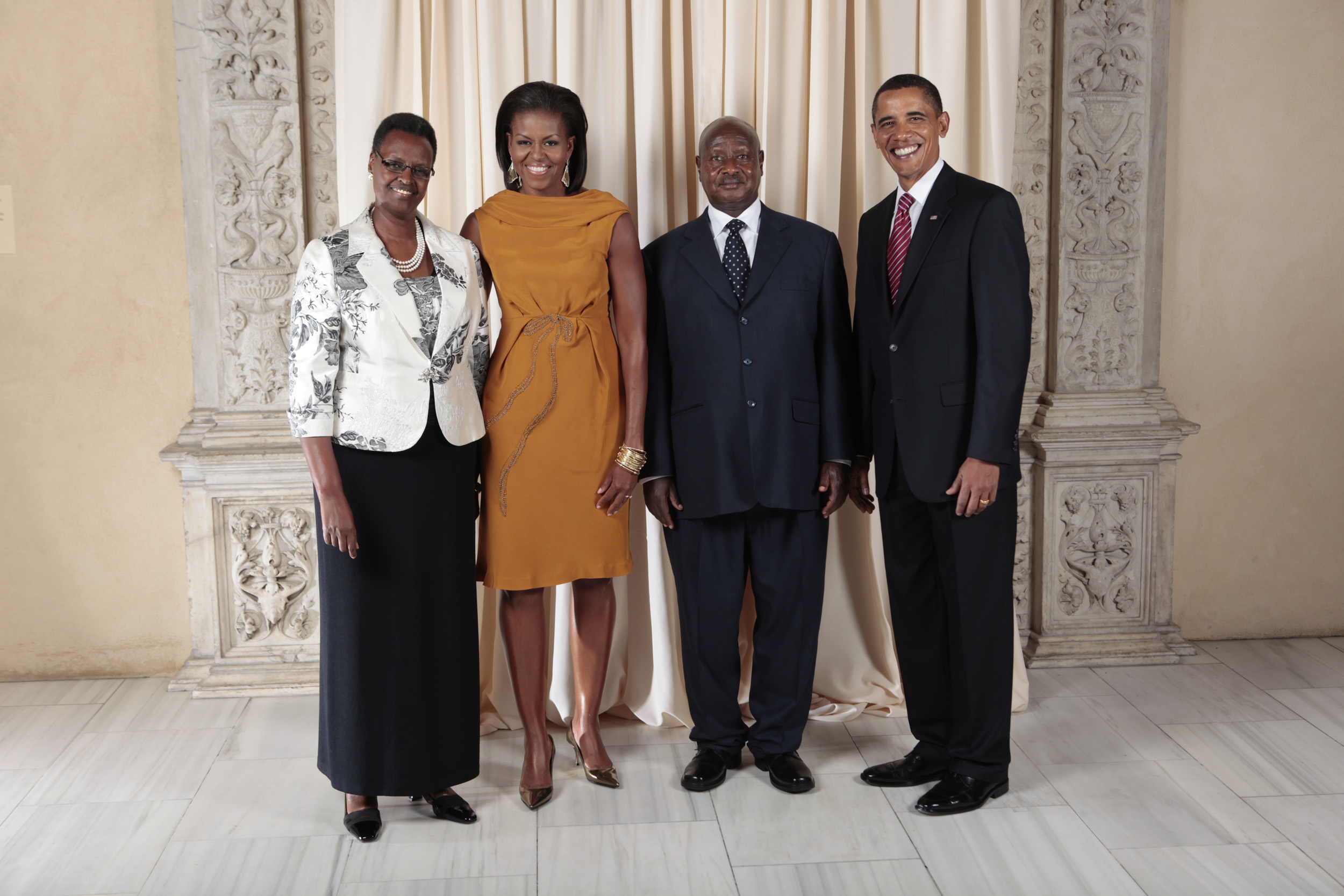

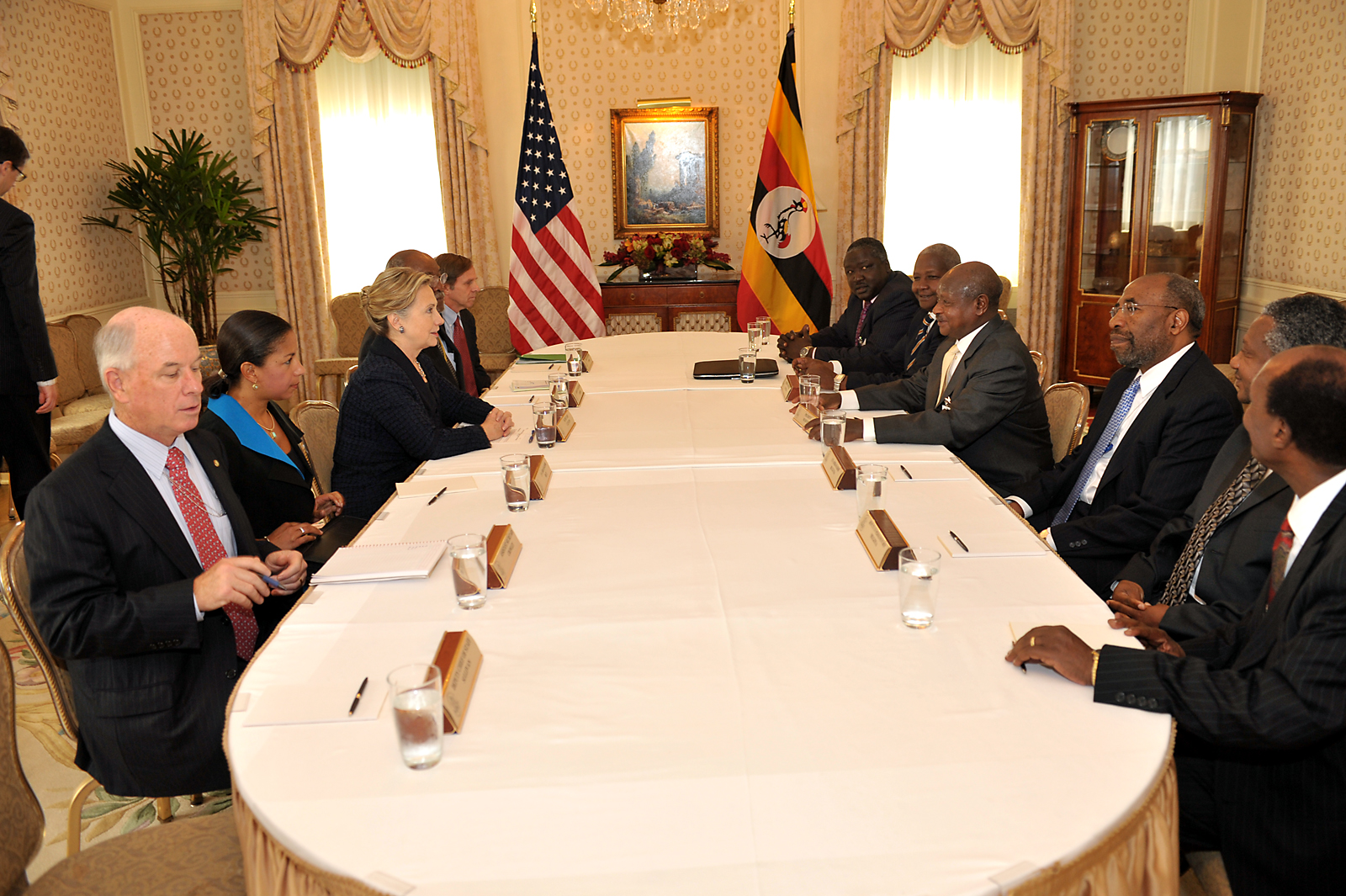

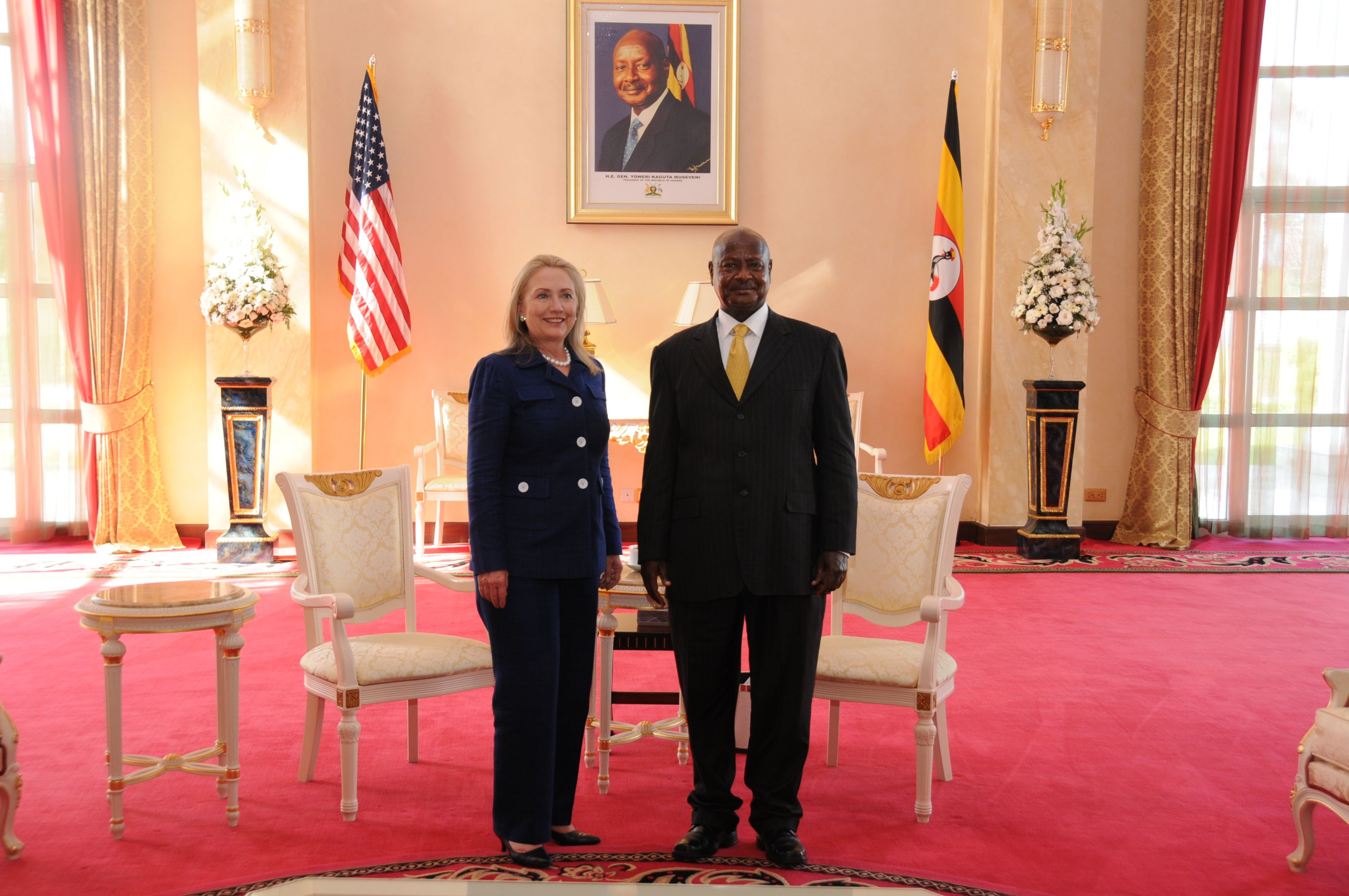

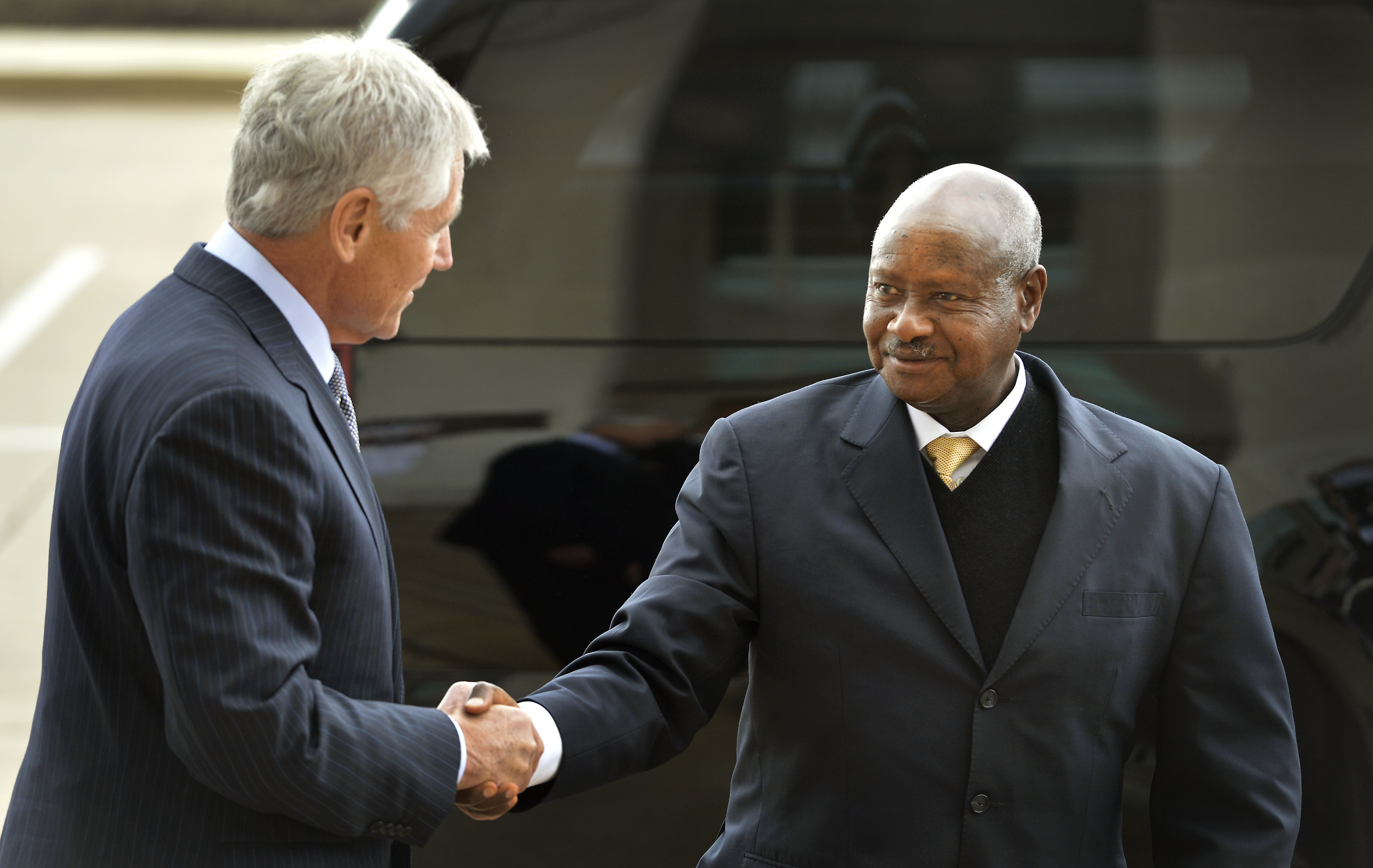

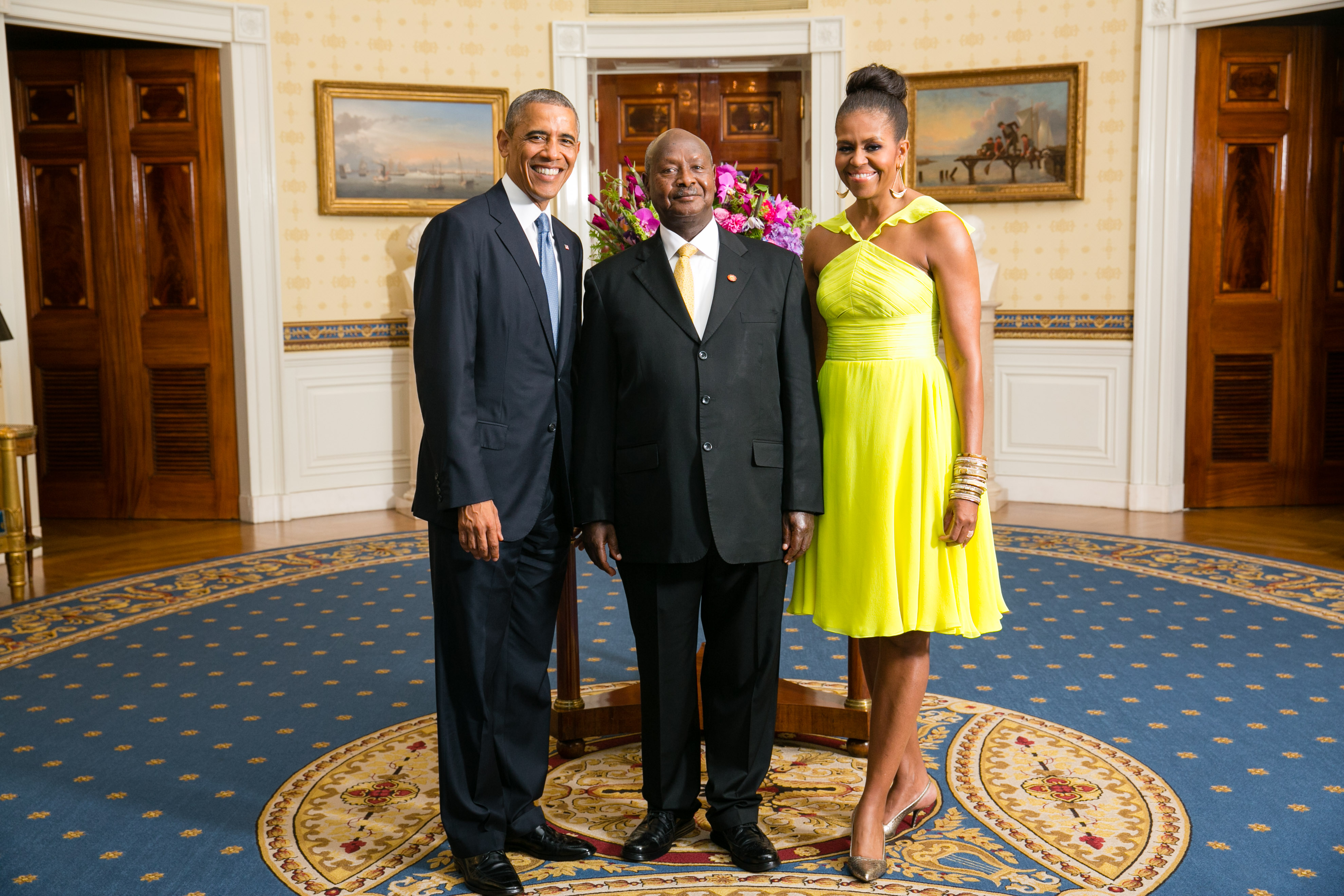

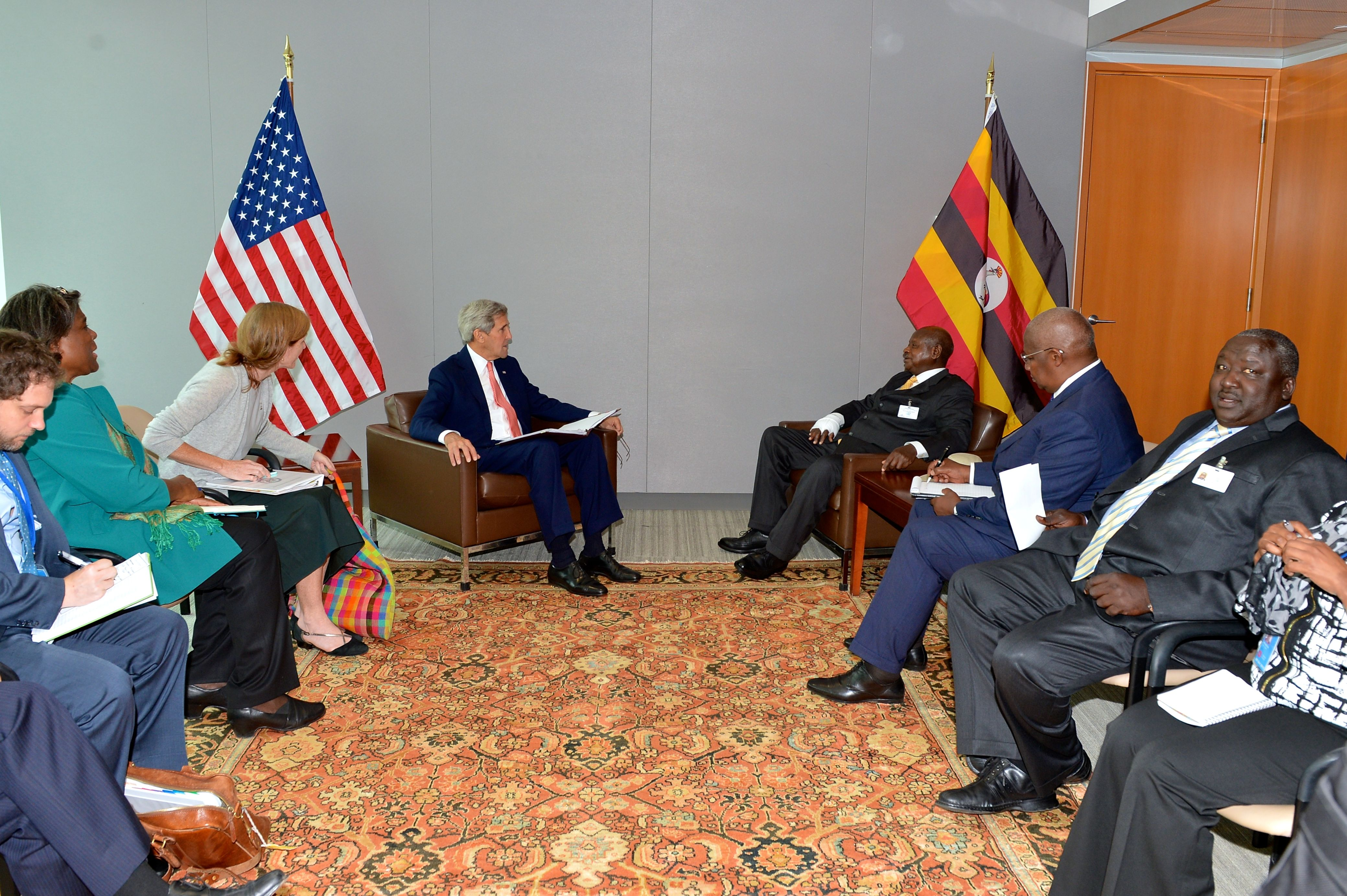

== Zambia ==
Table of Trips
Start	End	Guest	Title	Reason
18.-21.Apr.1975	18.-21.Apr.1975	Kenneth Kaunda	President	Private visit.Met with President Ford April 19.
17.5.-19.Apr.1978	17.5.-19.Apr.1978	Kenneth Kaunda	President	State visit.In U.S.May 16–23; visited Williamsburg, Atlanta, Houston, and Los Angeles.Private visit to New York City, May 21–23.
29.3.-2.Apr.1983	29.3.-2.Apr.1983	Kenneth Kaunda	President	Official working visit.
7.-11.Oct.1987	7.-11.Oct.1987	Kenneth Kaunda	President	Official working visit.
June 7, 1989	June 7, 1989	Kenneth Kaunda	President	Met with President Bush during a private visit.
February 19, 1992	February 19, 1992	Frederick Chiluba	President	Met with President Bush during a private visit.

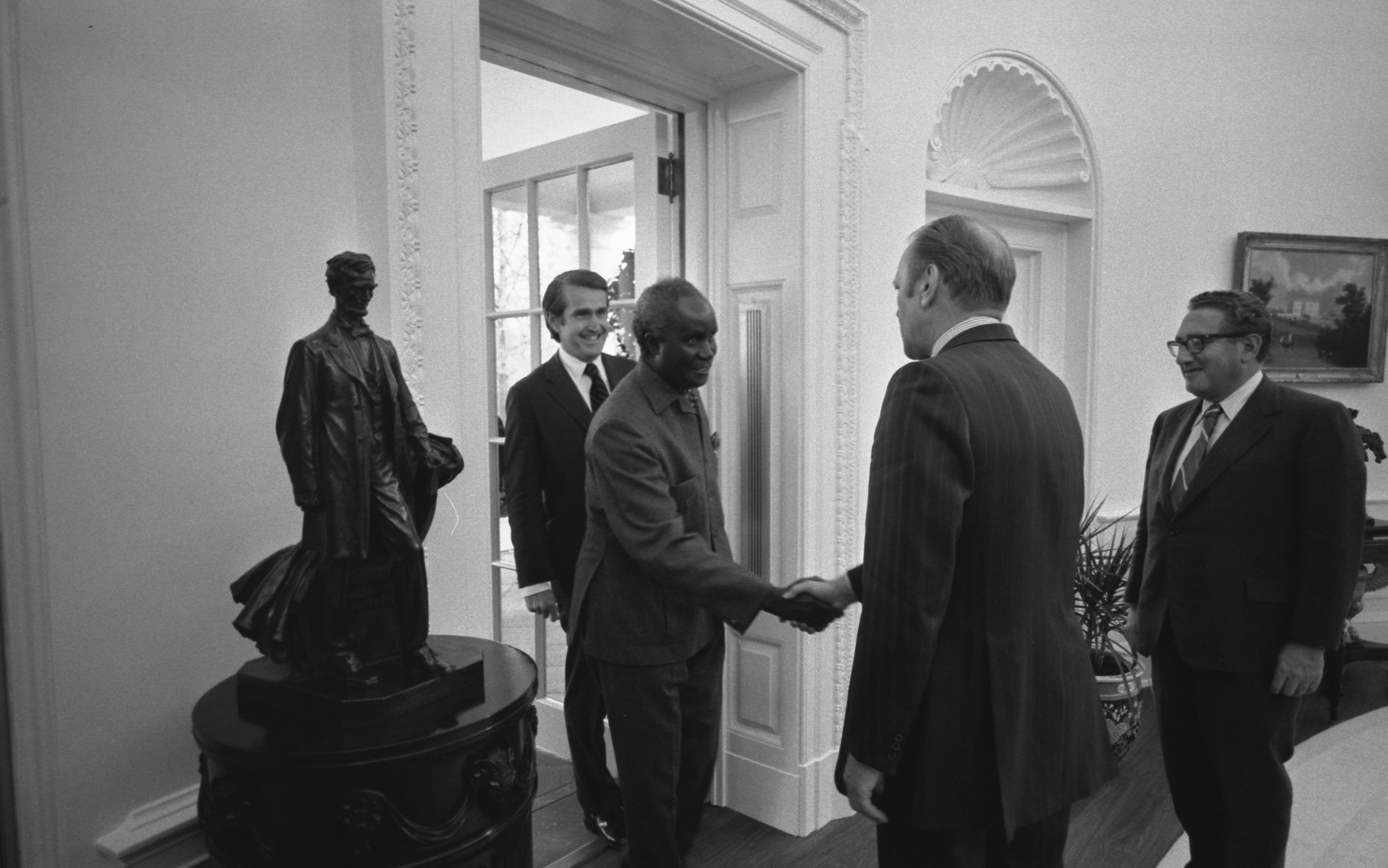

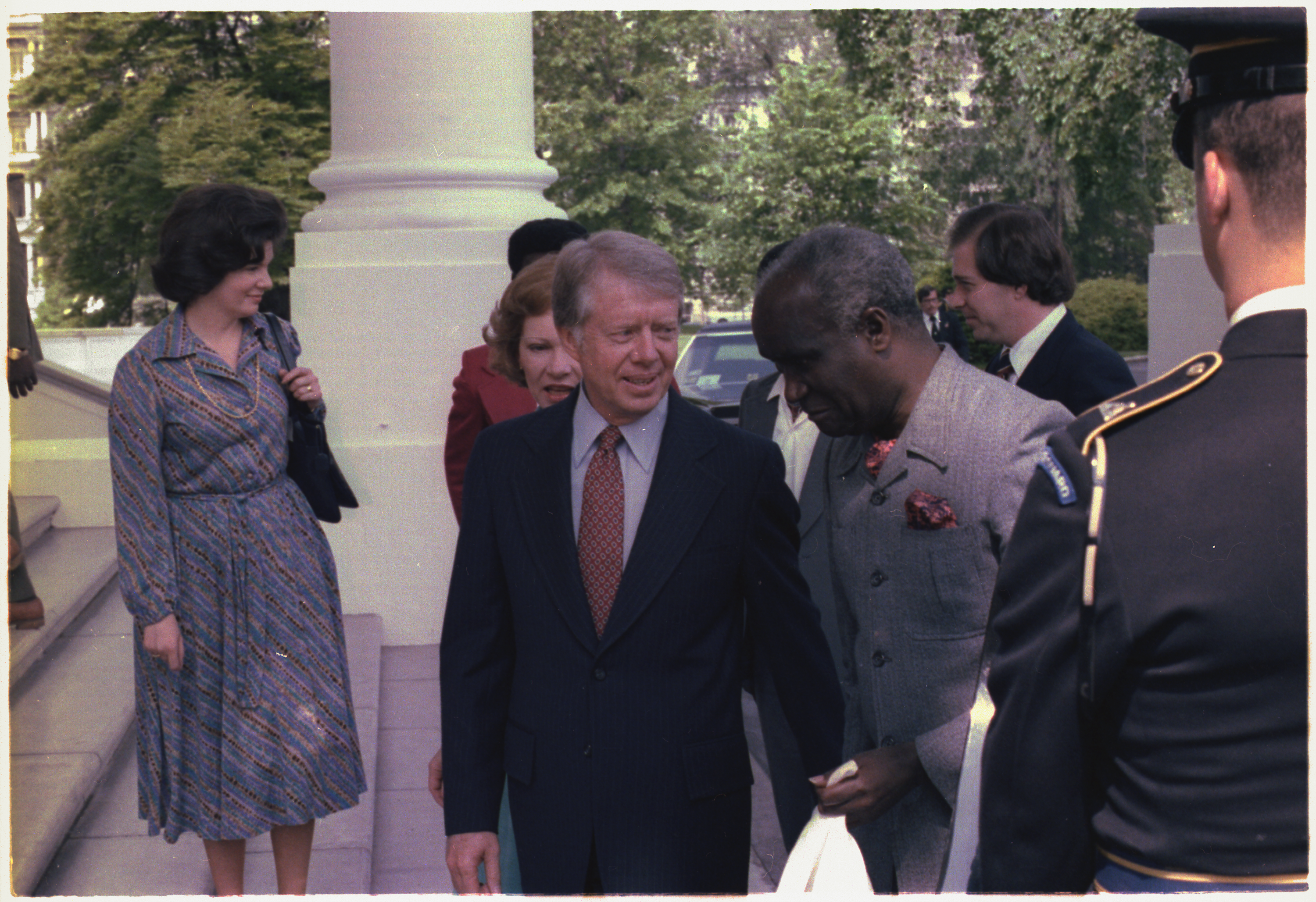

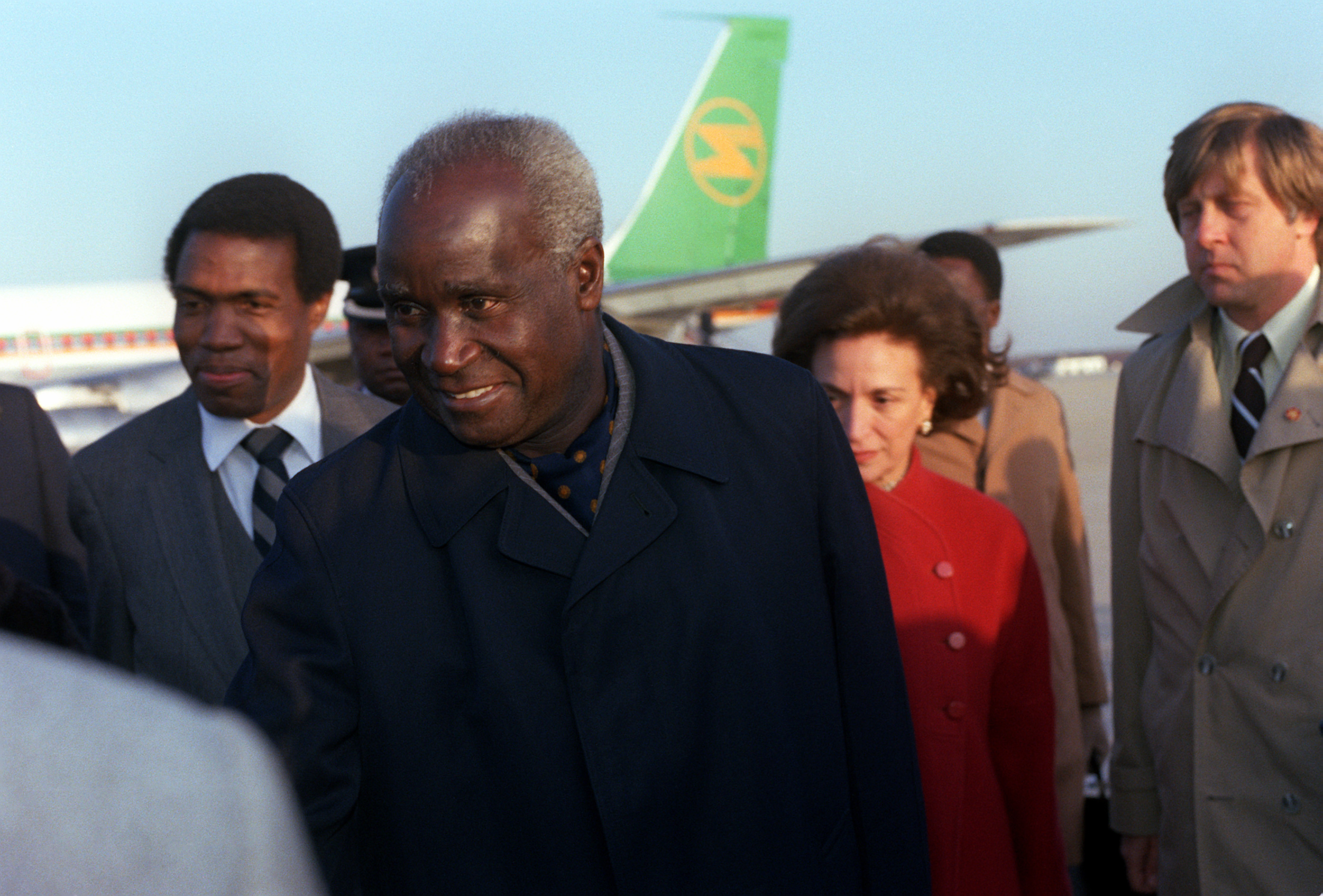

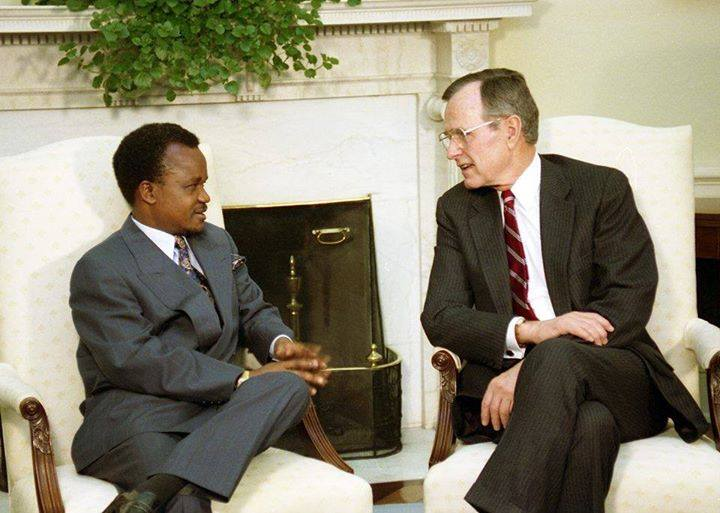

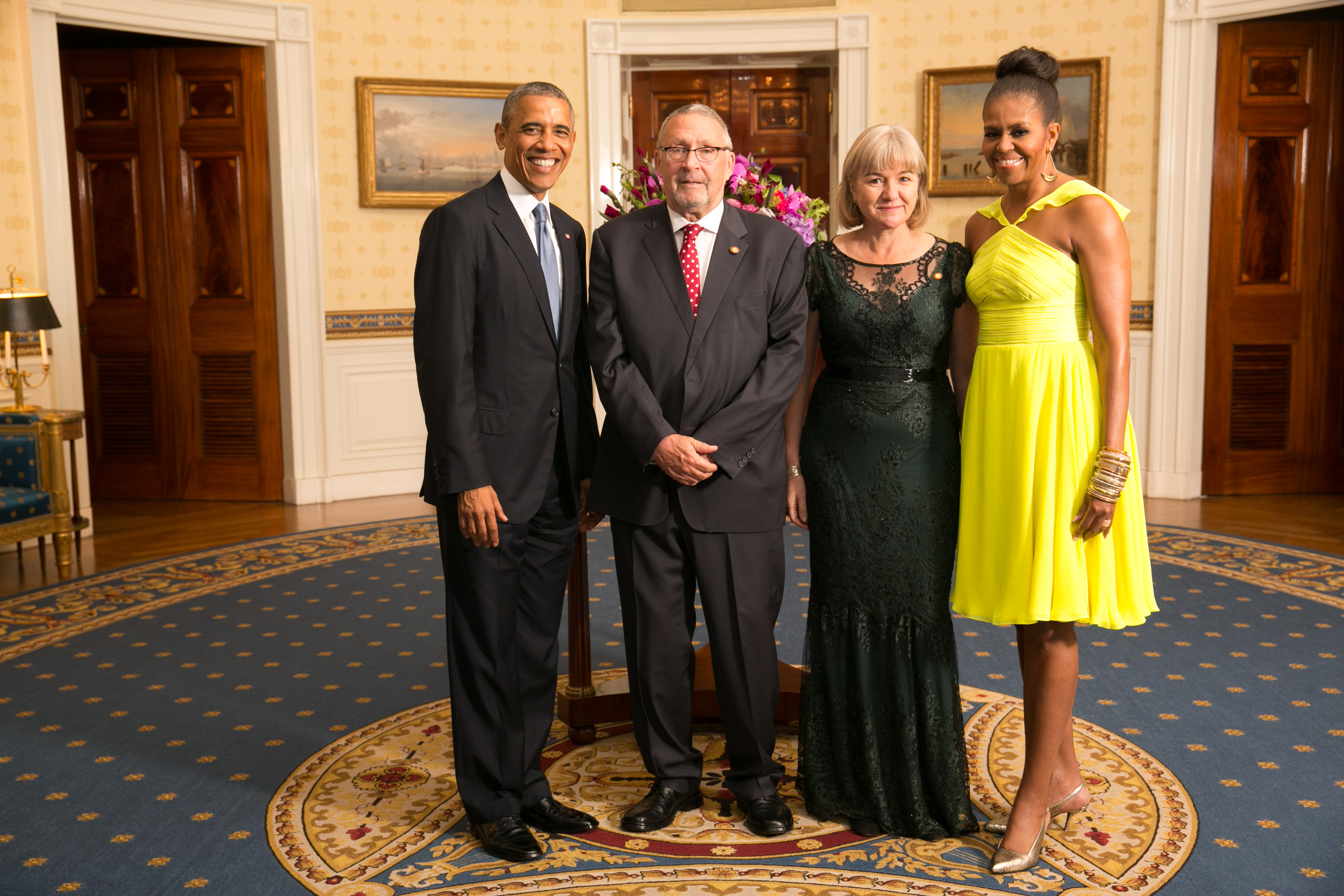

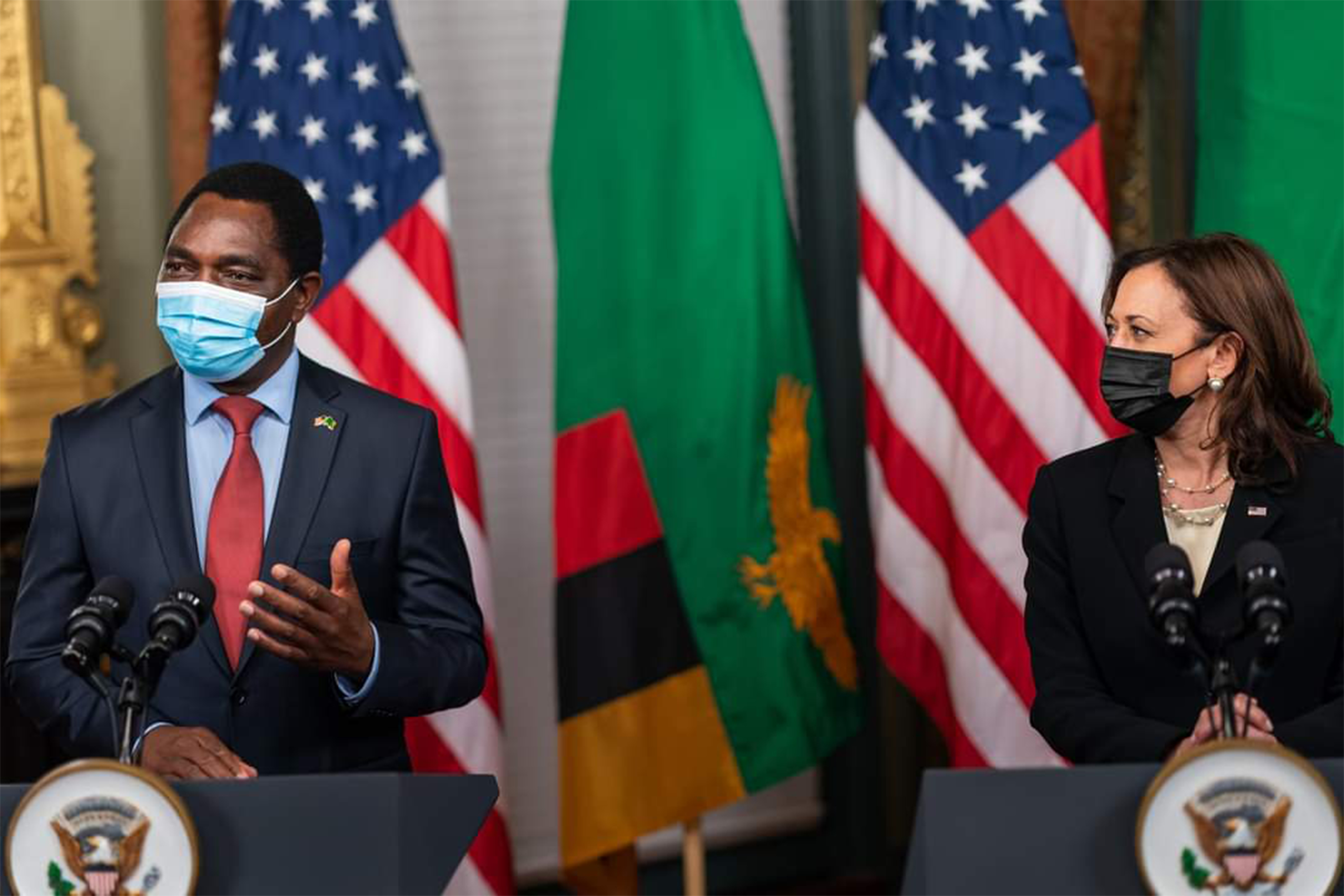

== Zimbabwe ==
Table of Trips
Start	End	Guest	Title	Reason
July 9, 1979	July 11, 1979	Abel Muzorewa	Prime Minister	Unofficial visit.Met with President Carter July 11.
August 21, 1980	August 27, 1980	Robert Mugabe	Prime Minister	Official visit.
September 12, 1983	September 14, 1983	Robert Mugabe	Prime Minister	Official working visit.Private visit to Detroit afterward.
July 23, 1991	July 25, 1991	Robert Mugabe	President	Official working visit.
May 17, 1995	May 19, 1995	Robert Mugabe	President	Official working visit.
June 12, 2009	June 12, 2009	Morgan Tsvangirai	Prime Minister	Working Visit.

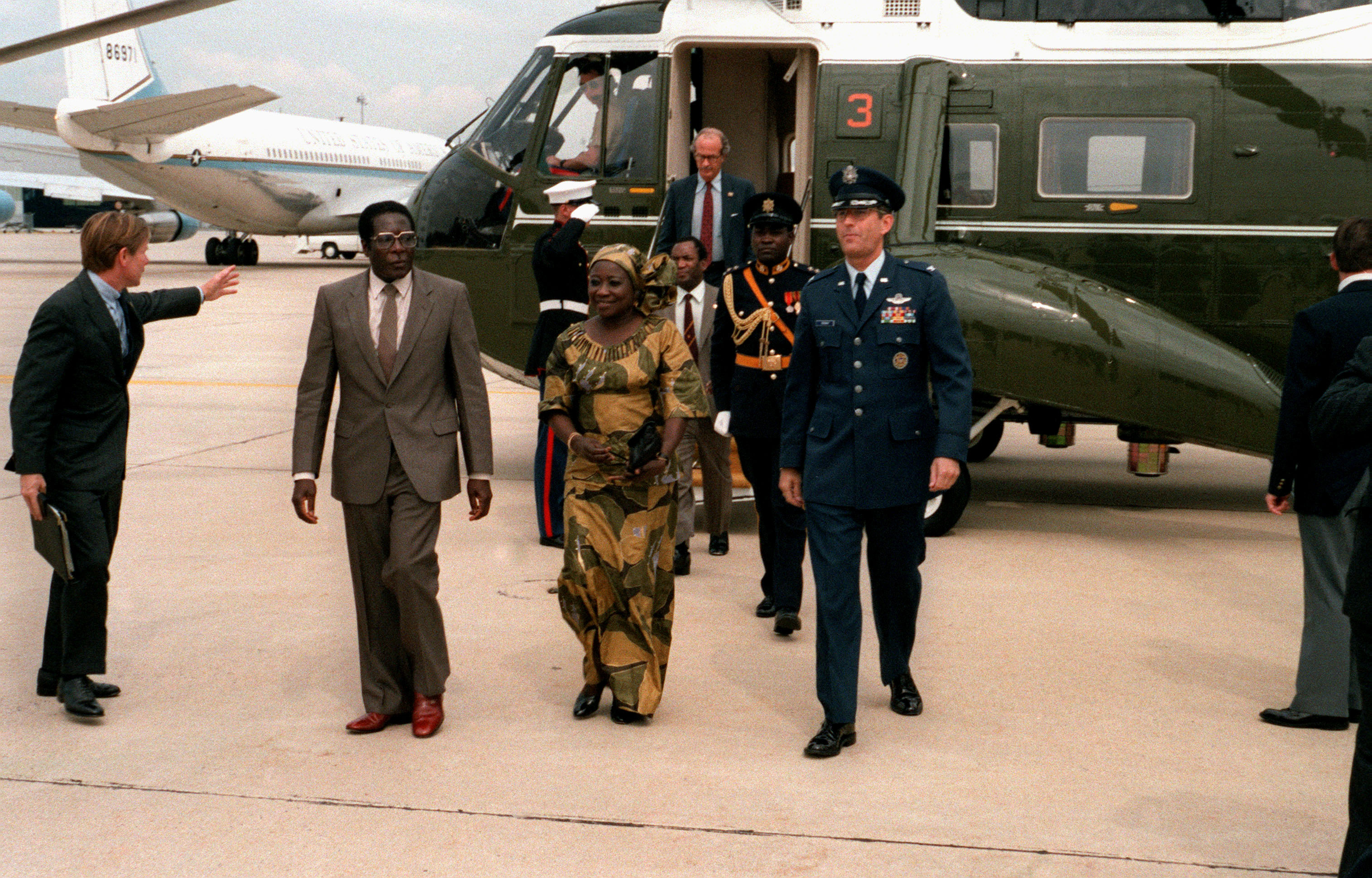

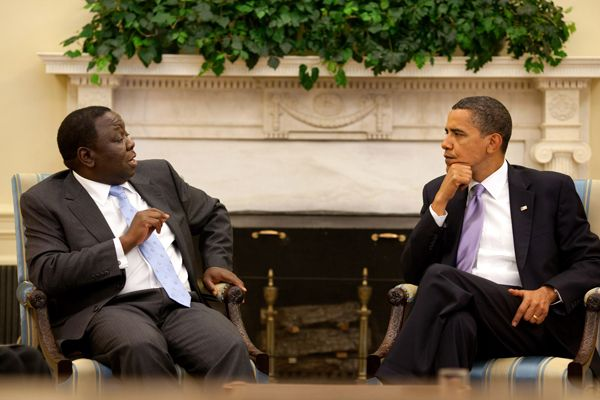

== See also ==
- Foreign policy of the United States
- Foreign relations of the United States
- List of international trips made by presidents of the United States
- List of diplomatic visits to the United States
- State visit
